= Simunye (disambiguation) =

Simunye is a town in Eswatini. Simunye may also refer to:

- Zulu for "We are one".
- Simunye is a short story by Piper Dellums which was made into the movie The Color of Friendship
