= 2006 Oakland mayoral election =

Oakland mayoral election, 2006
- June 7, 2006
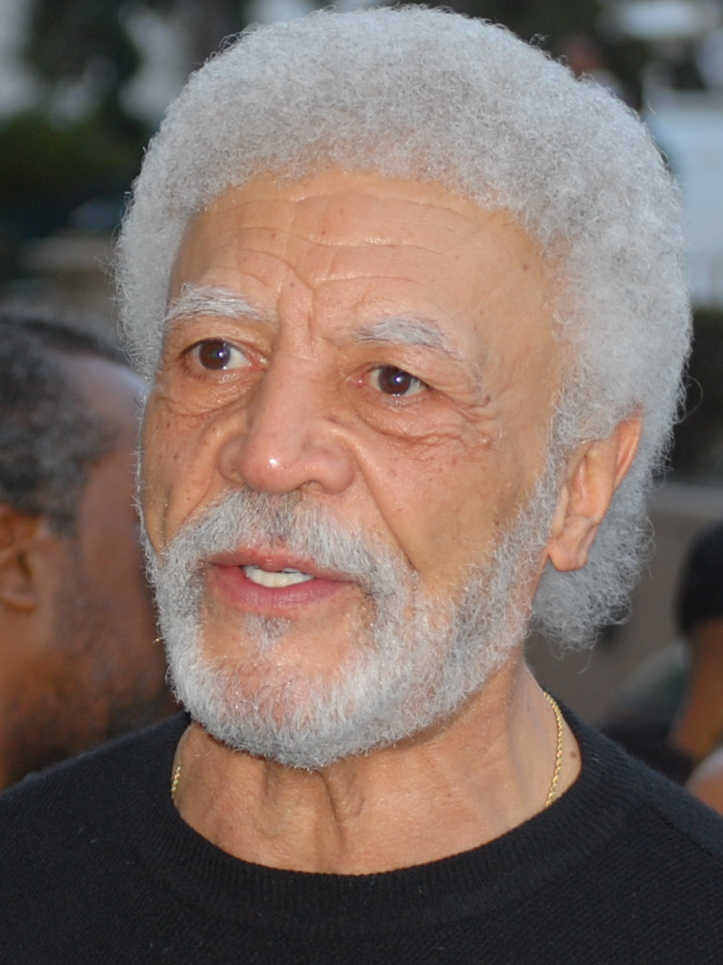

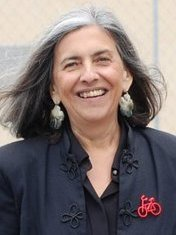
Candidate	Ron Dellums	Ignacio De La Fuente	Nancy Nadel
Party	Democratic	Democratic	Democratic
Popular vote	42,073	27,647	10,949
Percentage	50.2%	33.0%	13.1%
Mayor before election
Jerry Brown
Democratic
Elected mayor
Ron Dellums
Democratic

The 2006 Oakland mayoral election was held on June 7, 2006 to elect the mayor of Oakland, California. It saw the election of Ron Dellums.

Incumbent mayor Jerry Brown did not seek reelection to a third term, instead opting to run in the 2006 California Attorney General election.

A 50% margin of the vote needed to be obtained by the victor in order to avoid a runoff being held in November. Dellums surpassed this margin by a mere 115 votes, thus no runoff was necessitated.

== Candidates ==
- Ignacio De La Fuente, President of the Oakland City Council, member of the Berkeley City Council since 1992, candidate for mayor in 1998
- Ron Dellums, former U.S. congressman (1971–1998), former member of the Berkeley City Council (1967–1971)
- Arnie Fields, affordable housing provider, member of the board of directors for the Music & Art Department of the Arcadia Skate Hotel
- Nancy Nadel, member of the Oakland City Council
- Ron "Oz" Oznowicz, investor and business manager, former Oakland Police Officer (1965–1976)
- Hector "Reno" Reyna, retired financial consultant, perennial candidate

== Results ==
Results
Candidate	Votes	%
Ronald V. "Ron" Dellums	42,073	50.2
Ignacio De La Fuente	27,647	33.0
Nancy J. Nadel	10,949	13.1
Ron "Oz" Oznowicz	1,834	2.2
Arnie L. Fields	857	1.0
Hector "Reno" Reyna	348	0.4
Write-in votes	122	0.1
