= Desley Brooks =

American politician

Member of the Oakland City Council from District 6
- In office 2002–2018
- Preceded by: Moses Mayne
- Succeeded by: Loren Taylor

Vice Mayor
- In office January 2011 – January 2018
- Preceded by: Ignacio De La Fuente
- Succeeded by: Rebecca Kaplan

Personal details
- Education: University of Washington (BA); Seattle University (JD)

Desley Brooks is a politician in Oakland, California. She served as a Councilmember on the Oakland City Council from 2002 to 2018. In January 2011, Brooks was also inaugurated as the vice mayor of Oakland.

== Early life and education ==
Brooks was born in New Orleans, and she grew up in Los Angeles and Seattle. She holds a B.A. in political science from University of Washington and a J.D. from Seattle University. Prior to her service on the city council, Brooks served Chief of Staff to Alameda County Supervisor Keith Carson.

== Council career ==
Brooks was first elected to the council in 2002, taking the seat formerly held by Moses Mayne.

In 2002, Brooks listed endorsements by a number of individuals, including sitting city council member Nancy Nadel and civil rights attorney Dan Siegel.

In 2008 Brooks sued the San Francisco Chronicle for libel. That case, Brooks v. San Francisco Chronicle, was ultimately dismissed.

In 2009, Brooks was involved in a three-month dispute with fellow Councilmember Jean Quan over who had the right to park in the "prized parking space" that had been parked in by Councilmember Henry Chang before he left office in 2008. They involved the city attorney, who generated a five-page legal memorandum on which of them had greater seniority; it concluded they had equal seniority. Not until the dispute was written up in The San Francisco Chronicle a month later did the claimants decide to settle the matter with a coin flip, which Brooks won.

In 2010 Brooks spoke on the one-year anniversary of the BART Police shooting of Oscar Grant.

In 2011 Council member Brooks was among the protestors sleeping in tents on the inaugural night of the Occupy Oakland encampment.

In 2012, Brooks put forward a public safety proposal calling for, among other things, better lighting in high crime areas of the city.

In 2017, with the pending adult use legalization of marijuana in California, Brooks lobbied equity amendments in the marijuana permit process that ensures half of all marijuana permits be given to individuals that were formerly convicted of marijuana related offenses or have lived in police beats that were disproportionately affected by the War on Drugs. The new system would also encourage general applicants to partner with equity applicants and provide either free rent or real estate for better priority in the permitting process.

In 2017, Brooks was found liable for $3.75 million for assaulting former Black Panther Elaine Brown.

In 2018, Brooks faced four challengers and was defeated by Loren Taylor, a biomedical engineer and management consultant, who won with 64.3% of the vote after five rounds of ranked-choice voting.

Since leaving office, Brooks moved to Seattle and was noted as the chairperson of the First African Methodist Episcopal Church of Seattle/Auburn's social action committee in October 2024.
