= Chappell Hayes =

American political activist

Chappell Hayes (1948–1994) was a political activist in West Oakland.

Hayes campaigned against polluting industries in West Oakland. Hayes fought against reconstruction of the Cypress Street Viaduct through the center of West Oakland, forced the port to spend millions on environmental initiatives and helped get like-minded residents elected to organizations throughout the Bay Area.

West Oakland's McClymonds High School's on-campus health clinic is named in his honor, as well as the observation tower in the Middle Harbor Shoreline Park.

Hayes was married to Oakland City Council member and 2006 mayoral candidate Nancy Nadel. He was father of Sele Nadel-Hayes.
