= East Bay Green Corridor =

The East Bay Green Corridor is a regional partnership working toward promoting the San Francisco East Bay as a global center of the emerging green economy. The members are thirteen East Bay cities, schools and research institutions. The partnership's stated goals are to attract and retain green businesses, promote research and technology transfer, strengthen green workforce development programs, and coordinate a regional effort to secure federal funding. West Berkeley activists have criticized the City of Berkeley's planned implementation of the corridor, over concerns that zoning regulations may be relaxed for the benefit of developers and large corporations, and could negatively impact the city's light manufacturing district.

== History ==
The East Bay Green Corridor was announced on December 3, 2007, at a new solar-energy facility in Richmond, California. The partnership had six founding members:

- City of Berkeley, represented by Mayor Tom Bates
- City of Emeryville, represented by Mayor Nora Davis
- City of Oakland, represented by Mayor Ron Dellums
- City of Richmond, represented by Mayor Gayle McLaughlin
- University of California at Berkeley, represented by Chancellor Robert Birgeneau
- Lawrence Berkeley National Laboratory, represented by Director Steven Chu

At a press conference to announce its creation, Berkeley Mayor Tom Bates predicted that "the Silicon Valley of the green economy is going to be here in the East Bay." The partners all pledge to hold an annual green economic summit, set quarterly meetings of the directors of economic development, workforce development and technology transfer offices, and to coordinate a major new regional green job training and placement effort.

== Expansion ==
In June 2009, the East Bay Green Corridor held its second annual summit at the Oakland Museum of California. Seven new members were announced:

- City of Alameda
- City of Albany
- City of El Cerrito
- City of San Leandro
- Peralta Community College District
- Contra Costa Community College District
- Cal State East Bay

At the summit, the partnership announced that it had secured its first direct funding, a federal earmark worth $147,000 for job training.

In August 2009, East Bay Green Corridor hired its first full-time director, Carla Din, who previously served as a director at the Apollo Alliance, a green energy nonprofit in San Francisco. Members of the partnership contribute $10,000 a year for staff salaries and marketing. The project is fiscally sponsored by the East Bay Economic Development Alliance, which also provides office space from its Oakland headquarters.

Plans for implementing the East Bay Green Corridor have led to a significant zoning controversy in Berkeley, particularly in the light industrial area known as West Berkeley. To entice green energy start-ups to the area, Bates and city planning staff have proposed changing existing zoning regulations and instituting a revised master use permit process. The effect of these proposed changes, according to media reports, would be to double the allowed height of new buildings and allow office complexes to be built.

A group of community activists known as West Berkeley Artisans and Industrial Companies (WeBAIC) have strongly opposed the zoning changes, arguing that they will hurt the economic vitality and unique character of the neighborhood. Some of the coalition's members have also argued that allowing developers to erect expensive condominiums and office buildings will price existing businesses out of the neighborhood and force their relocation.
