= Shadia Simmons =

Canadian actress (born 1986)

- Born: June 28, 1986 (age 38); Toronto, Ontario, Canada
- Occupation(s): Actress, teacher, director
- Years active: 1995–2009
- Children: 3
- Relatives: A.J. Saudin (Brother); Sabrina Saudin (Sister)

Shadia Simmons (born June 28, 1986) is a Canadian teacher, director and former actress. She is best known for her role as Corrine Baxter in the television series Strange Days at Blake Holsey High, her recurring role as Emily on Life with Derek, and for her starring role as Piper Dellums in The Color of Friendship (2000).

== Career ==
Her first film was Moonlight and Valentino, where she played the part of Jenny Morrow, the daughter of a character played by Whoopi Goldberg. She appeared in the Disney production A Saintly Switch and was cast in a number of Disney Channel Original Movies. Simmons has starred in four television series, Ace Lightning, I Was a Sixth Grade Alien, Life with Derek, and Strange Days at Blake Holsey High.

== Personal life ==
Simmons is the oldest of three siblings; she has a brother named A.J. and a sister named Sabrina, both of whom are professional actors. She also has three children, two daughters and a son.

== Teaching career ==
With her New York and Ontario teaching certification, she is now teaching at the High School level. Shadia is also a director at Star Acting Studios.

== Filmography ==
Year	Title	Role	Notes
1995	Moonlight and Valentino	Jenny Morrow	
1996	Goosebumps	Alicia	Episode: "Night of the Living Dummy II"
1996	Holiday Affair	Girl on Rollerblades	TV film
1997	In His Father's Shoes	Maggie	TV film
1997	Color of Justice	Harriet	TV film
1998	Noddy	Actor	TV series
1999	A Saintly Switch	Annette Anderson	TV film
1999	Dear America: A Picture of Freedom	Clotee	TV short
2000	The Color of Friendship	Piper Dellums	TV film
2000	Are You Afraid of the Dark?	A.J.	Episode: "The Tale of the Night Nurse"
2000	Quints	Zoe	TV film
2000	Virtual Mom	Amy	TV film
2000	The Sandy Bottom Orchestra	Jenny	TV film
2000	I Was a Sixth Grade Alien	October Wilde	13 episodes
2001	Zenon: The Zequel	Nebula Wade	TV film; replacing Raven-Symoné
2001–2002	The Zack Files	Sarah	6 episodes
2002	Girlstuff/Boystuff	Eva; Pretty Reporter	Episode: "Style 911/Eleven Minute Workout"; Episode: "Health Class Horrors/Lights, Camera, Ahhhh!"
2002	Too Young to Be a Dad	Blair	TV film
2002–2006	Strange Days at Blake Holsey High	Corrine Baxter	Main role, 38 episodes
2002–2004	Ace Lightning	Samantha Thompson	29 episodes
2005–2009	Life with Derek	Emily Davis	Recurring role, 47 episodes
