= Ed Blakely =

American academic (1938–2025)

Edward James Blakely
- Born: April 21, 1938; San Bernardino, California, U.S.
- Died: September 6, 2025 (aged 87); Sydney, New South Wales, Australia

Academic work
- Institutions: University of California at Berkeley, University of Sydney

Edward James Blakely (April 21, 1938 – September 6, 2025) was an American academic who, for most his career, was a professor of Urban Planning at the University of California at Berkeley. In 1994, he retired as a leading scholar in the field with award-winning books. He is known primarily for having been executive director of Recovery Management for the City of New Orleans.

== Early life and education ==
Blakely was born in San Bernardino, California, on April 21, 1938. He earned his B.A. from the University of California at Riverside, an M.A. in Latin American history from the University of California at Berkeley, a master of management from Point Loma Nazarene University, and a Ph.D. in education and management from the University of California at Los Angeles.

== Career ==
Blakely was elected a ward committeeperson in Pittsburgh, Pennsylvania.

=== Role in Oakland ===
For nearly a decade, Blakely worked as a consultant to Oakland, California, mayor Elihu Harris. He served as a member of the Oakland Private Industry Council. In 1998, Blakely ran to succeed Harris as mayor of Oakland and finished the election in a very distant second-place behind Jerry Brown.

In California, by 1998, Blakely also served as a member of the Santa Monica Mountains Authority (having been appointed by California Speaker Willie Brown); a member of the Presidio Trust (having been appointed by President Bill Clinton); a member of the California Commission on Advanced Technologies; and a member of the Los Angeles Private Industry Council.

=== Role in New Orleans ===
Blakely was hired by New Orleans Mayor Ray Nagin two years after Hurricane Katrina.

Blakely's role in New Orleans was never far from controversy: he was criticized for describing New Orleans as a "third world country" and its residents as "buffoons" and for not accomplishing enough. He alleged, in a speech in Sydney, that the actual population of New Orleans pre-Katrina was known to be slightly lower than the official number reported by the U.S. Census Bureau. He suggested this was not unusual since many cities need federal block grants based on population for federal grants. On another occasion he also analogized New Orleans to divided neighborhoods of Sunnis and Shias; at Johns Hopkins University he was alleged to have said that New Orleans needed birth control (Blakely responded that he never said this, his actual statement being only that the New Orleans public schools were unprepared to enroll a growing population of children). Additional targets of criticism were his "on loan" status in which he continued to receive part of his University of Sydney salary, which he was reportedly allowed since he had unpaid study leave accrued, while New Orleans paid him full-time and his alleged involvement in transparency issues similar to the New Orleans e-mail controversies. Blakely's New Orleans salary was $150,718 for 2007 and $154,510 for 2008.

According to the Times-Picayune, "Blakely has acknowledged that trying to shepherd a clumsy and sometimes-inept City Hall bureaucracy through the maze of federal rebuilding rules has been a challenge. He admits perhaps some of his early promises about a speedy recovery were overblown." Columnist James Gill used Blakely's resignation to poke fun at Nagin, who had professed being unable to remember the facts of certain controversies during Nagin's second term as mayor; Gill averred that Nagin and Blakely "complement each other admirably": "Nagin cannot remember things that did happen, while Blakely can effortlessly recall a bunch of things that didn't." Subsequently, Gill's fellow columnist Stephanie Grace asserted that Blakely and Nagin have behavioral similarities such as "unfulfilled promises" and cited a 2007 comment by Blakely that New Orleans would soon have construction "cranes in the sky" as part of the rebuilding effort.

In October 2009, Blakely again made controversial statements about the New Orleans recovery and his role in it. In a video interview on U.C. Berkeley's CalTV, Blakely said "I should have left a little earlier, for two reasons: One, my health wasn't good. Secondly, I had other things I wanted to do, and administering a recovery is not one of them." In the same interview, Blakely claimed that the people of New Orleans were lazy and virulently racist, and that "Unless the next mayor is very clever, it's going to explode and there are going to be race riots." Louisiana Lieutenant Governor Mitch Landrieu responded to published reports of Blakely's comments, saying that they were "offensive and untrue" and calling Blakely's tenure in New Orleans a "complete failure". To highlight Blakely's total failure at accomplishing anything during his time in New Orleans, he was quoted on February 23, 2011, as saying that about 30 percent of the New Orleans' residents flood victims have returned at the time of his departure. At the time of the interview two years later over 75 percent population increased with one of the highest numbers of newcomers to reach this figure.

=== Return to Australia ===
On May 6, 2009, Blakely announced his intention to resign from his position as "Recovery Czar" in New Orleans effective 2009 July 1 and to return to Australia. Simultaneous with his resignation, his agency was renamed the Office of Community Development, supervised by Blakely's deputy director Austin Penny. In a farewell presentation to the City Council's Recovery Committee, Blakely urged that New Orleans "face south" to increase trade with Latin America in view of the Panama Canal expansion project. He also recommended focusing the city's biomedical industry on tropical diseases and working on New Orleans East to rebuild Pendleton Memorial Methodist Hospital and to "let people know we're in the technology business" by making the Michoud Assembly Facility a tourist destination.

Shortly before his departure from New Orleans, Blakely was asked whether he would return if the city suffers a future disaster. Blakely's response:

"You don't invest this much time, this much heart without coming back. . . . I'm an American. I'm not going to let this city become an embarrassment."

When his role in New Orleans ended in 2009, Blakely returned to Australia's University of Sydney where he was a Professor of Urban and Regional Planning, before later joining the United States Studies Centre at the same university as an Honorary Professor in Urban Policy.

Blakely received multiple recognitions for his work in New Orleans including Key to the City from the City of New Orleans; The Eliot Richardson Lectureship & Award from the American Academy of Public Administration; The Jay Blakely Chatterjee Award for Service to the profession by the Collegiate Schools of Planning; Recognition for “social inclusion in disaster recovery” from UN Habitat; and the Planners of Color of the Collegiate Schools of Planning established the Edward J Blakely bi-annual award for "planning or related academics or to professionals who have supported the cause of social justice for communities of color in their work".

Blakely's name continued in the New Orleans news, as when Nagin was quarantined in China while on the way to a University of Sydney conference where Nagin was to discuss, according to the printed program, how he "launched several high-profile investigations that resulted in a paradigm shift that unleashed unprecedented economic development"—a statement which attracted a quip from satirical columnist James Gill:

"Shifting paradigms sounds like heavy work. Maybe Nagin borrowed a crane in the sky from Blakely."

In 2011 Blakely published a memoir about Katrina—a book which Gill reviewed scathingly, asserting that "It would take another book to list all the errors in Blakely's."

After his return to Sydney Blakely served several high-profile roles including District Commissioner of a newly established body the Greater Sydney Commission from 2015 to 2018 and Acting Commissioner of the State of New South Wales Land and Environment Court from 2018 to 2020.

Blakely completed a master's degree in law from Northwestern University in Chicago in 2018. He was a Justice of the Peace in New South Wales as well as a class B member (non-practicing) member of the New South Wales Bar. He was a consultant working on Affordable and Indigenous housing in Australia and a member of the OECD panel on Economic Development and employment. He was a regular visiting professor in Climate change and Disaster Management at the University of Venice, Italy.

Blakely was also an active qualified field referee in the senior and youth divisions US Football (called Gridiron) In Australia.

His most recent book with Richard Hu is Crafting Innovative Places for Australia’s Knowledge Economy 2019 Macmillan Books.

Blakely was a Fellow of the National Academy of Public Administration (United States). He was appointed a Member of the Order of Australia in the 2026 King's Birthday Honours in recognition of his "significant service to urban planning, to regional development, and to social justice".

== Death ==
Blakely died in Sydney on September 6, 2025, at the age of 87.
