= Oakland City Council =

Governing body of Oakland, California

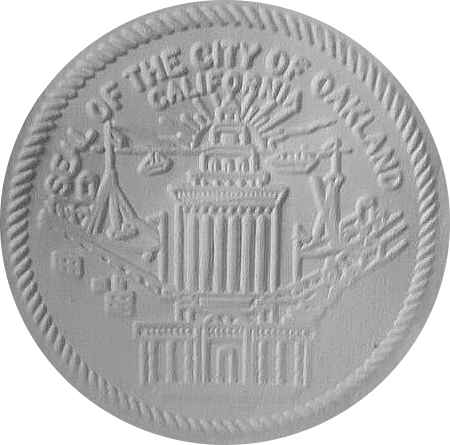

Type
- Type: Unicameral

Leadership
- President: Kevin Jenkins, Democratic
- President Pro Tem: Noel Gallo, Democratic

Structure
- Political groups: Officially nonpartisan: Democratic (8)
- Length of term: 4 Years

Elections
- Voting system: instant-runoff voting (all seats): Single-member districts (7); At-large (1)
- Last election: November 5, 2024
- Next election: November 3, 2026

Meeting place
- Oakland City Hall 1 Frank H. Ogawa Plaza, Oakland, CA 94612

Website
- https://www.oaklandca.gov/departments/oakland-city-council

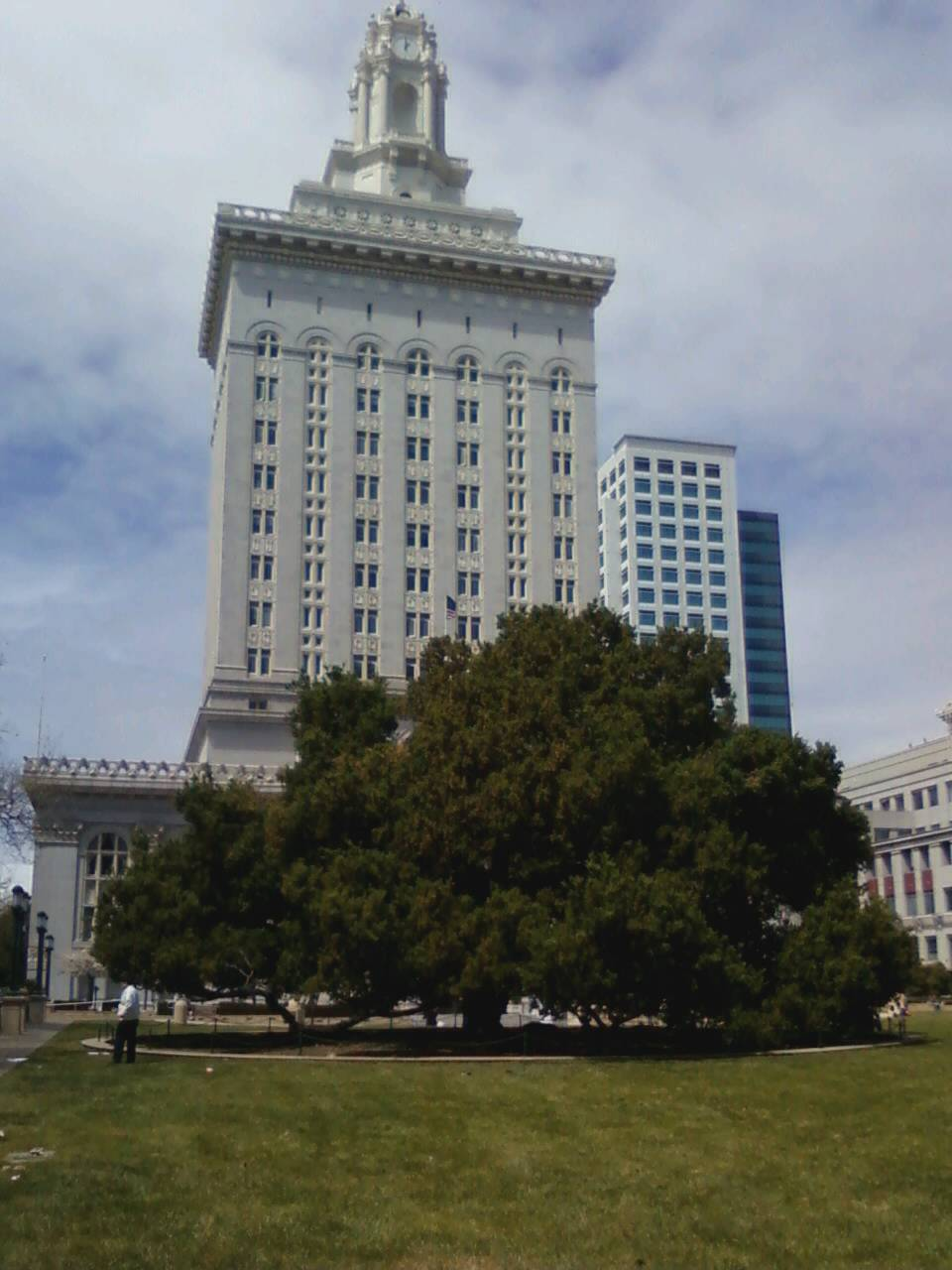
Oakland City Hall and Oak tree at Frank Ogawa Plaza

The Oakland City Council is an elected governing body representing the City of Oakland, California.

Since 1998, Oakland has had a mayor-council government. The mayor is elected for a four-year term. The Oakland City Council has eight council members representing seven districts in Oakland with one member elected at-large; council members serve staggered four-year terms, and are all elected using instant-runoff voting. The mayor appoints a city administrator, subject to the confirmation by the city council, who is the chief administrative officer of the city. Other city officers include: city attorney (elected), city auditor (elected), and city clerk (appointed by city administrator). Oakland's mayor is subject to a tenure limited to two terms. There are no term limits for the city council.

== Current Council ==
District	Councilmember	Party (officially nonpartisan)	First elected
1	Zac Unger	Democratic	2024
2	Charlene Wang	Democratic	2025
3	Carroll Fife	Democratic	2020
4	Janani Ramachandran	Democratic	2022
5	Noel Gallo (President Pro Temp)	Democratic	2012
6	Kevin Jenkins (President)	Democratic	2022
7	Ken Houston	Democratic	2024
At-large	Rowena Brown	Democratic	2024

== Past Councils ==
=== 2012 members ===
- District 1 – Dan Kalb (2013)
- District 2 – Patricia Kernighan (also Council President) (2005, ...) (re-elected 2010)
- District 3 – Lynette Gibson McElhaney (2013)
- District 4 – Libby Schaaf (2011, ...) (elected 2010)
- District 5 – Noel Gallo (2013)
- District 6 – Desley Brooks (2002, ...) (elected 2002, 2006, 2010)
- District 7 – Larry Reid (also Vice Mayor) (1997, ...) (re-elected in 2004, 2008, and 2012)
- Councilmember At Large – Rebecca Kaplan (also President Pro Tempore) (2009, ...) (2008, reelected in 2012)

=== 2016 members ===
- District 1 – Dan Kalb (2012)
- District 2 – Abel J. Guillen (elected 2014)
- District 3 – Lynette Gibson McElhaney (2012) (also Council President)
- District 4 – Annie Campbell Washington (2014)
- District 5 – Noel Gallo (2012)
- District 6 – Desley Brooks (2002, ...) (elected 2002, 2006, 2010, 2014)
- District 7 – Larry Reid (also President Pro Tempore) (1997, ...) (re-elected in 2000, 2004, 2008, 2012 and 2016)
- Councilmember At Large – Rebecca Kaplan (also Vice Mayor) (2009, ...) (2008, reelected in 2012, 2016)

=== 2018 members ===
- District 1 – Dan Kalb (elected in 2012, 2016) (President Pro Tempore)
- District 2 – Nikki Fortunato Bas (elected in 2018)
- District 3 – Lynette Gibson McElhaney (elected in 2012,2016) (also Council President)
- District 4 – Sheng Thao (elected in 2018)
- District 5 – Noel Gallo (elected in 2012, 2016)
- District 6 – Loren Taylor (elected in 2018)
- District 7 – Larry Reid (elected in 1996, 2000, 2004, 2008, 2012 and 2016) (Vice Mayor)
- Councilmember At Large – Rebecca Kaplan (elected in 2008, 2012, 2016) (City Council Chair)

== Former Councilmembers ==
- Frank H. Ogawa, first Japanese American on the City Council, served from 1966 until his death in 1994.
- Henry Chang, Jr appointed to at-large seat 1994 after death of Frank Ogawa, elected in 1997. Served until 2009.
- Jean Quan, councilmember for District 4 from 2003–2011, subsequently elected mayor, then defeated for re-election to mayor.
- John A. Russo, served 1994–2000
- Danny Wan, served 2000–2005
- Moses Mayne
- Wilson Riles (son of Wilson Riles, Sr.), councilmember from 1979 to 1992
- Nancy Nadel, served 1996–2012
- Ignacio De La Fuente, served 1992–2012
- Libby Schaaf, former Oakland mayor
- Desley Brooks, served 2002–2018
- Sheng Thao, Oakland mayor from 2023 to 2024
- Abel Guillen, served 2014–2018
- Annie Campbell Washington, served 2014–2018
