= McClymonds Educational Complex =

Coordinates: 37°49′4.82″N 122°16′43.03″W

EXCEL High School

Location
- 2607 Myrtle Street; Oakland, California; United States

Information
- Type: Public secondary
- Established: August 29, 2005
- School district: Oakland Unified School District
- Grades: 9-12
- Campus: Urban, shared with BEST High School
- Colors: Orange and black
- Mascot: Warrior
- Website: http://www.excelhs.com

BEST High School

Location
- 2607 Myrtle Street; Oakland, California; United States

Information
- Type: Public secondary
- Established: August 29, 2005
- School district: Oakland Unified School District
- Grades: 9-12
- Campus: Urban, shared with EXCEL High School
- Colors: Orange and black
- Mascot: Warrior

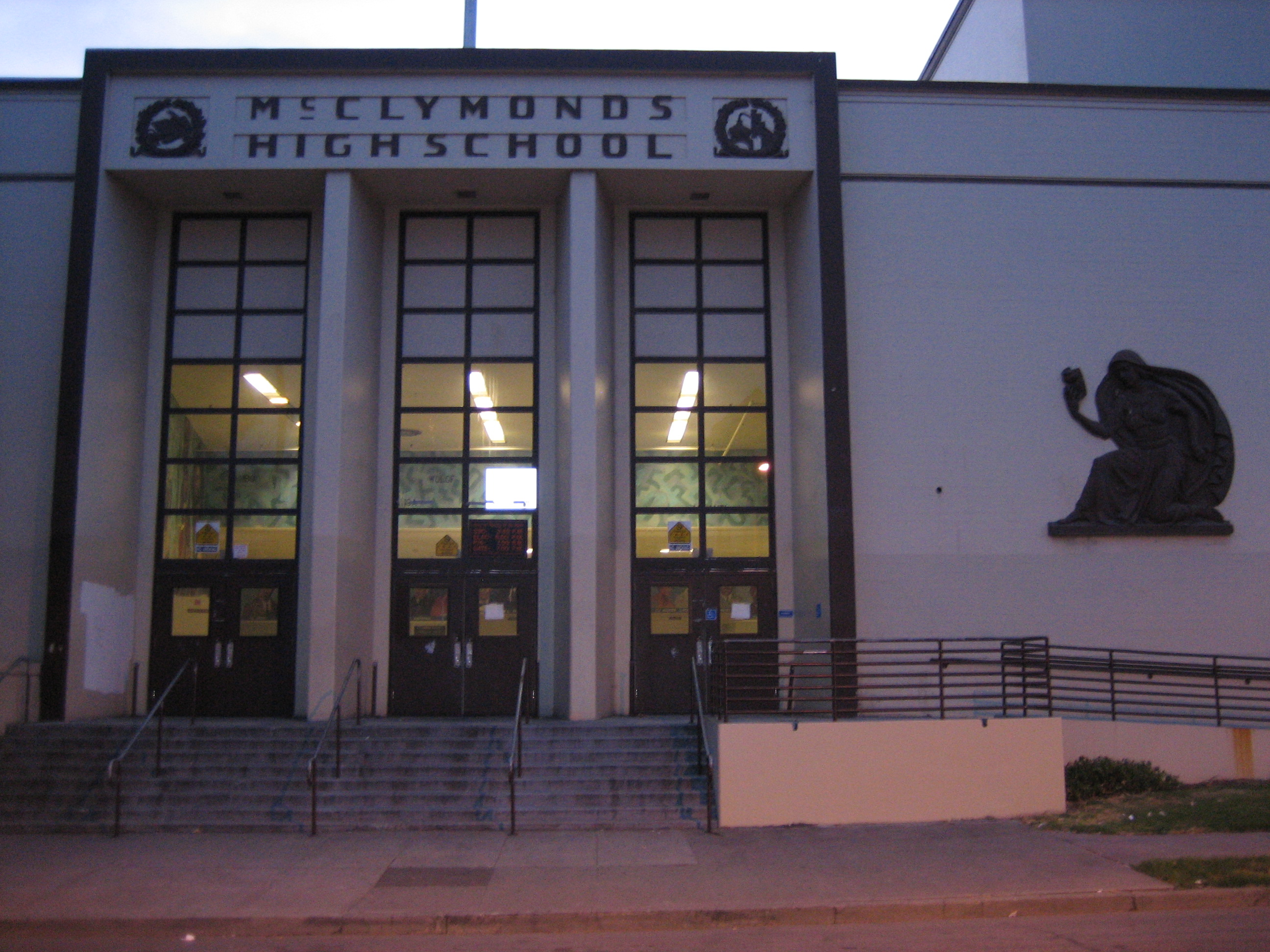
A view of the entrance of McClymonds Educational Complex. Note the sign still saying McClymonds High School.

McClymonds Educational Complex was the collective name of the two small high schools occupying the building of McClymonds High School, operated by the Oakland Unified School District from August 2005 to 2010.

As of 2010, the complex has returned to being a single high school, McClymonds High School.

== History ==
McClymonds High School was established in 1915. After 90 years, on August 29, 2005, it was divided into three smaller schools: EXCEL High School (Experience, eXcellence, Community, Empowerment, and Leadership), BEST High School (Business Entrepreneurial School of Technology), and Kizmet Academy (slogan: "Students Destined for Greatness"), a middle school.

EXCEL and BEST each served about 300-400 high school students in the 2005-06 school year, while Kizmet Academy served approximately 150 middle school students. In the 2007-08 year, a total of 508 students were enrolled, with 221 in BEST and 287 in EXCEL.

In the 2007-08 year, Kizmet Academy was discontinued. EXCEL and BEST remained in operation until 2010, when McClymonds Educational Complex returned to being McClymonds High School.

There was an adult school located on the campus as well.

== EXCEL High School ==
EXCEL High School was focused on preparing its students for postsecondary education. Through its SMArt (Storytelling, Media, and Art) Academy, EXCEL offered video production. Its Law and Government Academy competed in Mock Trial with other high schools such as Piedmont High School. EXCEL also offered AVID classes.

EXCEL High School created Akanke, a chapter of Daughters of Queens Sorority, Inc., the first high school sorority in Northern California.

As of 2006, EXCEL possessed an API score of 568, a statewide rank of 1, and a similar schools rank of 6.

== BEST High School ==
BEST was a college preparatory high school with an entrepreneurship emphasis. The expectation that every student would achieve educational excellence with academic support was inherent in the school's philosophy. Small classes and close interaction with experienced and dedicated faculty were a hallmark of education at BEST. The teacher-to-student ratio was about 1:25.

BEST, through its Culinary Arts Academy, offered cooking and food science, and through its ACE Academy, it offered wood shop and business management. BEST offered business classes, with the NFTE curriculum, in which students were able to complete business plans and compete for scholarships.

As of 2006, BEST possessed an API score of 486, a statewide rank of 1, and a similar schools rank of 2.
