= Lynette Gibson McElhaney =

American politician

Member of the Oakland City Council from District 3
- In office 2012–2020

Lynette Gibson McElhaney is an American politician and former member of the Oakland City Council in Oakland, California. She was elected to her first term holding the District 3 Oakland City Council seat in 2012 after the retirement of four-term incumbent Nancy Nadel. In 2015, she was named one of San Francisco Business Times' "most influential women in Bay Area business" and was reelected to City Council in 2016.

== Early life and professional career ==
Lynette Gibson McElhaney is a first generation Californian born and raised in San Diego, a child of Southern migrants. Her father Eddie Gibson (deceased), was a union machinist and her mother Barbara Gibson (deceased), retired as a telecommunications worker.

=== Education ===
McElhaney holds a B.A in political science from University of California Berkeley. In addition to her work as an elected leader she is a mentoring member of the International John Maxwell Team, where she provides leadership development training and coaching for Fortune 500 businesses and individuals, equipping youth and adults with the skills to lead and excel through troubled times.

=== Professional career ===
Before entering politics, she worked for the City of Oakland Community and Economic Development Department (formerly the Office Housing & Neighborhood Development) in the Emergency Housing division working on homelessness.

After leaving the City of Oakland, McElhaney began her career with the non-profit community development corporation Richmond Neighborhood Housing Services (NHS), serving as the Assistant to the executive director and Program Manager for homebuyer education. In 2001 she was appointed CEO of Richmond NHS where she oversaw rental housing, new construction and rehabilitation projects.

=== Elected career ===
McElhaney was elected President of the Oakland City Council in January 2015 on a 6–1 vote becoming the first African American woman to hold the position. McElhaney is currently serving her second term on the Oakland City Council. City of Oakland District 3

=== Other positions ===
McElhaney currently sits as the Chair of Oakland's Finance Committee. She also sits on the East Bay Economic Development Alliance Board, the Association of Bay Area Governments, and the Alameda County and Oakland Community Action Program.

== Legislative career ==
=== CSEC ===
On June 18, 2013, McElhaney forwarded legislation created by the Oakland Youth Commission concerning CSEC Awareness and Prevention (Commercial Sexual Exploitation of Children). The legislation lead to the creation of a CSEC task force staffed by representatives of the city, Oakland Unified School District, Oakland police department, victims of CSEC, community-based organizations and parents.

=== Measure Z ===
In 2014 McElhaney was a proponent in the advocacy and passage of Public Safety and Services Violence Prevention Act of 2014, commonly known as Ballot Measure Z. Measure Z was proposed to extend the $22 million in taxes collected by Measure Y needed for crucial violence safety and violence prevention services that were set to expire in 2014. Measure Z funds police, fire, and violence prevention services that assist at-risk youth, young adults, and crime victims and passed with resounding success garnering 77.49% of the vote (needing 66.7% to pass). After its passage, McElhaney stated "I’m so grateful that the citizens have chosen to maintain these investments in police services and programs that stand in the breach for the families that are impacted by violence and provide a pathway back for those who have paid their debt to society."

=== Department of Violence Prevention (DVP) ===
Despite increases to police budgets and Measure Z services, the city was still having difficulty reducing homicides below the 5 year average of 93 a year, a problem disproportionately affecting young black men and communities of color. In 2015, McElhaney personally experienced this problem when she lost her grandson, Torian Hughes, who was slain in a robbery on Mandela Parkway.

In an effort to rein in the violence that has plagued Oakland for years, Council President Larry Reid and McElhaney proposed the creation of a Department of Violence Prevention in 2017. The DVP adopts a public health approach in its work on homicide reduction, domestic violence prevention, anti-child trafficking measures, improved prosecutions and victim assistance.

On June 20, 2017, the City Council voted in favor of the DVP with a 6–1 vote. Six months after being hired, the new chief of violence prevention will present possible actions to the city council.

=== Compassionate Communities ===
In mid-October 2016, McElhaney and Alameda County Supervisor Keith Carson began the Compassionate Communities Pilot with the aim of first providing better quality of living and hygienic conditions then housing opportunities for 40 homeless encampment residents under the 580 Freeway on Magnolia St. A 2015 "Point in Time" tally counted almost 2,200 homeless people in Oakland, three fourths of which live in McElhaney's district which includes Downtown and West Oakland.

The Compassionate Communities Pilot marked a strategy shift from camp abatements to a different approach of viewing the "homeless as constituents to be served, not problems to be solved". The Compassionate Communities Pilot, billed at $190,000, brought services like waste pickup, porta-potties, a mobile health clinic, large concrete barriers to the encampment along with social services and relief employees to help residents of the camp find permanent housing. Proponents of the project believed that with a reliable and sanitary place to pitch their tents, unsheltered residents could have more time and energy to find a more stable place to live.

Recommendations from the Ella Baker Center for Human Rights 2017 report "Public Safety Begins with Public Health" included "expand[ing] emergency housing options like the Compassionate Communities pilot program to allow for development and maintenance of additional homeless encampments." Oakland's current outdoor navigation centers utilizing Tuff Sheds to provide emergency housing was inspired by the Compassionate Communities Pilot.

=== Adoption of "Love Life" as Oakland's Motto ===
McElhaney worked with Donald Lacy of the Love Life Foundation to convince the Oakland City Council to adopt "Love Life" as its official motto. The motto honors Donald Lacy's 16-year-old daughter, LoEshe Lacy, as well as other victims of violence. It was inspired by LoEshe's name, which translates to "Love Life" in a Nigerian dialect, as well as the anti-violence campaign she began. On April 5 Oakland City Council voted 5–3 to approve the resolution. The motto has been added to "Welcome to Oakland" signs that greet visitors entering the city.

== Ethics charges ==
McElhaney has been under investigation by Oakland's newly formed Public Ethics Commission (PEC) over her involvement in blocking a multi-unit housing project next door to her home. A commission staff report alleged that McElhaney sought free professional help from an architectural firm, JRDV Urban International, worth $800 to oppose the project. McElhaney failed to report the assistance as a gift to a public official, and meanwhile took part in council votes to extend and expand JRDV's city contracts. In an annual June report, The Alameda County Civil Grand Jury had found that Gibson McElhaney used her political resources to block the development, violating government ethics and conflict of interest rules.

Following a failure to submit documents to the PEC since July 2016, in October 2016, the Public Ethics Commission filed a suit asking Gibson McElhaney to release documents. In August 2017, the PEC voted to send the matter to an administrative law judge to hear McElhaney's and the commission's arguments and create a recommendation of how the PEC should proceed. The judge recommended a $8,625 penalty stating that her failure to comply with the subpoena and other conduct amounted to "aggravating factors" and a refusal to cooperate. McElhaney claimed her failure to respond at that time was due her grieving the death of her grandson. The PEC ultimately levied a drastically reduced fine of $2,550 after a show of support from her constituents and supports as well as hours of comments.

According to McElhaney, her neighbors had brought the issue to her and that the City Attorney's Office had guided her through the process. She viewed the architect's work not as a personal gift but as a service to residents of her district stating "the community felt that our concerns were being ignored so I asked a local respected architect for help on this specific technical question. If I had thought asking the architect for help could implicate the ethics laws, I of course would not have done so. While accepting the reduced fine, McElhaney shared appreciation with the commissioners but also remarked that she thought the years long probe was a waste of public money stating "It still feels unfair but it's far less egregious."

In 2020, Gibson McElhaney was associated with a different ethics investigation because campaign contributions made to her and four other councilmembers were allegedly linked to a contractor seeking a favorable legal decision and a land deal. Public Ethics Commission investigators believe the owners of California Waste Solutions, including David Duong and his son, Andy Duong, funneled money over several election cycles through "straw donors" to multiple councilmembers’ campaign committees.
