= McClymonds High School =

Coordinates: 37°49′4.82″N 122°16′43.03″W

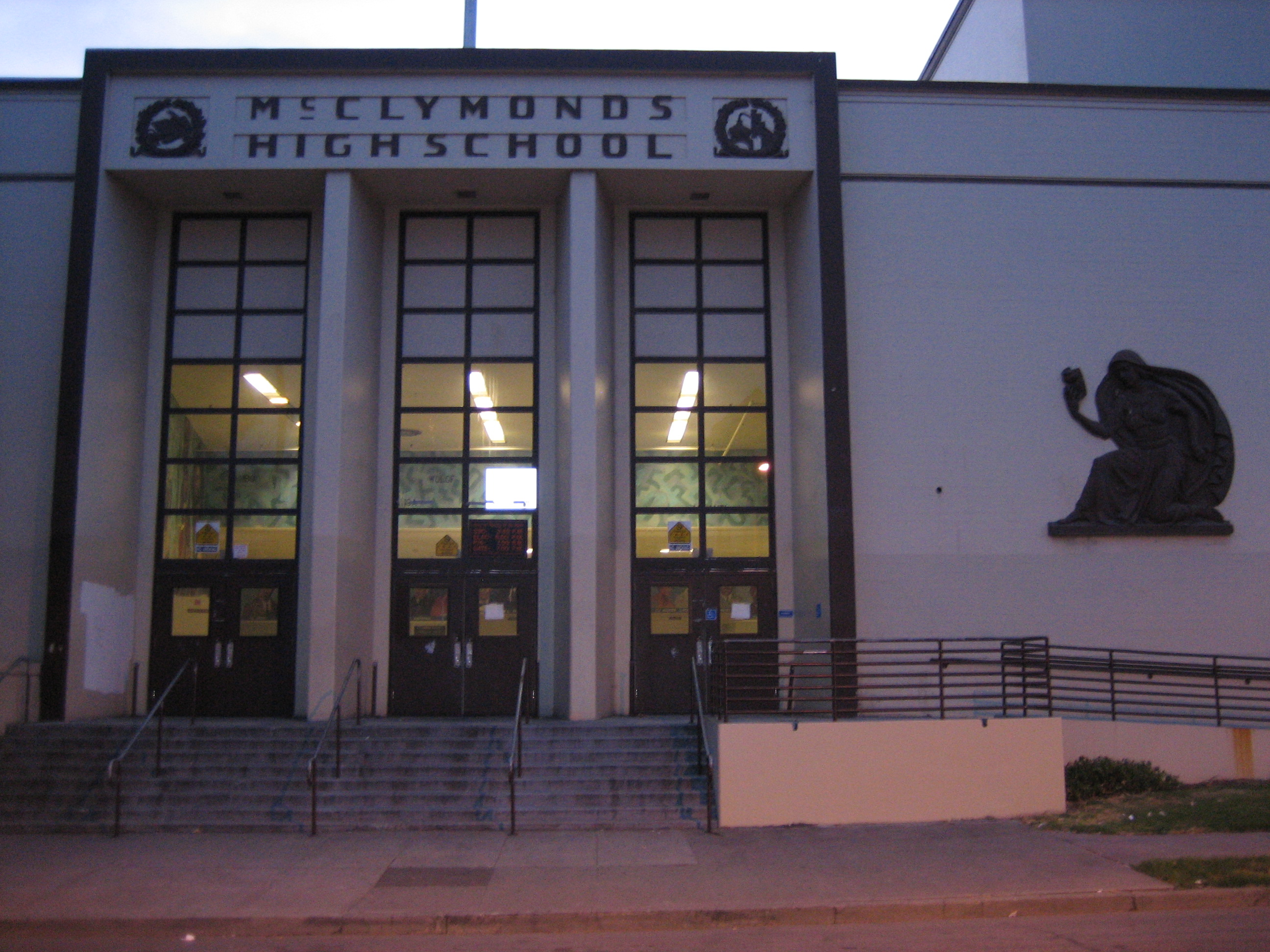

Location
- 2607 Myrtle Street; Oakland, California 94607; United States

Information
- Type: Public secondary
- Motto: 'School of Champions'
- Established: 1915
- School district: Oakland Unified School District
- NCES District ID: 0628050
- NCES School ID: 062805011555
- Teaching staff: 21.99 (FTE)
- Grades: 9-12
- Enrollment: 265 (2023–2024)
- Student to teacher ratio: 12.05
- Colors: Orange and black
- Mascot: Warrior
- Website: mcclymonds.ousd.org

McClymonds High School is a public high school in the West Oakland neighborhood of Oakland, California, United States. In addition to being the third oldest high school in Oakland, it is the only comprehensive high school in West Oakland, operated by the Oakland Unified School District. It was nicknamed the "School of Champions" in the early 1960s, after a number of award-winning athletes attended.

== History ==
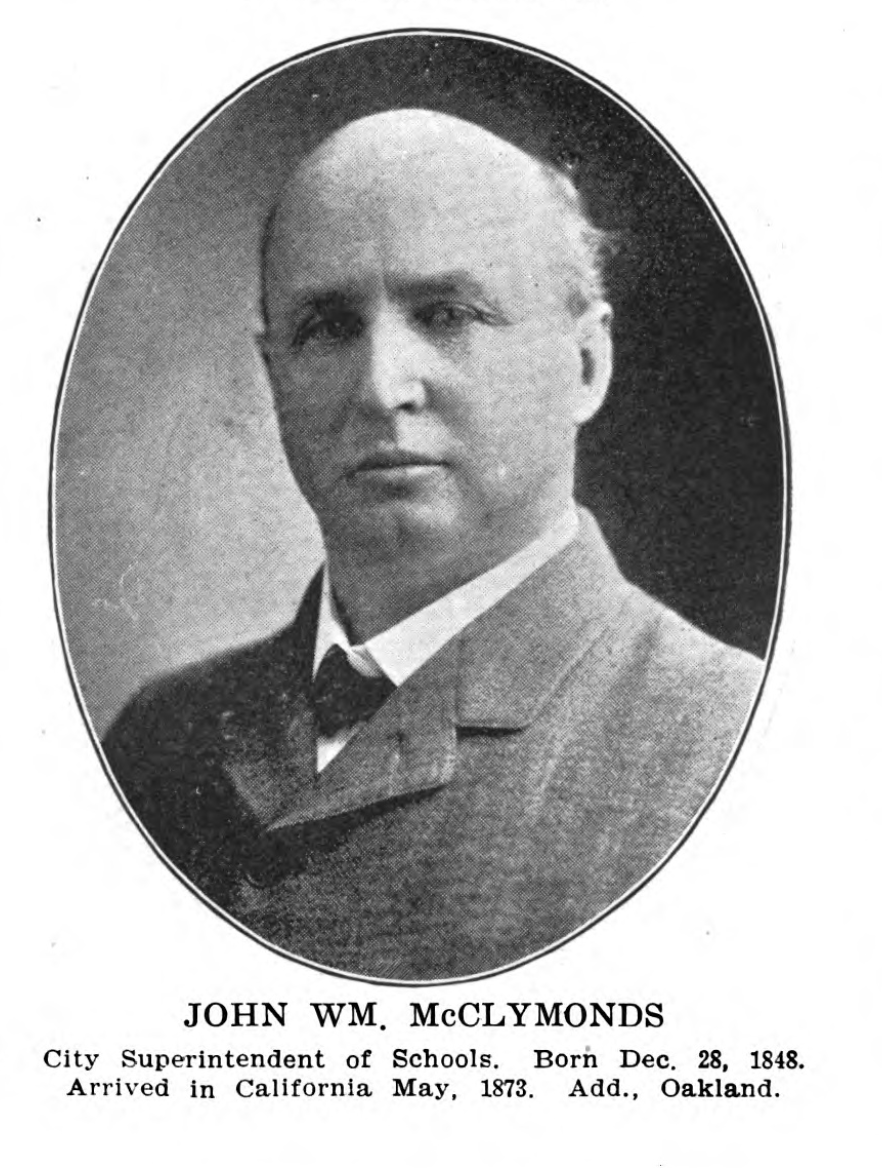
John William McClymonds, former district superintendent and namesake of the school

=== Early history (1915–2005) ===
It started in January 1915 in a small building formerly occupied by Oakland Technical High School. Originally, 60 students were enrolled in the school, which at that time was called Vocational High School. It was the first public school in California to offer summer school. McClymonds High School was once a predominantly white school. Demographic changes in the 1940s and 1950s transformed McClymonds into a predominantly Black high school.

The school was named after John W. McClymonds, who at one time was the superintendent of the Oakland Unified School District. Ida Louise Jackson, the first black teacher in the Oakland district, taught history classes at McClymonds before her retirement in 1953.

In 1927, with US$325,000 spent on additional classrooms, the school became more of a regular school than a summer school. In 1933, the legislative act was passed, regulating school building construction. This required that schools have steel and structural support on the inside. The building did not meet these requirements.

The school board decided to move to the campus to 14th and Myrtle Street in the same building with Lowell Junior High School. McClymonds High thereby became a four year high school. The name changed from J.W. McClymonds to Lowell McClymonds, then to McClymonds Lowell High School. Finally, in September 1938, the official name of the school became McClymonds, and it was moved to 26th and Myrtle.

In 1962, Afro-American Association sponsored the “Mind of the Ghetto” Conference which was held at McClymonds High School, featured a speech by Rev. Dr. Martin Luther King Jr.; and in attendance was many Black leaders including Malcolm X, young Muhammad Ali, Floyd McKissick, Cecil B. Moore, Huey P. Newton, Wil Ussery, Thomas Berkley, and Paul Cobb. The Afro-American Association also held a demonstration at the school in 1963 about the importance of staying in school and studying.

In 1982, twelve students from the basketball team at McClymonds High School were able to travel to Dakar, Senegal as a goodwill ambassador trip. The McClymonds students were able to fundraise US$30,000 in order to afford the travel; they visited Gorée island, participated in local festivals, and numerous activities like museum visits. Oakland mayor Lionel Wilson declared October 1981 as "McClymonds in Africa month" during their fundraising.

In the 1990s, the school and the school district was troubled by an increase of violence; during that time the school board had adopted an enforced dress code districtwide (no expensive jewelry, no track suits, and no shorts), and had entertained the idea of a school uniform. By 1994, the school board had also considered closing the campus due to the decade-long low attendance, high levels of drop out and school suspension, and the acts of violence on campus.

In 2004, many students were working in conjunction with students from nearby UC Berkeley to revitalize a dilapidated drug-ridden park into a history learning park and expand it into the school's campus. McClymonds was featured in the book Black in School: Afrocentric Reform, Urban Youth & the Promise of Hip-Hop Culture (2004), by Shawn Ginwright.

=== McClymonds Educational Complex (2005–2010) ===
Between 2005 and 2010, McClymonds was split into three smaller schools: BEST, EXCEL, and Kizmet Academy, collectively known as McClymonds Educational Complex.

=== "Mack Is Back!" (2010–present) ===
In 2010, McClymonds Educational Complex returned to being McClymonds High School. The school's 2010–2011 theme was "Mack is Back!"

On September 24, 2010, the school opened a new, state-of-the-art football field, William Belford Stadium, named in honor of the late William "Bill" Belford (often called the "godfather" of McClymonds sports).

== Academics ==
McClymonds's average SAT score for 2013 was 1155 out of 2400. The nation's average SAT score for the year was 1497.

In 2007, McClymonds had over 100 graduates. In 2008, McClymonds had the highest CAHSEE test scores in the Oakland Unified School District. McClymonds High School's graduation rate is over 80%, surpassing the District's graduation rate, which is around 74%.

There are two career pathways at McClymonds: Engineering and Entrepreneurship. Students choose their pathway toward the end of their freshman year, after being exposed to various pathway and career exploration activities. Entrepreneurship students have the opportunity to gain a Certificate of Entrepreneurship from Merritt College through their dual enrollment partnership and 5-course sequence.

== Sports ==
McClymonds offers a variety of sports, including football, baseball, basketball, cross-country, track, tennis, and volleyball. Many of McClymonds athletes have prospered professionally, from basketball (Bill Russell, Paul Silas, Joe Ellis, Antonio Davis) and football (Wendell Hayes, Marcus Peters) to baseball (Frank Robinson, Vada Pinson, Curt Flood, Lee Lacy) and track (Jim Hines).

=== Basketball ===
The McClymonds varsity basketball team won a state Tournament of Champions held in 1978 at the Oracle Arena. On March 15, 2008, McClymonds achieved its first ever Division I state championship basketball win over Dominguez High School of Compton, California, 73–54, at the Arco Arena, as the culmination of their undefeated streak of 32 wins and no losses.

=== Football ===
On May 16, 2006, the Oakland City Council adopted a resolution, sponsored by Council Member Nancy J. Nadel (District 3), congratulating the McClymonds Football Team For Excellence in Athletics and Academics, recognizing that McClymonds High School had ranked #1 in the East Bay and Northern California as the high school with the most football players (9) attending Division I universities, under the direction of head football coach Alonzo Carter. McClymonds was the only high school in the nation that year with three Top 100 prospects, and, with only 600-650 students, ranked #1 in Northern California for Division I Signees, and ranked #2 in the State, behind Long Beach Poly, which had 5,000 students.

The McClymonds varsity football team, led by captain Dwayne Washington, won the Division 5A state championship in January 2017. The Warriors defeated the La Jolla Country Day HS with a score or 20–17. The following year, McClymonds won a second consecutive state championship, defeating the Golden West High School Trailblazers in the California Division 5AA Football Championship 42–12.

== Facilities ==
=== Chappell Hayes Health Center ===
McClymonds' health center, founded by Children's Hospital doctor and UC Berkeley alumna Barbara Staggers, and named after activist Chappell Hayes, was opened in 2005. In creating the Health Center, Dr. Staggers partnered with Lisa Hardy, MD., Division Chief of Psychiatry at Children's, to ensure that mental health services would also be available to the school community. It serves McClymonds' students and alumni, and members of the West Oakland community.

=== Library Innovation Technology center ===
In 2023, McClymonds opened a Library Information Technology (LIT) center. The center was funded by local bond measures and includes a cafe, a library, a maker space, and an Africana center.

According to Leah Jensen, who runs the center, McClymonds is one of only two Oakland Unified School District comprehensive high schools that have fully functional libraries. The center has a mural painted by Daniel Galvez which depicts images from Oakland and Black history, including Lake Merritt, Black cowboys, and people such as Angela Davis, Huey P. Newton, Barack Obama, Frank Robinson and Bill Russell.

== Notable alumni ==
- Vince Albritton, former NFL safety
- Odis Allison, NBA player
- Michael Dansby, NFL cornerback for the Seattle Seahawks
- Antonio Davis, NBA player
- J. C. Davis, NFL guard for the New York Giants
- Ron Dellums, former U.S. Congressman and mayor of Oakland
- Joe Ellis, NBA player
- Curt Flood, MLB player in St. Louis Cardinals Hall of Fame (Flood v. Kuhn)
- MC Hammer, Grammy-winning rapper
- Richard "Dimples" Fields (1941–2000), R&B and soul singer
- John Handy, alto saxophonist, composer, arranger and world musician
- Kirk Morrison, former NFL linebacker
- Wendell Hayes, former NFL running back
- Jim Hines, Olympic gold medalist, 100 meters dash world record holder, first man to break 10 second barrier
- Leondaus "Lee" Lacy, MLB player, two-time World Series Champion
- Ernie Lombardi, Hall of Fame catcher for the Cincinnati Reds
- Dante Marsh, CFL cornerback for BC Lions
- Demetrius "Hook" Mitchell, one of the greatest street basketball players
- Marty Paich, jazz musician
- Marcus Peters, former NFL cornerback
- Nicholas Petris, California state senator
- Vada Pinson, MLB player in Cincinnati Reds Hall of Fame
- Aaron Pointer, MLB player and NFL referee
- Ruth Pointer, original member of The Pointer Sisters
- Billy Raimondi, baseball player
- Curt Roberts, first African American fielded by Pittsburgh Pirates
- Frank Robinson, MLB player and manager, Hall of Fame; first MLB player to win Most Valuable Player Award in both leagues
- Bill Russell, NBA Hall of Famer, 11-time NBA Champion (most championships by a player in NBA history)
- Roy Shivers, former NFL running back
- Paul Silas, NBA player and coach, member of College Basketball Hall of Fame
- Tony Simmons, former NFL and CFL defensive end
- Brandon Smith, CFL player for Calgary Stampeders
- Willie Tasby, MLB player
- Nate Williams, NBA player
- Michael White, jazz violinist
- Lionel Wilson, former mayor of Oakland, first African-American mayor of Oakland
- Ed Woods, college football defensive back for the Arizona State Sun Devils and the Michigan State Spartans
- Yahya Abdul-Mateen II, actor and architect
- LeRonne Armstrong, Chief, Oakland Police Department

Noah Johnson,UC Berkeley Graduate. Worked for Mayor Elihu Harris and Assembly-Woman, Barbara Lee.

== See also ==
- List of Oakland, California high schools
