= 1998 Oakland mayoral election =

Oakland mayoral election, 1998
- June 2, 1998
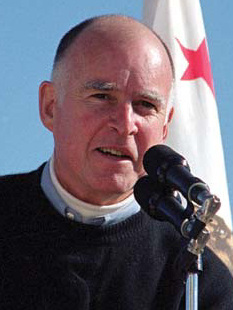

Candidate	Jerry Brown	Ed Blakely	Shannon Reeves
Party	Independent	Nonpartisan	Nonpartisan
Popular vote	48,129	12,226	5,679
Percentage	58.9%	14.9%	6.9%
Candidate	Ignacio De La Fuente	Mary V. King
Party	Democratic	Nonpartisan
Popular vote	5,509	4,618
Percentage	6.7%	5.6%
Mayor before election
Elihu Harris
Democratic
Elected mayor
Jerry Brown
Independent

The 1998 Oakland mayoral election was held on June 2, 1998, to elect the mayor of Oakland, California. It saw the election of Jerry Brown, the former and future governor of California, as mayor.

Brown won an outright majority in the first round of the election, forgoing the need for a runoff.

== Candidates ==
- Hugh E. Bassette, high school teacher
- Leo Bazile, attorney; former member of the Oakland City Council; former chairman of the Oakland Housing Authority. candidate for mayor in 1990
- Jerry Brown, former governor of California (1975–1983), former chair of the California Democratic Party (1989–1991), former Secretary of State of California (1971–1975), candidate for the Democratic nomination for President of the United States in 1976, 1980, 1992
- Ignacio De La Fuente, member of the Oakland City Council since 1992
- Ces Butner, businessman
- Ed Blakely, urban planner, consultant to mayor Elihu Harris
- Maria G. Harper, U.S. Postal supervisor
- Mary V. King, Alameda County Supervisor and 1994 mayoral candidate
- Audrey Rice Oliver, founder and CEO of Integrated Business Solutions; member of the California High Speed Ground Transportation Commission and U.S. Department of Transportation's MagLev Commission
- Shannon Reeves, head of Oakland NAACP (Republican)
- Hector Reyna, perennial candidate for mayor (in 1965, 1977, 1981, 1985, 1990) and for Oakland City Council (in 1963, 1967, 1975, 1979, 1983, 1987, 1992)

== Campaign ==
Incumbent mayor Elihu Harris opted against running for a third term.

Brown entered what was already a crowded mayoral field in late October 1997, instantly becoming the race's frontrunner. A poll published in The Montclarion right before he formally entered the race had shown Brown garnering 47% in a hypothetical race.

Brown identified himself to be an independent, having declared himself to have left the Democratic Party.

Brown ran under the campaign slogan "Oaklanders First". He campaign actively, holding many events.

Brown was endorsed by, among others, former Berkeley, California mayor Gus Newport.

Brown was the only white candidate running in the race. Oakland was and still is a majority minority city. Brown won a majority of the black vote.

Brown was heavily anticipated to win the election.

While Oakland had a weak mayor form of government, Brown was also campaigning to change this. He supported Measure X, a measure on the ballot in November 1998 which would change the city's model of government to a strong mayor for a period of 6 years. Ultimately, in November, Oakland's electorate voted by a landslide margin of 3 to 1 in support of Measure X, switching the city to a strong mayor system of governance prior to Brown taking office. Years later, in 2004, a referendum permanently extending Measure X later was passed, after failing to pass in 2002, making permanent the city's shift to the strong mayor model of governance.

== Results ==
Results
Candidate	Votes	%
Jerry Brown	48,129	58.9
Ed Blakely	12,226	14.9
Shannon F. Reeves	5,679	6.9
Ignacio De La Fuente	5,509	6.7
Mary V. King	4,618	5.6
Ces Butner	2,222	2.7
Audrey Rice Oliver	1,245	1.5
Leo Bazile	997	1.2
Hugh E. Bassette	518	0.6
Maria G. Harper	329	0.4
Hector Reyna	207	0.2
