= Ron Dellums =

American politician (1935–2018)

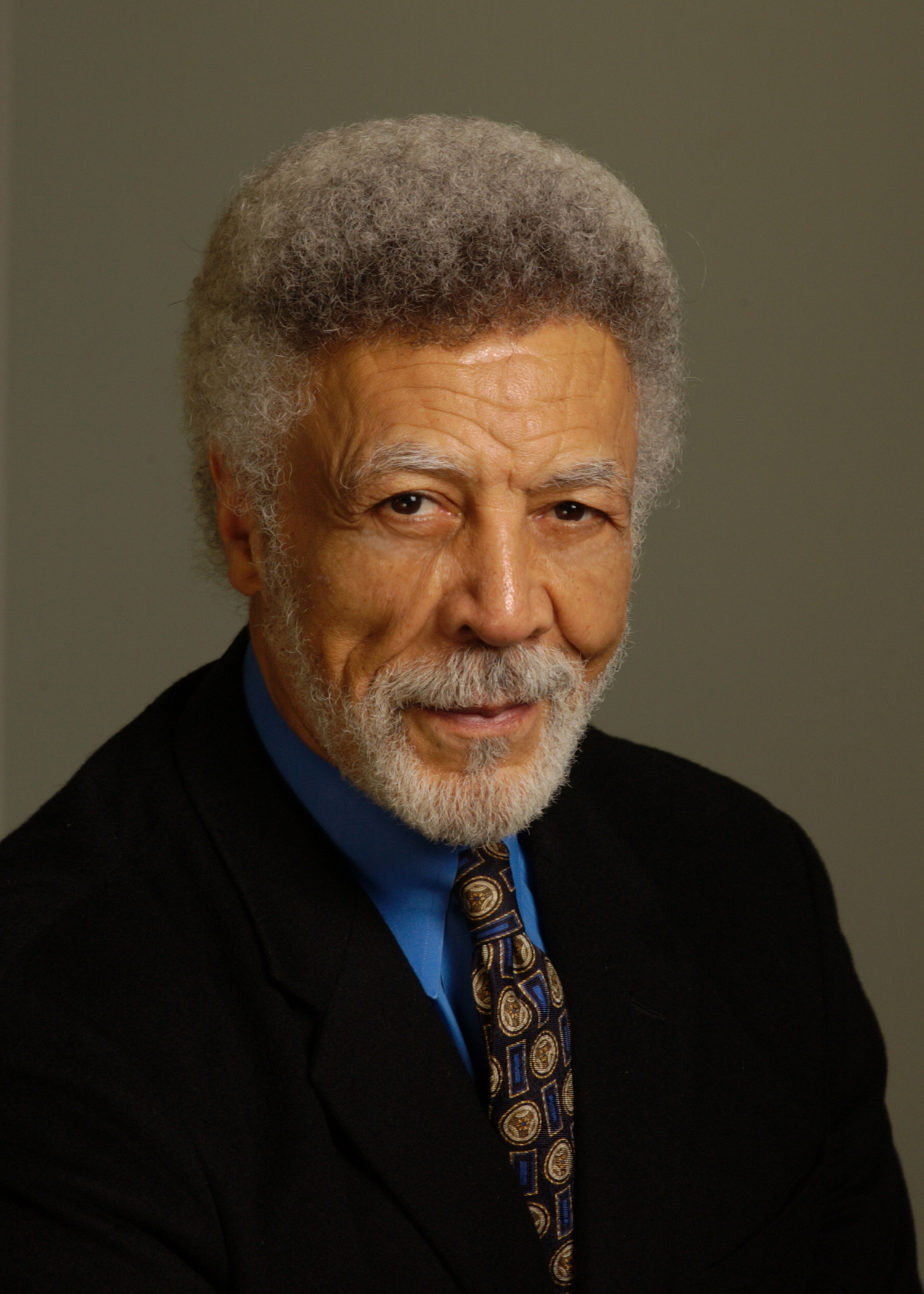
- Official portrait, 2007

48th Mayor of Oakland
- In office January 8, 2007 – January 3, 2011
- Preceded by: Jerry Brown
- Succeeded by: Jean Quan
House positions
Ranking Member of the House Armed Services Committee
In office January 3, 1995 – February 6, 1998
Preceded by	Floyd Spence
Succeeded by	Ike Skelton
Chair of the House Armed Services Committee
In office January 20, 1993 – January 3, 1995
Preceded by	Les Aspin
Succeeded by	Floyd Spence
Chair of the House District of Columbia Committee
In office January 3, 1979 – January 20, 1993
Preceded by	Charles Diggs
Succeeded by	Pete Stark

Member of the U.S. House of Representatives from California
- In office January 3, 1971 – February 6, 1998
- Preceded by: Jeffery Cohelan
- Succeeded by: Barbara Lee
- Constituency: 7th district (1971–1975); 8th district (1975–1993); 9th district (1993–1998)

Personal details
- Born: Ronald Vernie Dellums; November 24, 1935 Oakland, California, U.S.
- Died: July 30, 2018 (aged 82) Washington, D.C., U.S.
- Resting place: Arlington National Cemetery
- Party: Democratic
- Other political affiliations: Democratic Socialists of America (from 1982); DSOC (c. 1970s–1982)
- Spouses: Athurine Dellums (m. 1955; div. 1959); Roscoe Higgs (m. 1961; div. 1998); Cynthia Lewis (m. 2000)
- Children: 6, including Erik and Piper
- Relatives: C. L. Dellums (uncle)
- Education: Merritt College (attended); San Francisco State University (BA); University of California, Berkeley (MSW)

Military service
- Allegiance: United States
- Branch/service: United States Marine Corps
- Years of service: 1954–1956
- Rank: Private first class
- Dellums's voice Dellums outlining the conference report for the FY1995 National Defense Authorization Act. Recorded August 17, 1994

Ronald Vernie Dellums (November 24, 1935 – July 30, 2018) was an American politician who served as Mayor of Oakland from 2007 to 2011. Previously, served in the U.S. House of Representatives, representing California's 9th congressional district from 1971 to 1998, after which he worked as a lobbyist in Washington, D.C. Before that, he was on the Berkeley City Council from 1967 to 1970. He was a member of the Democratic Party.

Born into a family of labor organizers, Dellums was a psychiatric social worker and political activist in the African-American community before being elected to public office. In 1967, he was elected to the Berkeley, California, City Council. A socialist, Dellums was first elected to Congress in 1970, when he was recruited by anti-Vietnam War activists to defeat incumbent Jeffery Cohelan in the Democratic primary. He is the first openly socialist non-incumbent elected to Congress after World War II.

During his career in Congress, he fought the MX Missile project and opposed expansion of the B-2 Spirit stealth bomber program. He was a founding member of the Congressional Black Caucus and the Congressional Progressive Caucus. When President Ronald Reagan vetoed Dellums's Comprehensive Anti-Apartheid Act of 1986, a Democratic-controlled House and a Republican-controlled Senate overrode Reagan's veto, the first override of a presidential foreign-policy veto in the 20th century.

In 2006, Dellums was elected mayor of Oakland. He chose not to seek re-election in 2010.

== Early life and education ==
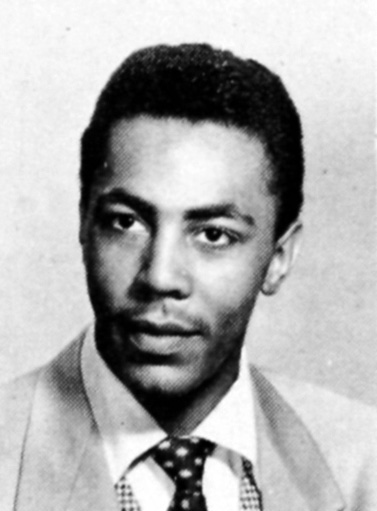
Dellums in the Oakland Technical High School yearbook, 1953

Dellums was born in Oakland, California, to Verney and Willa (Terry) Dellums. His father was a longshoreman. His uncle, C. L. Dellums, was one of the organizers and leaders of the Brotherhood of Sleeping Car Porters. He had a younger sister, Theresa. His mother Willa died on August 17, 2008, at the age of 89.

Dellums attended St. Patrick Catholic School, Oakland Technical High School and McClymonds High School. He served in the United States Marine Corps from 1954 to 1956. Dellums later received his A.A. degree from the Oakland City College, now Merritt College, in 1958, his B.A. from San Francisco State University in 1960, and his M.S.W. from the University of California, Berkeley in 1962. He became a psychiatric social worker and political activist in the African-American community beginning in the 1960s. He also taught at San Francisco State University and the University of California, Berkeley.

Dellums was a member of Alpha Phi Alpha fraternity. He was also a member of the fraternity's World Policy Council, a think tank whose purpose is to expand the fraternity's involvement in politics, and social and current policy to encompass international concerns.

Dellums was married three times. He married his second wife, attorney Leola "Roscoe" Higgs, in 1961. The two divorced in 1998. He married his third wife, Cynthia Lewis, in 2000.

One son, Michael, was convicted of a drug-related homicide in 1979, and remained in prison for decades, being repeatedly denied parole due to bad behavior. Dellums had five other children: anthropologist Rachel R. Chapman, professional actor Erik, author Piper, Brandon and Pam; six grandchildren: Danielle Henderson, Jacob Holmes, Sydney Ross, Dylan Ross, Olivia Dellums, and actress Solea Pfeiffer; and two great-grandchildren: Jared Henderson and Charli Henderson.

== Berkeley City Council ==
Dellums was elected to the Berkeley City Council, after prompting from Maudelle Shirek, and served from 1967 to 1970.

== U.S. House of Representatives ==
Flier for the Black Panther Party's Black Community Survival Conference in Oakland, March 1972

Dellums was elected to the United States House of Representatives in 1970 after being recruited by anti-Vietnam War activists to run against the incumbent, Jeffery Cohelan, a white liberal close to organized labor who had not opposed the war early enough to win reelection in the district. Dellums defeated Cohelan in the Democratic primary and won the general election, serving without interruption for 27 years.

In 1972, Dellums was reelected to Congress, 60 to 38 percent over his Republican opponent, Peter D. Hannaford, an advisor to then Governor Ronald Reagan.

As a socialist and prominent anti-Vietnam War activist, his politics earned him a place on the so-called Nixon's Enemies List, where his notation stated Dellums "had extensive EMK-Tunney support in his election bid."

=== Foreign policy ===
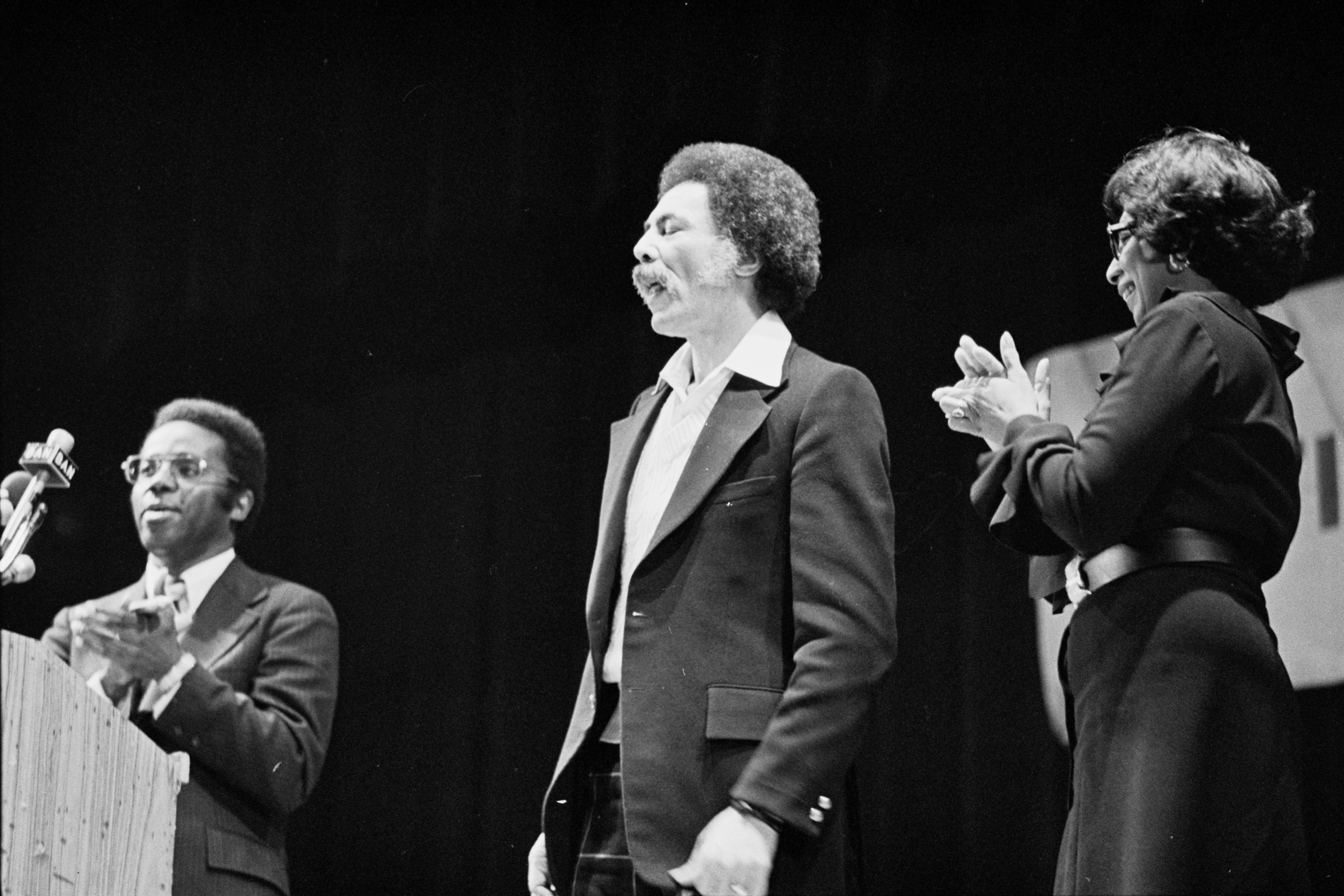
Dellums (center) gives a speech at the second National Black Political Convention as Richard G. Hatcher (left) and Hannah Atkins (right) applaud, March 1974

During his tenure in Congress, Dellums opposed every major American military intervention, except for emergency relief in Somalia in 1992. Dellums also supported the restriction of foreign aid to repressive African governments in Zaire (present-day DRC), Burundi, Liberia and Sudan.

==== Anti-apartheid campaign ====
In 1972, Dellums began his campaign to end the apartheid policies of South Africa. Fourteen years later, the U.S. House of Representatives passed Dellums's anti-apartheid legislation, calling for a trade restriction against South Africa and immediate divestment by American corporations. The bill, the Comprehensive Anti-Apartheid Act of 1986, had broad bipartisan support. It called for sanctions against South Africa and stated preconditions for lifting the sanctions, including the release of all political prisoners. President Reagan called for a policy of "constructive engagement" and vetoed the bill; however, his veto was overridden. It was the first override in the 20th century of a presidential foreign policy veto.

Dellums's fight against apartheid in South Africa was the subject of a Disney Channel made-for-TV film, The Color of Friendship, released in 2000. The role of Congressman Dellums was played in the film by actor Carl Lumbly.

==== Cold War conflicts in southern Africa ====
As part of the Cold War struggle for influence in southern Africa, the United States joined with the apartheid government of South Africa in support of UNITA, led by Jonas Savimbi, against the ultimately victorious Angolan forces of the MPLA supported by the Soviet Union and Cuba. Dellums was criticized for his support of Fidel Castro's involvement with the MPLA in Angola and was called "the prototype of the Castroite congressman" by the conservative press. He also introduced legislation (which was unsuccessful) in September 1987 to prohibit economic and military assistance to Zaire, citing poor human rights, corruption, and collaboration with South Africa.

==== Dellums v. Bush (1990) ====
In 1990, Dellums and 44 of his congressional colleagues sued then-president President George H. W. Bush in D.C. Federal District Court in 1990, in the case Dellums v. Bush, 752 F. Supp. 1141 (1990) attempting to halt a preemptive military buildup in the Middle East in response to Iraq's invasion of Kuwait. The plaintiff members of Congress asserted that military action without a declaration of war would be unlawful under U.S. Const. art. I, § 8, cl. 11 of the United States Constitution. Dellums v. Bush is notable in that it is one of only a few cases in which the Federal Courts have considered whether the War Powers Clause of the U.S. Constitution is justiciable in the courts. The Court in Dellums v. Bush indicated that, in that instance, it was, but because Congress had not yet acted as a majority, the lawsuit was premature.

==== Military budgets and arms control ====
Throughout his career Dellums led campaigns against an array of military projects, arguing that the funds would be better spent on peaceful purposes, especially in American cities. Programs he opposed included the Pershing II and MX missiles, and the B-2 bomber (popularly known as the "stealth bomber"). Because of his commitment to the closing of unneeded military bases, Dellums did not oppose the closing of the former Naval Air Station Alameda in his own district.

The B-2 Stealth Bomber is a long-range strategic bomber, that features stealth technology that makes it far less visible to radar. The B-2 was a major technological advance; however, it was designed during the Cold War for military scenarios that some argued were less relevant following the collapse of the Soviet Union. Its total program cost was estimated in 1997 at over US$2.2 billion per airplane.

Although Dellums opposed the B-2 project from the start, Congress approved initial funding for production of 135 bombers in 1987. However, with the winding down of the Cold War, total B-2 production was reduced to 21 aircraft in the early 1990s. But in 1997, seven former Secretaries of Defense signed a letter urging Congress to buy more B-2s, citing the difficulty of assembling a similar engineering team in the future should the B-2 project be terminated. Dellums, citing five independent studies consistent with his position, offered an amendment to that year's defense authorization bill to cap production of the bombers with the existing 21 aircraft. The amendment was narrowly defeated; nonetheless, Congress never approved funding for additional B-2 bombers.

==== Vietnam war crimes hearings ====
In January 1971, just weeks into his first term, Dellums set up an exhibit of Vietnam war crimes in an annex to his Congressional office, coordinated with the Citizens Commission of Inquiry (CCI). The exhibit featured four large posters depicting atrocities committed by American soldiers, embellished with red paint.

The My Lai massacre was followed shortly thereafter by a series of hearings on war crimes in Vietnam, which began April 25, 1971. Dellums had called for formal investigations into the allegations, but Congress chose not to endorse the proceedings. As such, the hearings were ad hoc and only informational in nature. As a condition of room use, press and camera presence were not permitted; however, the proceedings were transcribed. A small number of other anti-Vietnam War congressional representatives also took part in the hearings.

=== Integration of gays and lesbians in the military ===
In 1993, Dellums was chairman of the House Armed Services Committee. Though he argued in favor of integration, Dellums was the sole sponsor of H.R. 2401, introduced on June 14, 1993, adding language to the Defense Authorization Act of 1994 to ensure continued support for unit cohesion in the military. Although the bill contained that language, Dellums pointed out that he personally found the language unacceptable, stating in the Congressional Record on August 4, 1993: "The bill also contains at least one policy that, while unacceptable to this Member in substantive terms, is not as retrograde as it might have been: It supports the President and the Joint Chiefs of Staff on the issue of allowing gay and lesbian service members to serve their country." Remaining in the bill was Title V Section G "[e]xpresses as congressional policy the prohibition against homosexual conduct or activity in the armed forces. Requires separation from the armed forces for such conduct or activity. Directs the Secretary to ensure that the standards for military appointments and enlistments reflect such policy." Dellums's "yes" vote on the bill with the unit cohesion support language was the first time in his 22-year congressional tenure that he voted in favor of any defense spending bill, previously opposing them on economic principles. However, Dellums gave several economic reasons in the Congressional Record for his "yes" vote, on H.R. 2401, including that "It cuts ballistic missile defense to $3 billion—less than one-half the level planned by the Bush administration ..." and: "it devotes a record $11.2 billion to environmental cleanup and improvement, and does so in a way that will stimulate the development of new technologies and new markets for American firms".

=== U.S. House Committee positions ===
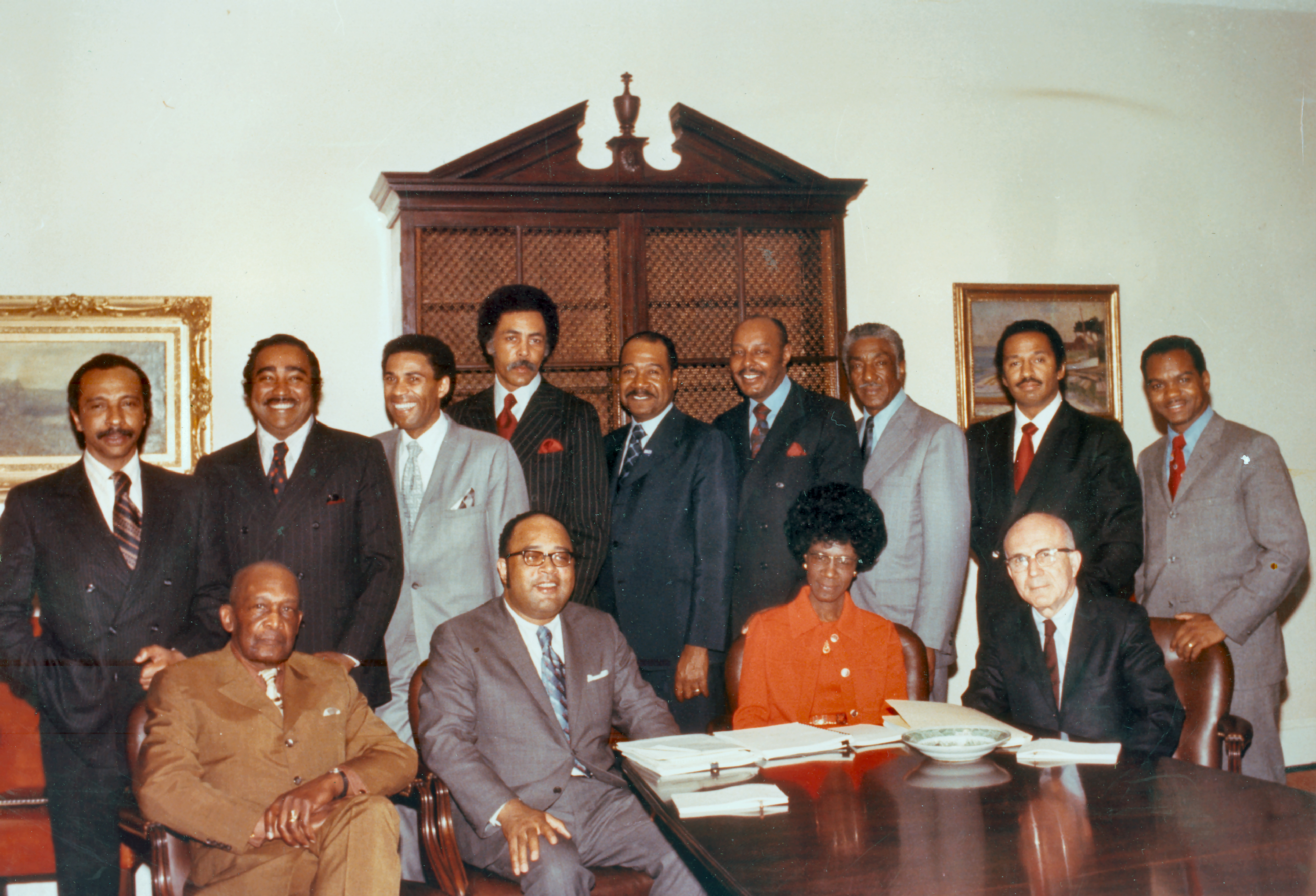
Dellums (standing, fourth from left) with fellow founding members of the Congressional Black Caucus in 1971

Dellums served as chairman of the House Committee on the District of Columbia and the House Armed Services Committee.

Dellums also served on the Foreign Affairs Committee, the Post Office and Civil Service Committee, the Permanent Select Committee on Intelligence, and the Select Committee to Investigate the Intelligence Community.

Dellums co-founded the Congressional Black Caucus in 1971 and co-founded the Congressional Progressive Caucus in 1991.

=== Dellums's last Congressional election ===
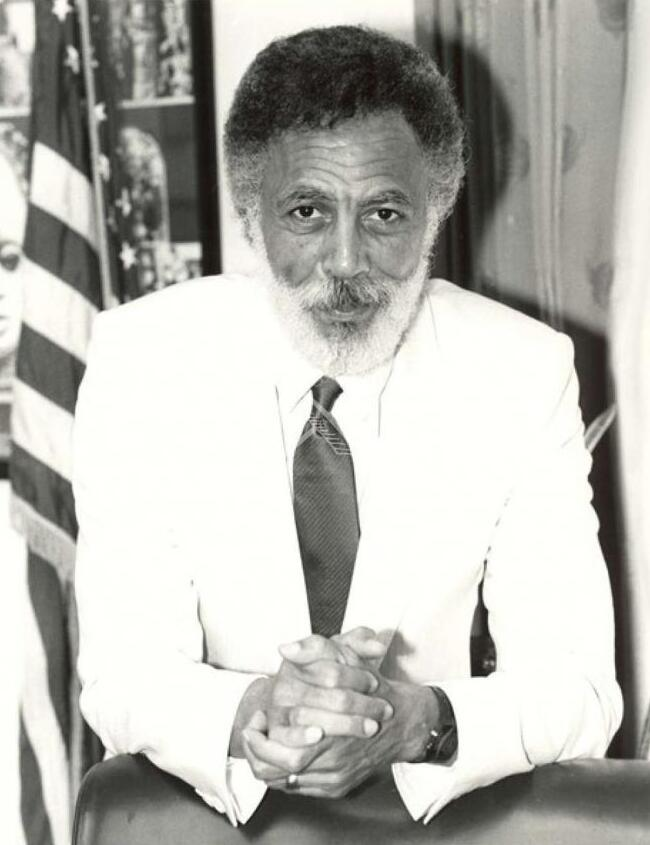
Dellums's official portrait in the 103rd Congress, 1993.

Dellums was reelected 11 times from this Oakland-based district, which changed numbers twice during his tenure–from the 7th (1971–75) to the 8th (1975–93) to the 9th (1993–98). He only dropped below 57 percent of the vote twice, in 1980 and 1982. In his last House election race, in 1996, Dellums bested his opponent, Republican Deborah Wright, by a 77%–18% margin.

In 1997, Dellums announced that he was retiring from Congress in the middle of his term, and his resignation forced a special election for the balance of his term–– which created a series of five special elections in 12 months as various East Bay politicians ran for different political offices.

Dellums's successor, Barbara Lee, won the 2000 election by an even larger, 85%–9% margin.

=== Congressional tribute ===
Upon his resignation, several members of Congress, including Nancy Pelosi, Jane Harman, William Coyne, Nick Rahall, Ike Skelton, Juanita Millender-McDonald, and Tom DeLay gave speeches on the floor of the House in honor of Dellums. Millender-McDonald described Dellums as a "distinguished, principled [and] educated man." Her tribute went on:

Congressman Ron Dellums is revered on both sides of this aisle because of his integrity and his commitment to progressive ideas. He was always on the cutting edge of the issues. California will miss him in the ninth district, but the State has been enriched by Ron Dellums. While he towers above most of us physically, this attribute is matched by his intellect, faith in the process and optimism for peaceful resolution of conflict.

Congressman Danny Davis of Illinois described Dellums:

A creative, piercing, probing, incisive, thought-provoking, inspiring, charismatic, careful, considerate and deliberative mind. The mind to stand up when others sit down. The mind to act when others refuse to act. The mind to stand even when you stand alone, battered, bruised and scorned, but still standing. Standing on principle, standing tall and standing for the people.

House Majority Leader Tom DeLay described Dellums as "...one of the most giving, open and stalwart, a real stalwart man when he was Chairman"

We are losing one of its finest Members, a Member that I have great respect for, because he always did his homework, was so articulate and eloquent on this floor.

He always got my attention when he stood up and took the microphone. He would stop every Member in their tracks to hear what he had to say, and there are very few Members that have served in this body that can claim the respect that both sides of the aisle had for the gentleman from California. And the incredible reputation that the gentleman from California has brought to this House; he has elevated this House. He has elevated the distinction of this House by serving here, and this House will greatly miss him when he leaves.

=== Voting record ===
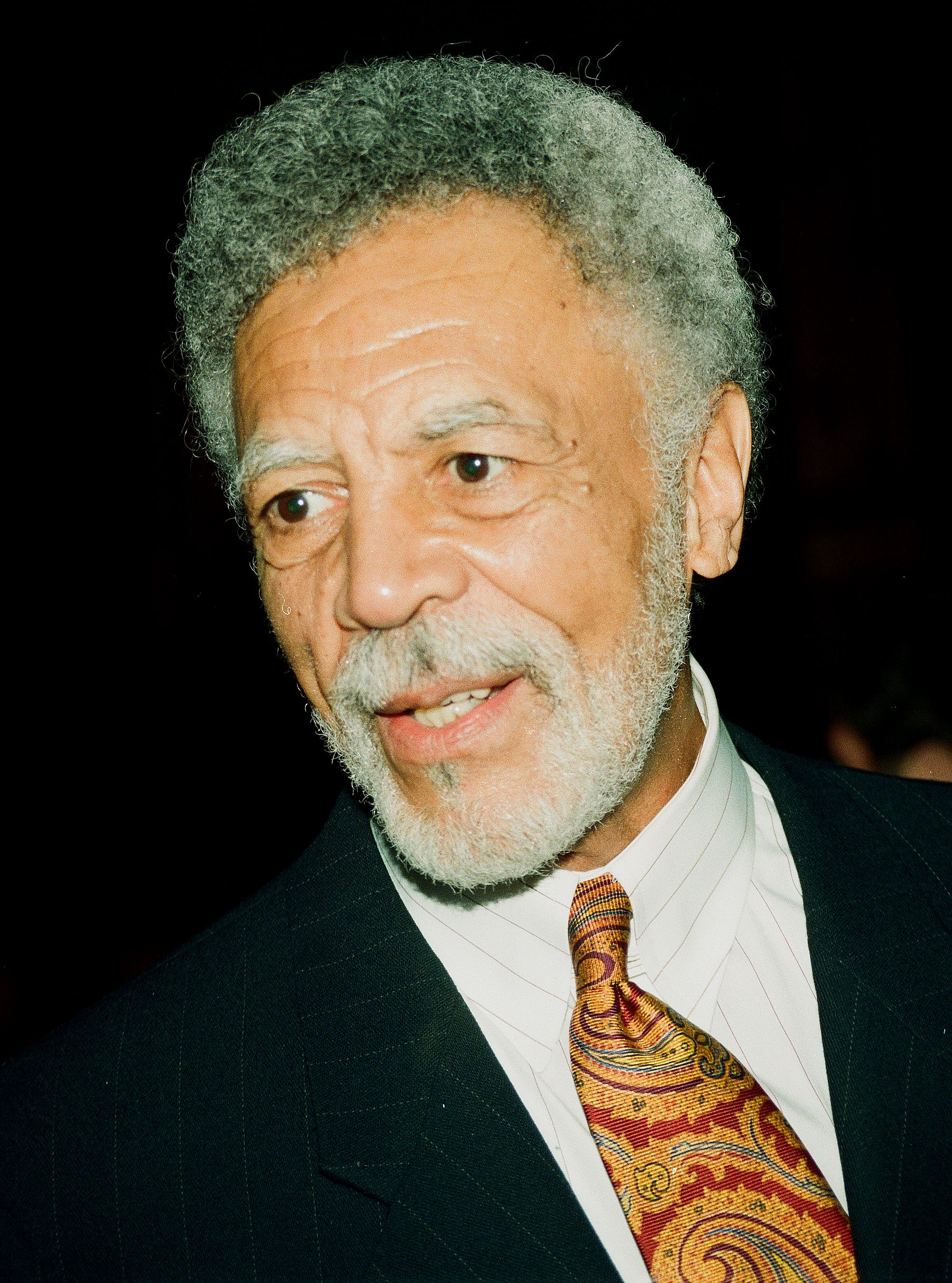
Dellums in 1996

Dellums's voting records in Congress were "almost without exception straight As" from groups such as the Sierra Club, the National Organization for Women and the AFL–CIO. He received 100% on consumer group Public Citizen's scorecard. In contrast, he received an "F" from NumbersUSA, a group dedicated to limiting immigration.

=== Dismissal of drug use allegations ===
An eight-month investigation cleared Dellums of allegations that he had used cocaine and marijuana, finding there was no basis for the allegations. The investigation of Dellums and two other congressmen, Texas Democrat Charlie Wilson and California Republican Barry Goldwater Jr., began in 1983, based on a complaint from a House doorkeeper, who pleaded guilty to drug charges on Capitol Hill himself in March 1983.

== Presidential nominations ==
In 1976, Dellums was nominated for president by the National Black Political Assembly but refused, stating "It is not my moment; it's not my time." That year, he received 20 delegate votes at the Democratic National Convention for the Vice-Presidency.

Four years later, he was again nominated as the presidential candidate, this time for the Independent Freedom Party, but refused the nomination because the IFP had not yet created an effective political structure. In that year's Democratic National Convention, Dellums received three delegate votes for the Presidential nomination.

== Lobbyist ==
Dellums worked as a legislative lobbyist, which drew criticism described in the East Bay Express, a local newspaper. Shortly after leaving office, Dellums began consulting for an international health-care company, Healthcare Management International, which invests in health insurance programs in developing countries.

Dellums worked in Washington, D.C., as a lobbyist for clients such as the East Bay Peralta Community College District and AC Transit, the public transit district charged with offering mass transit throughout the East Bay. Dellums's firm lobbied for Rolls-Royce, a company that manufactures aircraft engines. He also worked on behalf of the San Francisco International Airport during its attempts to build additional runway capacity, which has been vigorously opposed by environmental groups. His company was engaged in community relations work for the Lawrence Berkeley National Laboratory which conducts scientific research on behalf of the Department of Energy, and has long had a contentious relationship with its residential neighbors and the Berkeley city council. In addition he lobbied for Bristol-Myers Squibb, a multinational pharmaceutical corporation.

In 2017, Bill Browder testified before the Senate Judiciary Committee that representatives of Vladimir Putin had hired "Howard Schweitzer of Cozen O'Connor Public Strategies and former Congressman Ronald Dellums to lobby members of Congress on Capitol Hill to repeal the Magnitsky Act and to remove Sergei's name from the Global Magnitsky bill." The bill is named for the Russian lawyer who was murdered in prison for pursuing the corruption of Putin's allies. Dellums also worked with the Human Rights Accountability Global Initiative to oppose sanctions on Russia.

Dellums lobbied for the Haitian government in 2001–2002 and worked to support Jean-Bertrand Aristide, the first democratically elected, former President of Haiti who was deposed in a 2004 coup.

When running for mayor of Oakland, Dellums listed his most recent profession as "retired Congressman" in election filing forms. When assistant City Clerk Marjo Keller informed the Dellums campaign that this description was unacceptable, the campaign elected to leave the occupation field blank.

A former East Bay Express columnist once wrote a column titled "Dellums for Dollars" criticizing Dellums's lobbying. Speaking in defense of Dellums, Alameda County Supervisor Keith Carson said that, if asked, Dellums would likely say "just because I'm advocating for a company that may be paying me consulting fees, I'm not selling out my beliefs."

== Mayor of Oakland ==
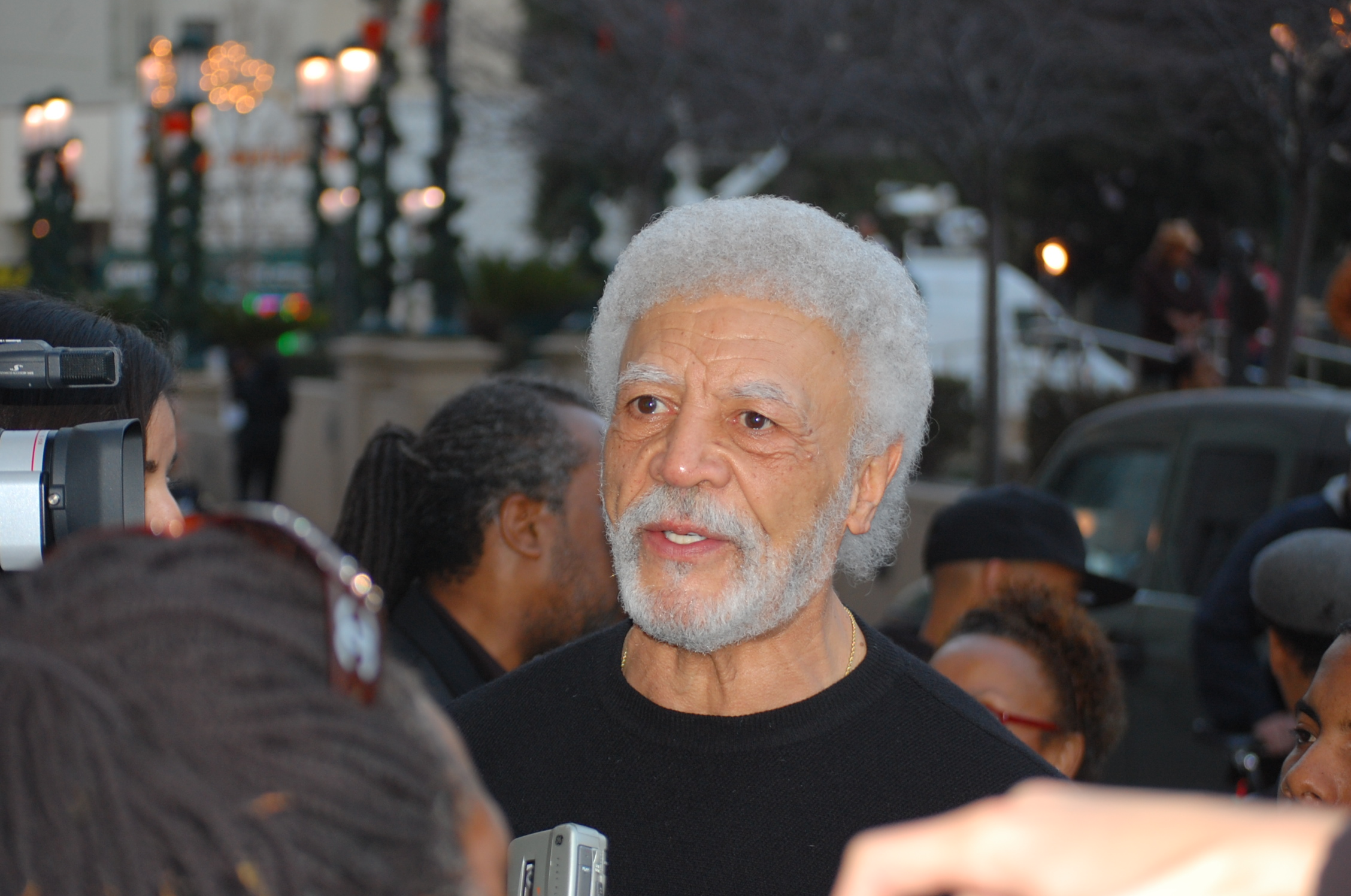
Dellums in 2009

=== 2006 Oakland mayoral election ===
After Oakland Council President Ignacio De La Fuente and District 3 City Council member Nancy Nadel declared their mayoral candidacies, Dellums was recruited to run for mayor of Oakland. An informal committee, "Draft Dellums", collected 8,000 signatures and presented them to the former Congressman at a public meeting at Laney College. Crowds of Oaklanders chanted "Run, Ron, Run".

In October 2005, reportedly after weeks of deliberation and speculation, Dellums announced that he would run for mayor of Oakland. The incumbent mayor, former California Governor Jerry Brown, was prohibited by term limits from running again.

On June 16, 2006, after a careful ballot count, and a dispute over whether votes for unqualified write-in candidates such as George W. Bush and Homer Simpson counted towards the total, Dellums was unofficially declared the winner in the Oakland mayoral race. Dellums garnered a 50.18 percent majority to win the election. This was 155 votes more than needed to avoid a runoff. Dellums received 41,992 votes, while his nearest challengers received 27,607 votes, and 10,928 votes respectively.

=== Transition and citizen task forces ===
Mayor-Elect Dellums's transition to office involved 800 Oaklanders who joined 41 task forces to make recommendations on issues ranging from public safety to education and affordable housing. Many of these recommendations helped to shape the policy agenda of the Dellums administration. The task forces recommended a land use policy which would emphasize zoning for job-creating business. This policy was adopted in 2007, and the city is being zoned. The task forces recommended a stronger policy on the hiring of local residents, and the City Council appointed a group to pursue this change. The task forces recommended a focus on the green economy, and the Mayor, along with a variety of community organizations created the Green Jobs Corps, an office of sustainability and the East Bay Green Corridor. Mayor Dellums reported that approximately two-thirds of the recommendations had been implemented as of the end of 2009. The Task Forces and the Inauguration itself, which included hundreds of the city's least affluent residents, were considered examples of grassroots democracy.

=== Public safety initiatives ===
Crime rates were high when Dellums took office in January 2007 and at his first State of the City Address in January 2008, Dellums called for hiring more police officers. Dellums promised that by year's end, the police department would be fully staffed at 803 officers. On November 14, 2008, 38 Oakland police officers were added to the force after graduating the 165th academy, bringing the department's force to 837 officers, the most in OPD history.

In addition, to follow through on his calls for hiring more officers, Dellums offered Measure NN on the November 2008 ballot, a voter initiative parcel tax to hire 70 additional police officers at a hiring and training cost of $250,000 each. Though 55 percent of Oakland voters supported Measure NN, this failed to meet California's "two thirds" constitutional requirement for the enactment of a new tax.

Dellums's administration negotiated the passage of a new police contract which was especially noteworthy, as it broke the Oakland Police Officers Association's opposition to the civilianization of certain OPD positions which were previously staffed by "sworn," uniformed police officers, with concomitant payrolls and police academy training costs. OPD then hired "non-sworn" personnel to work some of its desk jobs and administrative jobs, freeing up academy uniformed officers for street patrol and investigative work.

On March 21, 2009, during the 2009 Oakland police shootings incident, the Oakland Police Department lost three sergeants and one officer. One of the officers left instructions in his emergency packet that if he were killed in the line of duty that Dellums not be permitted to speak at his funeral. Two of the officers' families requested the same, and when Dellums attended the March 28 public memorial service at the Oracle Arena he honored the requests.

In his State of the City address in 2008 Dellums promised to reduce the crime rate by 10% during 2009; the crime rate actually went down by 13%.

In 2009 Dellums hired the highly regarded Anthony Batts, formerly the Long Beach police chief. Batts had a record of reducing both crime and police shootings in that Southern California city.

=== Education initiatives ===
Noting that reducing teacher turn-over and improving the engagement of teachers with the families of their students would require increasing the number of teachers who came from the local community, Dellums initiated a program to create more teachers who were diverse local residents. He held teacher recruitment summits in City Hall, helped the Teach Tomorrow in Oakland program to obtain $2.7 million in federal funding, and spoke to the U.S. Conference of Mayors about the national potential of such programs. The Community Task Forces remained active in these efforts.

In 2009 Dellums launched an anti-drop-out initiative which included sponsoring back to school rallies at City Hall and participating with the school district in truancy reduction efforts. He accepted an invitation from the national organization, America's Promise, to join their efforts at drop-out prevention. As part of this effort, he started Oakland's Promise, recruited several dozen community-based organizations to participate, held a Summit with 350 participants, and adopted an Action Plan to cut Oakland's drop-out rate in half.

=== Promoting Oakland ===
As mayor, Dellums proposed the idea of Oakland as a "Model City". He argued that Oakland is "big enough to be significant and small enough to get your arms around", and that the federal government needs a city like Oakland on which to try out new urban policy inventions.

From 2008, Dellums campaigned to bring millions in American Recovery and Reinvestment Act federal stimulus funding to Oakland, using both his extensive Washington D.C. contacts and the idea of the Model City. By the end of 2009, his efforts had yielded US$65 million in stimulus funding for Oakland, including the largest police grant of any city in the country, and the second largest amount in competitive funding after Chicago.

=== Criticism and recall efforts ===
After his election as mayor of Oakland, Dellums came under criticism for a wide range of issues, including a lack of transparency in government, ineffectual governance, and alleged extended absence from his duties at City Hall. He was criticized for refusing to disavow a staff-generated letter sent in his name in July 2007 to a Federal Bankruptcy Court in support of Your Black Muslim Bakery, whose owners were suspects in the 2007 murder of reporter Chauncey Bailey. In 2009, Dellums and his wife were cited with failure to pay over $239,000 in federal income taxes.

In 2007, Oakland reporter Elise Ackerman launched an unsuccessful campaign to recall Dellums and released an open letter addressed to Dellums. When addressing a town hall-style meeting in 2007, Dellums declared: "I'm giving it everything that I have. If that's not enough, that's cool. Recall me and let me get on with my private life."

Dellums later announced he would not seek a second term as mayor of Oakland in the 2010 election. He was succeeded by Jean Quan.

== Partisan affiliations ==
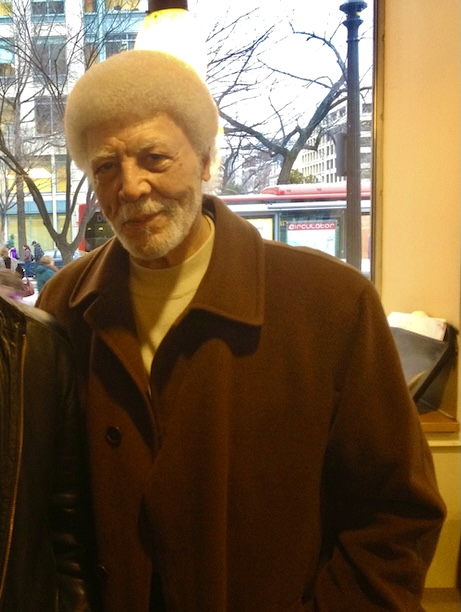
Dellums in Washington, DC for the United States Conference of Mayors annual meeting in 2013

Although he ran as a Democrat and caucused as a Democrat in Congress, Dellums described himself as a socialist. He was the first self-described socialist in Congress since Victor L. Berger. In the 1970s, Dellums was a member of the Democratic Socialist Organizing Committee (DSOC), an offshoot of the Socialist Party of America. He later became vice-chair of the Democratic Socialists of America (DSA), which was formed by a merger between the DSOC and the New American Movement, and which works within and outside the Democratic Party.

While running for mayor of Oakland, Dellums was officially registered as a member of the Democratic Party.

On October 1, 2007, Dellums endorsed Hillary Clinton in the 2008 Democratic presidential primary at a press conference held at Laney College in Oakland. He was named national chair of Clinton's Urban Policy Committee.

Dellums was a member of the ReFormers Caucus of Issue One.

== Autobiography ==
In 2000, Dellums published an autobiography, cowritten with H. Lee Halterman, entitled Lying Down with the Lions: A Public Life from the Streets of Oakland to the Halls of Power.

== Death ==
Dellums died of complications from prostate cancer on July 30, 2018, at age 82. He is interred with military honors in section 82, at Arlington National Cemetery.

== Electoral history ==
Ron Dellums electoral history

United States House of Representatives elections, 1970
Party	Candidate	Votes	%
Democratic	Ron Dellums	89,784	57.3
Republican	John E. Healy	64,691	41.3
Peace and Freedom	Sarah Scahill	2,156	1.4
Total votes		156,631	100
Turnout			
Democratic hold			

United States House of Representatives elections, 1972
Party	Candidate	Votes	%
Democratic	Ron Dellums (incumbent)	126,351	60
Republican	Peter Hannaford	85,851	38
American Independent	Frank V. Cortese	13,430	2
Total votes		225,632	100
Turnout			
Democratic hold			

United States House of Representatives elections, 1974
Party	Candidate	Votes	%
Democratic	Ron Dellums (Incumbent)	93,106	56.6%
Republican	Jack Redden	65,432	39.6%
American Independent	John Holland	6,324	3.8%
Total votes		164,862	100.0%
Democratic hold			

United States House of Representatives elections, 1976
Party	Candidate	Votes	%
Democratic	Ron Dellums (Incumbent)	122,342	62.1%
Republican	Philip Stiles Breck Jr.	68,374	34.7%
Peace and Freedom	Robert J. Evans	6,238	3.2%
Total votes		196,954	100.0%
Democratic hold			

United States House of Representatives elections, 1978
Party	Candidate	Votes	%
Democratic	Ron Dellums (Incumbent)	94,824	57.4%
Republican	Charles V. Hughes	70,481	42.6%
Total votes		165,305	100.0%
Democratic hold			

United States House of Representatives elections, 1980
Party	Candidate	Votes	%
Democratic	Ron Dellums (Incumbent)	108,380	55.5%
Republican	Charles V. Hughes	76,580	39.2%
Libertarian	Tod Mikuriya	10,465	5.4%
Total votes		195,425	100.0%
Democratic hold			

United States House of Representatives elections, 1982
Party	Candidate	Votes	%
Democratic	Ron Dellums (Incumbent)	121,537	55.9%
Republican	Claude B. Hutchinson Jr.	95,694	44.1%
Total votes		217,231	100.0%
Democratic hold			

United States House of Representatives elections, 1984
Party	Candidate	Votes	%
Democratic	Ron Dellums (Incumbent)	144,316	60.3%
Republican	Charles Connor	94,907	39.7%
Total votes		239,223	100.0%
Democratic hold			

United States House of Representatives elections, 1986
Party	Candidate	Votes	%
Democratic	Ron Dellums (Incumbent)	121,790	60.0%
Republican	Steven Eigenberg	76,850	37.9%
Peace and Freedom	Lawrence R. Manuel	4,295	2.1%
Total votes		202,935	100.0%
Democratic hold			

United States House of Representatives elections, 1988
Party	Candidate	Votes	%
Democratic	Ron Dellums (Incumbent)	163,221	66.6%
Republican	John J. Cuddihy Jr.	76,531	31.2%
Peace and Freedom	Tom Condit	5,444	2.2%
Total votes		245,196	100.0%
Democratic hold			

United States House of Representatives elections, 1990
Party	Candidate	Votes	%
Democratic	Ron Dellums (Incumbent)	119,645	61.3%
Republican	Barbara Galewski	75,544	38.7%
Total votes		195,189	100.0%
Democratic hold			

United States House of Representatives elections, 1992
Party	Candidate	Votes	%
Democratic	Ron Dellums (incumbent)	164,265	71.9
Republican	G. William "Billy" Hunter	53,707	23.5
Peace and Freedom	Dave Linn	10,472	4.6
No party	Muss (write-in)	23	0.0
Total votes		228,467	100.0
Turnout			
Democratic hold			

United States House of Representatives elections, 1994
Party	Candidate	Votes	%
Democratic	Ron Dellums (incumbent)	129,233	72.25
Republican	Deborah Wright	40,448	22.61
Peace and Freedom	Emma Wong Mar	9,194	5.14
Total votes		178,875	100.0
Turnout			
Democratic hold			

United States House of Representatives elections, 1996
Party	Candidate	Votes	%
Democratic	Ron Dellums (incumbent)	154,806	77.1
Republican	Deborah Wright	37,126	18.5
Peace and Freedom	Tom Condit	5,561	2.7
Natural Law	Jack Forem	3,475	1.7
Republican	Omari Musa (write-in)	8	0.0
Total votes		200,976	100.0
Turnout			
Democratic hold			

2006 Mayoral election, City of Oakland, CA
Candidate	Votes	%
Ronald V. "Ron" Dellums	42,073	50.2
Ignacio De La Fuente	27,647	33.0
Nancy J. Nadel	10,949	13.1
Ron "Oz" Oznowicz	1,834	2.2
Arnie L. Fields	857	1.0
Hector "Reno" Reyna	348	0.4
Write-in votes	122	0.1

== See also ==
- List of African-American United States representatives
- List of Democratic Socialists of America who have held office in the United States
- The Color of Friendship

U.S. House of Representatives
Preceded by Jeffery Cohelan	Member of the U.S. House of Representatives from California's 7th congressional district 1971–1975	Succeeded by George Miller
Preceded by Pete Stark	Member of the U.S. House of Representatives from California's 8th congressional district 1975–1993	Succeeded by Nancy Pelosi
Preceded by Charles Diggs	Chair of the House District of Columbia Committee; 1979–1993	Succeeded by Pete Stark
Preceded by Mervyn M. Dymally	Chair of the Congressional Black Caucus; 1989–1991	Succeeded by Edolphus Towns
Preceded by Pete Stark	Member of the U.S. House of Representatives from California's 9th congressional district 1993–1998	Succeeded by Barbara Lee
Preceded by Les Aspin	Chair of the House Armed Services Committee; 1993–1995	Succeeded by Floyd Spence
Preceded by Floyd Spence	Ranking Member of the House Armed Services Committee; 1995–1998	Succeeded by Ike Skelton
Political offices
Preceded by Jerry Brown	Mayor of Oakland; 2007–2011	Succeeded by Jean Quan
