= Noel Gallo =

American politician

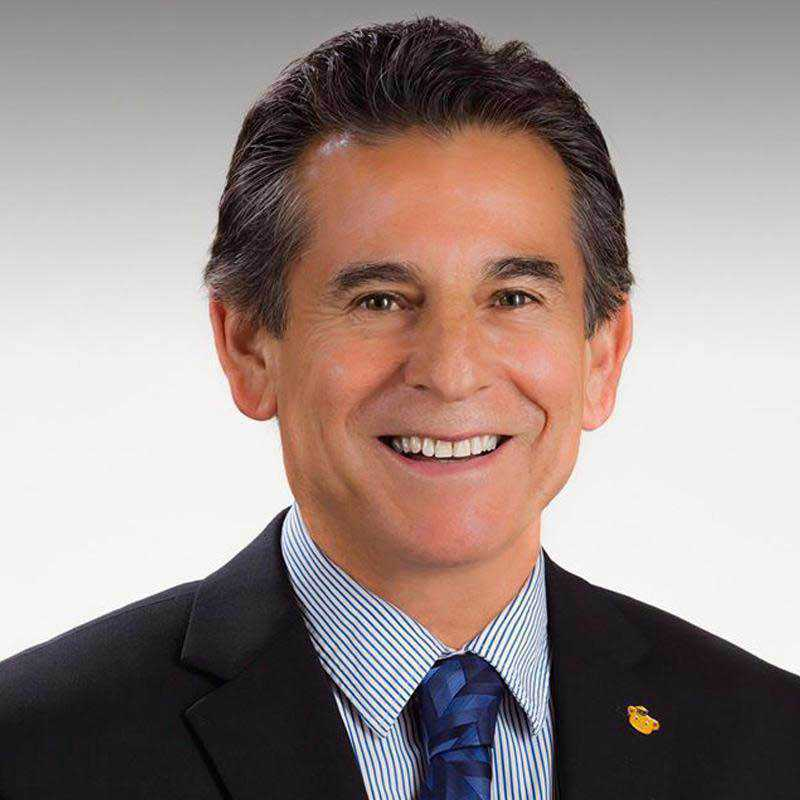

Member of the Oakland City Council from District 5
- Incumbent
- Assumed office 2013
- Preceded by: Ignacio de la Fuente

Member of the Oakland Board of Education from District 5
- In office January 1993 – 2012
- Preceded by: Darlene Lawson
- Succeeded by: Roseann Torres

Personal details
- Born: Ysleta, El Paso, Texas
- Party: Democratic
- Education: University of California, Berkeley (BS)
- Website: Government website

Noel Gallo represents District 5 on the Oakland City Council, a position he has held since 2013. Gallo is chair of the public safety committee, where he has advocated for youth curfews and the creation of a Public Safety Oversight Commission. In 2021, Gallo voted to redirect $17.4 million of a $27 million budget increase from the Oakland Police Department to the Department of Violence Prevention.

In 1992 he was the first Hispanic elected to the Oakland School Board on which he also served as President.

Gallo grew up in the Fruitvale district, which he now represents.
