= The Color of Friendship =

American television film

- VHS cover
- Written by: Paris Qualles
- Directed by: Kevin Hooks
- Starring: Carl Lumbly; Penny Johnson; Lindsey Haun; Shadia Simmons
- Theme music composer: Stanley Clarke
- Countries of origin: United States; Canada
- Original language: English

Production
- Executive producer: Alan Sacks
- Producers: Kevin Hooks; Christopher Morgan
- Cinematography: David Herrington
- Editor: Richard Nord
- Running time: 87 minutes
- Production company: Alan Sacks Productions

Original release
- Network: Disney Channel
- Release: February 5, 2000

The Color of Friendship is a 2000 biographical drama television film based on actual events about the friendship between two girls (Piper and Mahree), one from the United States and the other from apartheid South Africa, who learn about tolerance and racism. The film was directed by Kevin Hooks, based on a script by Paris Qualles, and stars Lindsey Haun and Shadia Simmons.

== Plot ==
In 1977, Piper Dellums is a Black girl who lives in Washington, D.C. with her father, Congressman Ron Dellums, an outspoken opponent of the South African apartheid system, her mother Roscoe Dellums, and two younger twin brothers, Brandon and Erik. Piper, who has been taking an interest in the different nations of Africa, begs her parents to host an African exchange student.

Meanwhile, in Dundee, South Africa, Mahree Bok is a White South African who lives in a manor house with her parents and little brother Rian. They comfortably benefit from the system of apartheid without questioning its morality; Mahree's father, Pieter Bok, is a South African policeman who cannot hide his joy when Stephen Biko (a Black South African man fighting against apartheid) has just been captured. They also have a Black maid, Flora, whom Mahree considers her best friend, not realizing that Flora is not satisfied with her life under apartheid. Flora is a kindly woman who is friendly with the Bok children. Flora tells Mahree that when she was a little girl she would observe the weaver bird, which has many different styles of plumage, and its communal nest-building, which is used as a metaphor for the possibility of racial harmony that Mahree does not understand at the time. Mahree also asks her parents for permission to study in America, which is granted by her father, who believes she will either get homesick or realize that America is not a paradise.

Upon meeting each other, both Mahree and Piper have ill-informed ideas about each other's countries: Mahree does not believe that there are Black politicians, only knowing that the patriarch of her host family is "Congressman Dellums." While Piper is expecting a South African exchange student, she has not considered the possibility that the student would be a White African. Mahree reacts with horror bordering on panic when confronted with this new situation, and locks herself in Piper's bedroom when she is brought to the Dellums' home. Eventually, Piper picks the lock on the door to bring Mahree some fries and a chocolate shake. Mahree is standoffish, and Piper, upset by her attitude, tells Mahree how disappointed she is in her. Stunned by this, Mahree sees how rude she's been, and agrees to stay. Roscoe, who decides to play peacemaker, chalks up Mahree's reaction as a misunderstanding and culture shock, while telling Ron and Piper that they have been judgmental as well.

During Mahree's stay, she and the Dellums family grow close. Mahree sees people of different races getting along and realizes how much she and Piper have in common. The two become good friends; Mahree begins to see her host family as individuals and learns to live among them day to day. Gradually, she develops a better understanding of what life under apartheid must be like for Black South Africans.

When Stephen Biko dies under suspicious circumstances in the custody of the South African police, there are mass protests around the world, including at the South African embassy. In the wake of these protests, South African diplomats arrive at the Dellumses' house and take Mahree to the embassy, intending to send her back to South Africa. In response, Ron goes to the South African embassy and threatens to tell the press that the diplomats kidnapped Mahree from her host family. The embassy releases Mahree and she returns to the Dellumses' house without fully understanding what happened to her and why. During a discussion with Piper, she makes a cold offhand comment about Biko's death. Outraged, Piper tells her off for being blind to the injustice of apartheid in South Africa. Hurt, Mahree runs outside, but Ron follows her. He tells Mahree that the United States had a long, hard history of trying to overcome problems, which is what South Africa is doing now, and she finally fully grasps what the liberation fighters in South Africa stand for. She reconciles with Piper.

An epilogue-like scene at the end of the movie shows Mahree with the Dellumses at an African pride event in America. Ron delivers a speech that includes the weaverbird story, as told to him by "a new friend from South Africa."

Mahree leaves the United States, now a very different person. When she returns home, the first person she greets is Flora. Secretly, Mahree shows her an ANC flag sewn inside her coat, signifying her decision to side with the Black liberation movement. Flora is touched and pleased. Mahree then releases the weaver bird.

== Cast ==
- Shadia Simmons as Piper Dellums
- Lindsey Haun as Mahree Bok
- Carl Lumbly as Congressman Ron Dellums
- Penny Johnson as Roscoe Dellums
- Anthony Burnett as Brandy Dellums
- Travis Davis as Erik Dellums
- Melanie Nicholls-King as Flora
- Susan Danford as Merle Bok
- Stephen Jennings as Pieter Bok
- Michael Kanev as Rian Bok
- Ahmad Stoner as Daniel
- Ryan Cooley as Billy
- Erik Dellums as Oliver

== Production ==
The Color of Friendship was written by Paris Qualles and directed by Kevin Hooks. The film is based on two separate instances in which the Dellums family hosted a white South African teenage girl as an exchange student. Both instances were combined into a single story for the film. Filming took place in Canada, and was underway in Toronto during September 1999. The film's production designer was Arthur W. Herriot.

== Release ==
The Color of Friendship premiered on Disney Channel on February 5, 2000, during Black History Month. The film was released on VHS on January 8, 2002.

== Reception ==
Lynne Heffley of the Los Angeles Times praised the cast and called the film "surprisingly compelling", and stated that while it is "frequently predictable", it "delves unexpectedly deeper, too." David Kronke of the Los Angeles Daily News noted that the film did an "admirably handy job" of educating children about apartheid, and called it a "thoughtful, entertaining family film that tackles its issues matter-of-factly and directly". Ramin Zahed of Variety praised the cast and noted the "smart usage of '70s songs" as well as Herriot's "picture-perfect production design."

Scott Hetrick of the Sun-Sentinel called the film "entertaining and enlightening," stating that it had a "terrific story that is wonderfully told and thoroughly fulfilling." The Seattle Times wrote that the film "breaks the nauseatingly simple 'after-school special' mold of most child-friendly teleflicks" and that it "is certainly one of the better films you'll see on the channel". Paul Schultz of New York Daily News wrote that the film "grapples with apartheid head on, yet incorporates it into an engrossing, and touching, family story." Schultz further wrote that the "changes of heart" between Mahree and the Dellums family are "most affecting" and that the "story and the human dynamics here are so inherently dramatic that the heartfelt script seems to write itself. The performances are wonderful, and when politics arise it seems natural."

In June 2011, Stephan Lee of Entertainment Weekly wrote that the film "rocked!" In 2012, Complex ranked the film at number 10 on the magazine's list of the 25 best Disney Channel Original Movies (DCOMs). In May 2016, Aubrey Page of Collider ranked each DCOM released up to that point, placing The Color of Friendship at number 15. Page stated, "It's totally fair that The Color of Friendship is one of the most lauded installments in the Disney franchise," writing that the film features a "comparatively unflinching look at race relations" and that it "scores extra points for refusing to shy away from the more difficult sides of racism, making sure to drive home the harsh realities of racially-motivated violence." That month, Ariana Bacle of Entertainment Weekly wrote that Disney Channel "took a risk by unapologetically making a completely necessary albeit heavy statement about prejudice with one of their kid-focused films, and it was well worth it."

=== Awards ===
- 2000 Emmy Award for Outstanding Children's Program (won)
- 2000 Humanitas Prize (won)
- 2001 NAACP Image Award: Outstanding Comedy Series/Special (won)
- 2001 WGA Award: Children's Script Category, Paris Qualles (won)
- 2001 Young Artist Awards: Best Performance in a TV Movie (Drama) - Leading Young Actress, Shadia Simmons (won)
- 2001 Young Artist Awards: Best Performance in a TV Movie (Drama) - Leading Young Actress, Lindsey Haun (nominated)
- 2001 Young Artist Awards: Best Family TV Movie/Pilot/Mini-Series - Cable (nominated)
- 2001 DGA Award: Outstanding Directorial Achievement in Children's Programs, Kevin Hooks (nominated)

== See also ==
- Cry, the Beloved Country
- Nelson Mandela
- 2000 in television
