= Piper Dellums =

American author and public speaker

Piper Dellums is an American author and public speaker. She is the daughter of former U.S. Congressman and Oakland mayor Ron Dellums.

== Early life and education ==
Piper Dellums is the daughter of former U.S. Congressman and Oakland mayor Ron Dellums, and the sister of actor Erik Dellums.

Dellums is a graduate of the University of California, Berkeley, where she studied psychology, biology, and theater. She also earned a graduate degree in drama therapy with an emphasis in biochemistry at New York University.

== Career ==
Dellums' story about a white South African girl coming to live with her family in the 1970s, titled "Simunye", was the basis for the Emmy Award-winning Disney movie The Color of Friendship (2000). The role of Dellums was played by Shadia Simmons.

== Other activities ==
Dellums travels throughout America speaking at conferences and workshops about her humanitarian work.

== Personal life ==
Dellums has two daughters.
