= Ignacio De La Fuente =

American politician

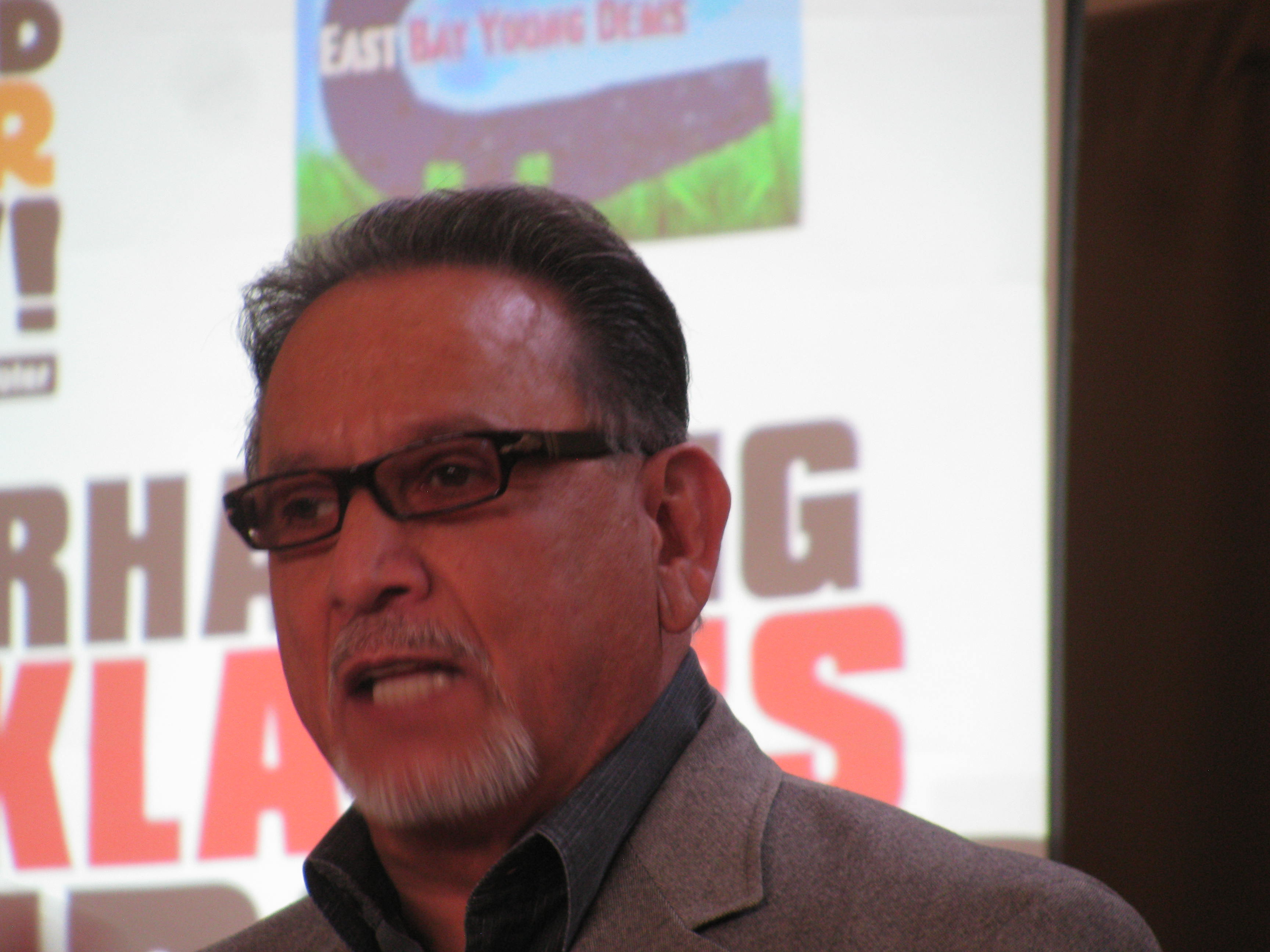

Member of the Oakland City Council from District 5
- In office 1992–2013
- Succeeded by: Noel Gallo

Vice Mayor
- In office 2009–2011
- Succeeded by: Desley Brooks

Personal details
- Born: January 1, 1949 (age 77) Mexico City, Mexico
- Party: Democratic
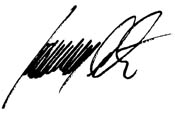
- Signature

Ignacio De La Fuente (born January 1, 1949) is a former Oakland City Councilmember. He was also the President of Oakland's City Council until January 2009, when he became vice mayor of Oakland. De La Fuente was an unsuccessful candidate for mayor of Oakland in 1998, 2006, and 2022.

== Background ==
De La Fuente was born in Mexico City, immigrated to California at the age of 21, and subsequently became an American citizen. De La Fuente settled in Oakland, California and began working in a foundry as a machinist.

== Trade union representative ==
In 1977 he was elected as a union representative of Phoenix Iron Works. Today De La Fuente serves as an International Vice President for the Glass, Molders, Pottery, Plastics, and Allied Workers International Union, AFL-CIO, where he negotiates for members through the collective bargaining process.

== Oakland City Council ==
De La Fuente, circa 2003

First elected to the Oakland City Council in 1992, he served as the chair of the council's Economic and Community Development Committee until January 1999. When Oakland adopted the Strong-Mayor form of government, that removed the Mayor from the City Council and created the position of Council President. De La Fuente became the first Council member to be elected by his peers to serve as President of the Oakland City Council in 1999. He has been re-elected to this position every two years since then.

=== Opposition to medical marijuana movement ===
De La Fuente, circa 2003

In 1998, when the Oakland City Council deputized the Oakland Cannabis Buyer's Cooperative to distribute medical marijuana, De La Fuente cast a negative vote, saying that he could not support such efforts in "good conscience," citing concerns over abuse as well as control, certification, and monitoring of caregivers. De La Fuente supported efforts in 2003 to shutter all of Oakland's dispensaries but one, contending that "at least half of the clubs (were) selling pot for recreational use."

== 2006 mayoral campaign ==
De La Fuente ran unsuccessfully for Mayor of Oakland in 2006, placing second of three major candidates, behind the winner (former Congressman Ron Dellums) but ahead of challenger Nancy Nadel. On June 16, 2006, after a careful ballot recount, and a dispute over whether votes for unqualified write-in candidates such as George W. Bush and Homer Simpson counted towards the total, Dellums was declared the winner in the Oakland mayoral race. Dellums garnered the 50.18 percent majority he needed to win the election This was 155 votes more than needed to avoid a runoff. Dellums received 41,992 votes, while De La Fuente received 27,607 votes, and Nadel 10,928 votes.

== 2012 at-large city council campaign ==
In 2012 De La Fuente challenged Rebecca Kaplan for the at-large set on the Oakland City Council, leaving open the district 5 seat. De La Fuente lost to Kaplan, while Noel Gallo won the district 5 race to succeed De La Fuente. De La Fuente made false statements during his campaign.

== 2022 Oakland mayoral campaign ==
De La Fuente ran for Mayor of Oakland in the 2022 Oakland mayoral election. He ran on a "back to basics" slogan. His campaign has received most of its funding from coal lobbyists. Other candidates have signed a pledge not to take lobbying money from the coal industry. De La Fuente lost; only receiving about 10% of the vote.

== Oakland-Alameda County Coliseum Authority ==
In January 2017 De La Fuente was appointed to the Oakland-Alameda County Coliseum Authority board.

== Personal life ==
De La Fuente lives in Oakland.

On October 26, 2007, the councilman's son, Ignacio De La Fuente Jr., was sentenced to fourteen years in prison for the rape of three women, and a 15-year-old girl. The councilman maintains his son's innocence, and claims there was a "conspiracy" within the Oakland Police Department to target his son, and publicize the charges, for the purpose of embarrassing the elder De La Fuente during his unsuccessful 2006 mayoral bid. His son pleaded guilty and admitted to the sexual assaults.

On December 23, 2010, De La Fuente was arrested for speeding and DUI. A California Highway Patrol officer alleged to have observed De La Fuente speeding around 80 miles per hour (130 km/h) and making unsafe lane changes while driving his 2006 Buick on the Nimitz Freeway, I-880, near the Fruitvale Avenue exit in East Oakland. A CHP spokesperson alleges that, after being stopped, De La Fuente was noticeably impaired and failed field sobriety and driver coordination tests. He was booked into the North County jail in Downtown Oakland before being released the same evening to the custody of his wife, Elvia. De La Fuente failed a sobriety test and driver coordination tests. Prosecutors, citing a lack of evidence, mainly lack of a blood test to prove his blood alcohol level, declined to seek DUI charges against De La Fuente.
