= Nancy Nadel =

American politician

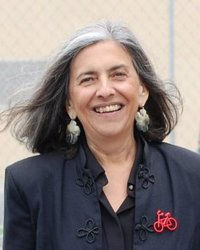

Member of the Oakland City Council from District 3
- In office 1996–2012
- Succeeded by: Lynette Gibson McElhaney

Nancy Nadel is a U.S. politician, businesswoman, and former four-term member of the Oakland City Council. After two terms on the Board of the East Bay Municipal Utility District, Nadel was elected to the District Three Downtown-West Oakland City Council seat in 1996. In 2006, Nadel ran unsuccessfully for Mayor. In 2008, Nadel was re-elected to her fourth consecutive term on Oakland's City Council in a contentious race with two other candidates. She retired from the Oakland City Council in 2012; her seat is currently held by Lynette Gibson McElhaney. Nadel is the founder of a chocolate business.

== Background ==
Nadel graduated from Alfred University in 1966 with a Bachelor of Fine Arts, from San Francisco State University in 1979 with a Bachelor of Science in Geology, and from University of California, Berkeley in 1981 with a Master of Science in Engineering geoscience. Prior to joining the Council, she was a teacher, an artist, a geophysicist, an oil and gas industry scientist,, a small business owner and an environmental engineer with the U.S. E.P.A. Her writings on water policy, affirmative action, environmental justice and sustainable development have been published in journals and periodicals.

== EBMUD and ABAG ==
Nadel began her political career on the board of directors of the East Bay Municipal Utility District, where she served two terms.

She is a member of the Association of Bay Area Governments (ABAG) executive committee, ABAG regional planning committee, and chairs the ABAG earthquake hazards outreach review committee.

== Oakland City Council ==
Nadel was elected to Oakland's District Three "Downtown-West Oakland" City Council seat in 1996. The district includes Adams Point, most of Oakland's Central Business District (CBD) including all of Downtown and the Lakeside Apartments District, but excluding the Civic Center district south of 14th Street, and Chinatown. District Three also includes Jack London Square, the Jack London District, Pill Hill, and West Oakland.

Nadel chaired the city council's public works committee.

=== 2008 city council election ===
On Tuesday June 3, 2008, in the 2008 District 3 city council election, Nadel was re-elected for her fourth consecutive term with 51.6% of the vote, narrowly avoiding a run-off election. Her two challengers, both West Oakland residents as is Nadel, were Sean Sullivan, Oakland Covenant House director, who finished with 27%, and Oakland attorney Greg Hodge, who was elected to the Oakland School Board in 2000 and 2004, who garnered 20% of the vote. Community building coordinator Africa Williams ran as a write-in candidate.

During the election, Nadel was the subject of ballot access controversy after one of her opponents, Greg Hodge, filed for ballot access with what a judge would later rule to be the required signatures. On March 14, 2008, two Nadel supporters, one of whom is an Oakland Attorney who made a contribution to Nadel's campaign on March 7, inspected the signatures on Hodge's petition to access the ballot. They scrutinized the address of one of the voters who signed the petition, which led to the City Clerk reversing her decision. Nadel maintains she played no role in striking Hodge's name from the ballot Hodge ended up filing suit for successful reinstatement to the ballot.

=== Policy initiatives ===
==== 2009 ballot measure ====
She favored a US$45 parcel tax, however she would like to spend 45% of it on arts and culture programs to the detriment of the Oakland Zoo, Chabot Space and Science Center, and Oakland Museum of California.

==== 2009 youth curfew proposal ====
She was opposed to a proposal for a youth curfew to keep child prostitutes off the streets, claiming increased contact with the police will be traumatic for them and that instead increased youth services and activities would be of better use. This explanation was decried as "absurd" since other council members said it was "ridiculous" to expect youth centers to be open at 2 or 3 AM and that there was no good reason for minors to be out that late at night. The curfew would have allowed police to take minors to their guardians or to a reception center with counseling services between the hours of 10PM (11PM Friday and Saturday) and 5AM.

==== Anti-cronyism ====
During the context of the 2008 Anti-Nepotism ordinance, Nadel wanted the ordinance to go beyond nepotism to include "cronyism" or any questionable relationship involving city workers. "I personally know about cronyism things that have occurred so I have no problem putting that in. The cronyism and nepotism is legendary and it goes back for 30 years."

After initially opposing an earlier version of the anti-nepotism ordinance along with fellow Councilmember Jane Brunner, which died in the Finance and Management Agency Committee in September 2008, a revised version of the ordinance proposal passed the full Council on November 18, 2008 on a 6-0 vote with the cronyism amendment attached.

==== West Oakland Youth Center ====
In 2008, Nadel attempted to unilaterally approve her pet project, the West Oakland Youth Center, which was finally built for a cost of 8 million dollars and remained empty in 2013 due to the inability to produce operational funds.

==== Staff ====
Nadel's official City Council staff of three full-time public servants included a scheduler, a constituent liaison, and a policy aide.

==== Constituent outreach ====
For several years, Nadel scheduled monthly "Constituent Coffee Hours" at World Ground Cafe in the Jack London District. In the fall of 2008, Nadel ended these open monthly meetings, preferring instead to meet directly with the Board of the Jack London District Association (JLDA), a neighborhood association. Her last Coffee Hours was scheduled for Saturday, October 25, 2008.

== 2006 Mayoral campaign ==
Nadel ran unsuccessfully for Mayor of Oakland in 2006, placing third of six candidates, behind City Council President Ignacio De La Fuente who finished in second place behind the winner, former mayor Ron Dellums.

== Businesswoman ==
Nadel is the founder of a locally operated chocolate-making business and sources the company's cocoa beans from Jamaica.

== Personal life ==
A West Oakland resident, Nadel is the widow of Chappell Hayes, and mother of an adult daughter. She is Jewish.
