= Oakland Charter Academy =

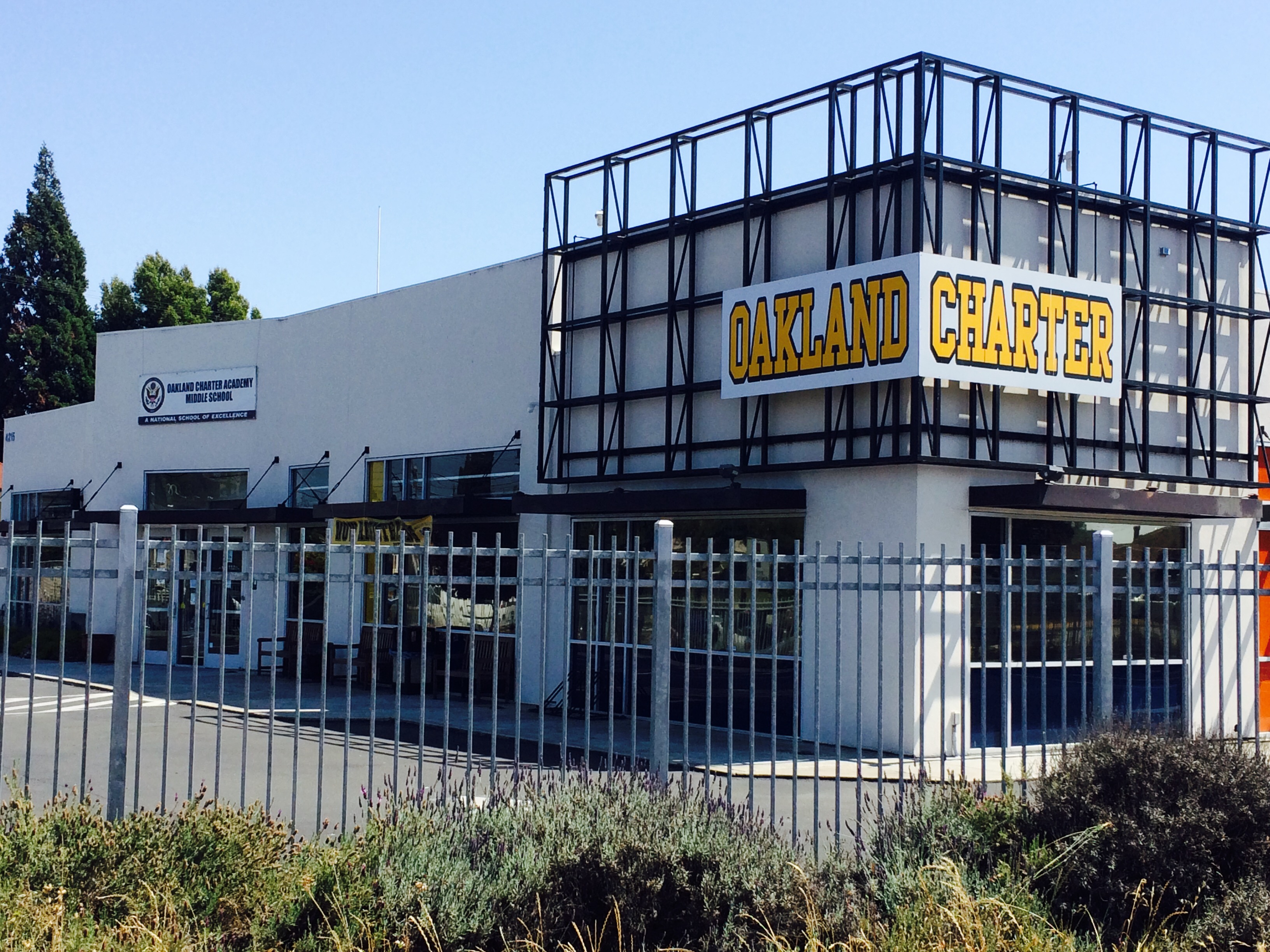
- Oakland Charter Academy campus.

Location
- 4215 Foothill Boulevard; Oakland, California; United States
- Coordinates: 37.775138°N 122.213148°W

Information
- Type: Charter
- Motto: Honor Hard Work
- Established: 1994
- School district: Amethod Public Schools
- NCES School ID: 062805002893
- Principal: Philip Ellingberg
- Grades: 6 to 8
- Enrollment: 235 (2018-19)
- Color: Black/Blue
- Mascot: Panther
- Website: OCA website

Oakland Charter Academy (OCA) originally Jingletown Charter School, is a charter school in Oakland, California serving middle school students. Opened in 1994, it is the first and oldest charter school in Oakland and one of the first in California. After a dramatic turnaround, it became the second public school in Oakland to win the National Blue Ribbon award. The school was also given the Hart Vision Charter School of the Year Award for 2009 by the California Charter Schools Association. The Amethod Public Schools system grew out of Oakland Charter Academy, and now includes Oakland Charter High School and Downtown Charter Academy located in downtown Oakland. The system also operates Benito Juarez Elementary School, Richmond Charter Academy and John Henry High School in Richmond.

Oakland Charter Academy was first housed at 30th Avenue and International Boulevard in Fruitvale, a section of Oakland that is predominantly Hispanic/Latino. It is now located on the corner of Foothill Blvd and 42nd Avenue.

== History ==
In the fall 1993 the school opened as Jingletown Charter School. It was the first charter school in Oakland and one of the first in California. Originally it had the test scores amongst the lowest in the state. In 2004, Jorge Lopez took control of the school. At the time, its Academic Performance Index (API) was 650. Lopez received guidance from Ben Chavis, head of the American Indian Model Schools, and established a system similar to the system of American Indian Public Charter School. In late September 2007, Oakland Charter Academy became the second public school in Oakland to win the National Blue Ribbon award. In spring 2008, the Oakland Charter Academy received an API of 902. Its student body was mostly Hispanic, and the API was over 200 points higher than the average API of Hispanic/Latino middle school students in California. The Oakland Charter Academy API was also over 200 points above the overall scores of all of the middle schools in Oakland.

== Operations ==
At Oakland Charter Academy every student received 70 (2019) minutes each of English and mathematics instructions. The day starts off with 30 minutes (Advisory) . In total there is 5 periods not including lunch. The classes included are Math, Science, English, P.E, and History. Furthermore, there is also art which students have once a week. The school requires its students to attend summer school. Katy Murphy of the Oakland Tribune said the work only intensifies during so-called school holidays." The school operates a tutoring and after-school program aimed at improving student performance. When the school first operated, the instructional language used in over half of the school day was Spanish. Currently, most of its students are Hispanic/Latino but the school also serves white, African-American, Asian-American and Arab-American students.
