= Fruitvale, Oakland, California =

Fruitvale
- Neighborhood of Oakland
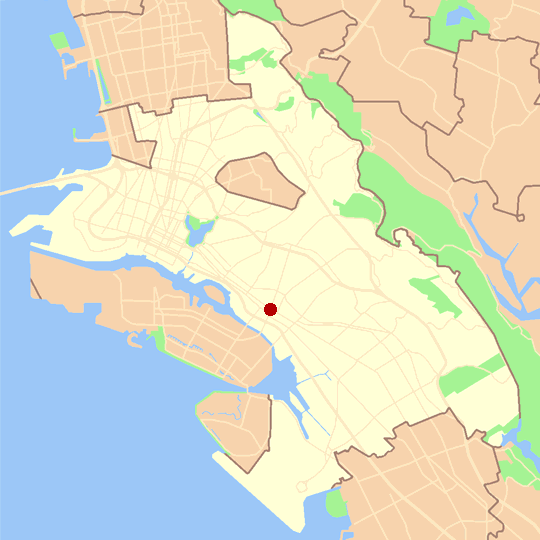
- Location of Fruitvale in Oakland
- Coordinates: 37.779722°N 122.220278°W
- Country: United States
- State: California
- County: Alameda
- City: Oakland

Population
  - Total: 50,294
- ZIP Code: 94601

Fruitvale (originally Fruit Vale and formerly Brays) is a neighborhood in Oakland, California, United States. It is located approximately 4 miles (6.44 km) southeast of Downtown, and is home to the city's largest Hispanic community, with Hispanics constituting 53.8% of Fruitvale's population. Fruitvale's ZIP code is 94601. It lies at an elevation of 49 feet (15 m).

The area got its name from the earlier "Fruit Vale", the fruit tree nursery (mostly apricots and cherries) established there by Henderson Luelling in the mid-19th century. After the 1906 earthquake, the influx of refugees from San Francisco caused a population boom, and the unincorporated neighborhood was annexed into the city of Oakland by 1909.

The Fruitvale shopping district is located along International Blvd. (formerly East 14th Street until 1995), from Fruitvale Avenue to 38th Avenue, and is one of the major commercial areas of the city. The area is home to many Latino businesses and hosts several annual cultural events, including a Cinco de Mayo parade and a Día De Los Muertos festival, which began in 1996 on International Blvd. Before the 1970s, the area had the Montgomery Ward West Coast distribution center and retail store located on the downtown Oakland side, roughly opposite East Oakland Hospital, both on East 14th Street. On the San Leandro side, to the south, was the Fruitvale Theater. In between, around 35th Avenue and E 14th St., were the Foodvale Market, a two-story department store, the post office, and a number of other businesses. St. Elizabeth's Catholic Church and Cristo Rey De La Salle East Bay High School are both located one block north of International Blvd.

== History ==
Henderson Luelling was an early Oakland, California, settler, horticulturist, Quaker, and abolitionist who introduced varietal fruit trees to the Pacific Coast. His 1854 nursery, Fruit Vale, is the namesake of the Fruitvale neighborhood.

In Salem, Iowa, Luelling had established a fruit and nut tree nursery and dry goods store, but was ousted from the Salem Monthly Meeting of Friends for actively helping slaves escape on the Underground Railroad. In 1847, he migrated west on the Oregon Trail with his wife and their eight children. The family traveled by covered wagon along with a special covered wagon outfitted to transport 700 fruit and nut trees. Half of the trees survived the journey and included apples, pears, peaches, cherries, quince, walnut, and hickory.

After establishing a nursery in what would become Milwaukie, Oregon, in 1854 the family moved to the San Francisco Bay Area. Luelling bought 400 acres on Sausal Creek in what is now Oakland. The orchard he established was called Fruit Vale, the namesake of the present neighborhood of Fruitvale. Luelling is buried in Mountain View Cemetery (Oakland, California).

Luelling sold some acreage to Frederick Rhoda who started his own fruit farm. Rhoda Street, Fruitvale is named for the family, and Lincoln Avenue was named for one of their sons. Another son, Franklin Rhoda was a founder of the Fruitvale Presbyterian Church.

In 1859, Watson Augustus Bray built a home on a property called "Oak Tree Farm" in the neighborhood of Fruitvale; the seventeen-room house, built as a wedding present for their daughter, is now called the Alfred H. Cohen House and remains one of the few 19th century landmarks in the Fruitvale area.

About 80 years later, during and following World War II, massive numbers of African Americans and Latinos migrated to Oakland and located in the old part of town, West Oakland. This era was followed by "urban renewal" and the construction of the Nimitz Freeway, which bulldozed much of West Oakland. There was then a movement of the dispossessed residents to East Oakland. Fruitvale was in the middle part of East Oakland and due to its location was heavily settled by African Americans and Latinos, who by 1990 formed a majority of the district's residents.

It wasn't until the late 1980s that the larger Fruitvale District began to attract more Latino residents. African Americans had either relocated to the outer East Oakland area south of Fruitvale or had moved out of the city altogether to outer Bay Area suburbs. Fruitvale became predominantly Latino, and is the cultural landmark for the city's Latino population.

In the late 1960s and early 1970s, the lower part of the Fruitvale district was heavily settled by Chicanos and Latinos. The Chicano Movement that was going on at the time throughout the Southwest also spread to the Fruitvale district. After the 1968 murder of Charles Pinky De Baca by the Oakland Police Department, the community began to organize against police brutality. One of the first organizations was Latinos United for Justice. Many other militant and non-militant Chicano groups formed. The Brown Berets had a chapter in Oakland, and the Chicano Revolutionary Party was another Chicano militant organization.

The Chicano Revolutionary Party had a free breakfast program that the Black Panthers had helped them create in Jingletown; they also patrolled the streets of Fruitvale and helped defend it against police brutality. La Raza Unida Party also had a chapter in Oakland. The Clinica de la Raza was created due to the actions of the Chicano Movement as a need for a free clinic for the Chicano and Latino community of East Oakland.

There were several actions by Chicanos against the Vietnam War in the Fruitvale district. On July 26, 1970, the Oakland Chicano Moratorium protest against the Vietnam War was held at San Antonio Park. One of the speakers was Chicano radical Rodolfo "Corky" Gonzáles. There were also several Chicano school walkouts against the Vietnam War, primarily at local schools such as Fremont High School and Oakland High School. The Chicano Movement was very much part of Oakland's history, especially in the Fruitvale district. Its contributions are still seen throughout the district.

Fruitvale has been experiencing rapid renovation. In 2004, the Unity Council opened the Fruitvale Transit Village. The "Fruitvale Village" has become a model of transit-oriented development, showcasing a mixture of retail and housing integrated with public transportation.

On New Year's Day in 2009, a transit police officer murdered 22-year old Oscar Grant III as Grant was lying face-down, handcuffed and physically restrained on a platform at the BART Fruitvale Station; the events were captured on bystanders mobile phones; filmmaker Ryan Coogler directed the film Fruitvale Station, released in 2013, based on the events leading to Grant's murder. On December 2, 2016, a fire at a warehouse party in Fruitvale killed at least 36 people.

== Jingletown ==
The subsection of the neighborhood adjacent to the Oakland Estuary is called Jingletown, also called "JT" by East Oakland natives. The history of Jingletown begins with its name, originating from a habit of nearby mill workers, largely males of Portuguese and Azorean background, who would jingle the coins from a week's work in their pockets as they walked to display their prosperity. In the late 1950s and 1960s the Portuguese began moving out and Latinos began moving in, becoming the majority of Jingletown's population. About half of Jingletown's population is still Latino but demographics are changing due to gentrification. In 1998, the neighborhood became home to an award-winning affordable housing project that has helped to revitalize the community. In 2003 a building boom began, with several local developers installing hundreds of market-rate condominiums, lofts and townhomes by the Estuary waterfront. The neighborhood remains home to many working artists who live and work in converted lofts. The neighborhood also used to be home to the Institute of Mosaic Art, and one can see many mosaics displayed on buildings sprinkled throughout the neighborhood.

== Economy ==
Grupo TACA operates an Oakland-area TACA Satellite in Suite 130 at 3411 East 12th Street in Fruitvale Village.

International Boulevard is a major thoroughfare that runs through Fruitvale and is home to many restaurants and businesses. It has been called a "model for development" without gentrification.

== Education ==
Oakland Unified School District operates district public schools.

In addition Oakland Charter Academy and Oakland Charter High School, which are member schools of Amethod Public Schools, are located in Fruitvale.

== Public transportation ==
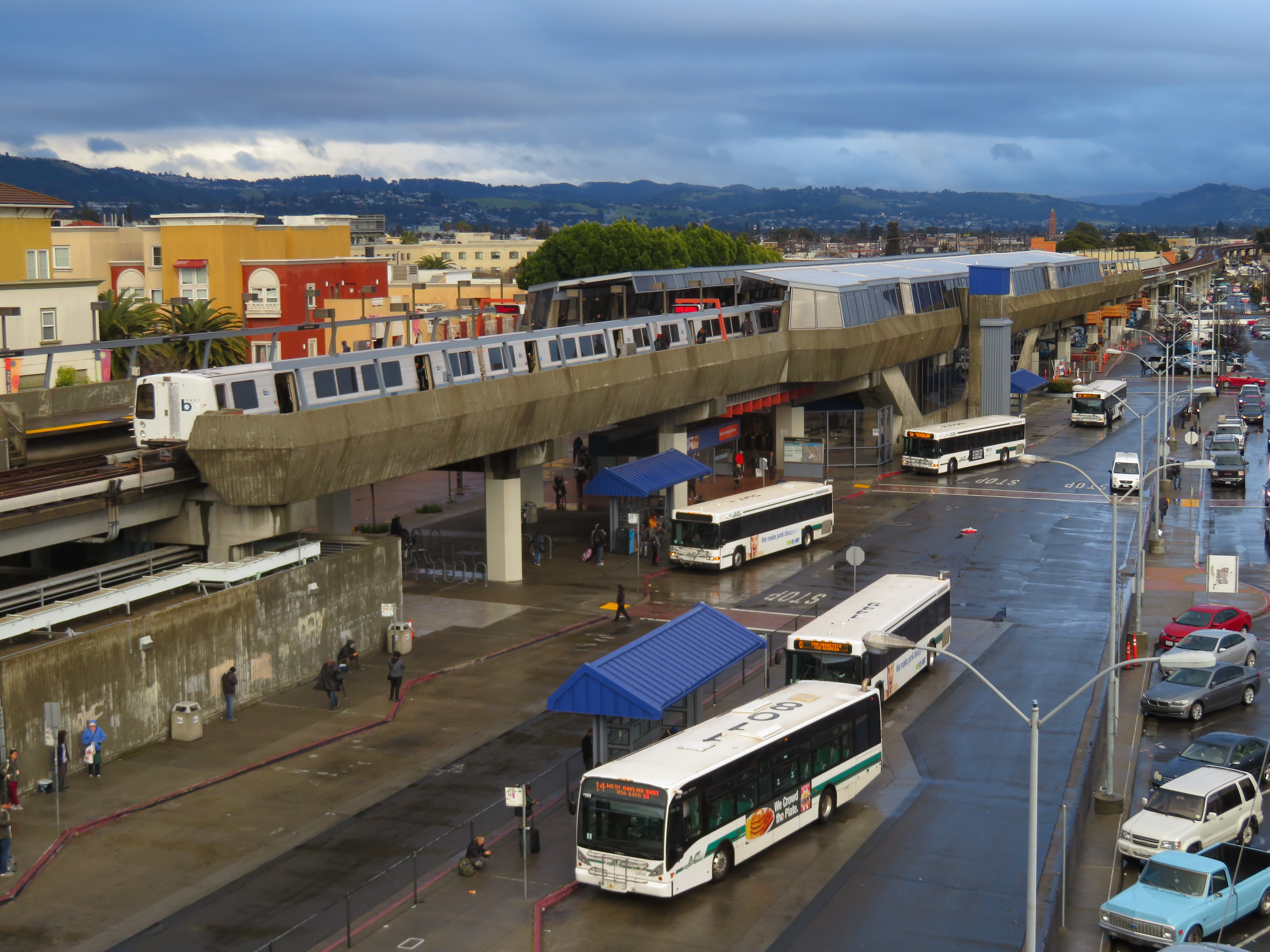
Fruitvale BART station, 2018

The Fruitvale BART station is located near the shopping district, at the corner of 33rd Avenue and East 12th Street.

AC Transit bus lines servicing the district include the 1T, 14, 19, 20, 21, 39, 40, 51, 54, 62, 339 and O lines.
