= American Indian Public Charter School =

Coordinates: 37.79367°N 122.19939°W

American Indian Public Charter

Information
- Opened: 1996
- NCES School ID: 062805005673
- Faculty: 6
- Grades: 5-8
- Enrollment: 196 (2015)

American Indian Public Charter School or AIPCS is an Oakland, California charter middle school with predominantly low-income, minority students. It opened in 1996 and struggled over the next few years until a turnaround after 2000 brought up enrollment numbers and test scores.

By 2005, the AIPCS students achieved test scores superior those of most public schools in the state. Its principal, Ben Chavis (Lumbee), a Native American educator, believed that minority students were best served by high expectations for strong attendance and discipline, as well as regular homework and summer school. Chavis was criticized for some of his methods. In 2007, AICPS became the first public school in Oakland to win the National Blue Ribbon Award. The AICPS attracted an increasingly diverse student body as enrollment increased, with higher proportions of African American, Asian and Latino students than Native Americans. By 2015, its students were overwhelmingly Asian.

The American Indian Model Schools charter system developed from the AIPCS in order to expand the offerings to students. Since 2007, under new management, it has operated three schools in the city, two middle schools (one had grades K-4 added in 2012), and a high school, American Indian Public High School. The charter for the AIMS schools was threatened in 2012 because of discoveries of financial mismanagement and concerns about leadership. Although the Oakland School District voted to revoke the charter, the school system gained a preliminary injunction that allowed it to operate the three schools. With new leaders, it gained a 5-year renewal of its charter in 2013.

Other irregularities were reported in 2012 as the result of a state "extraordinary audit" of the second middle school, AIPCS II. There were allegations of additional mismanagement and fraud. In March 2017 former principal Ben Chavis was indicted by the federal government on six felony counts for money laundering and mail fraud based on his financial activities with the AIMS schools. All financial mismanagement charges against Chavis were dropped in 2019.

== History ==
AIPCS was chartered by the Oakland Unified School District (OUSD) in 1996 with the mission of improving the performance of Native American students in the city. As a charter public school, AIPCS was free to students and had considerable autonomy. Once located in a converted church in Oakland's Laurel District, the school moved to 171 12th Street. The high school is located at 746 Grand Avenue.

Since 2007, the charter school district is known as AIMS, American Indian Model Schools. The first school had a predominantly Native American student population at its founding and it focused on Native American culture. Classes included cultural elements such as traditional bead-making and drumming. Martin Waukazoo, one of the founders of the AIPCS, said that he withdrew from the school board because it did not sufficiently emphasize basic educational skills. He said "They were doing too many fuzzy, warm things like bead-making classes and drum classes. Those are good hobbies, but our kids need to learn to read and write. I felt it was doing more harm than good."

By 2001, the school was failing. Enrollment dropped to 34 and test scores were abysmal. That year, educator Ben Chavis (Lumbee from North Carolina) and a former faculty member at San Francisco State University, became the school principal and initiated numerous changes. Chavis, who had experience as a public school principal, was recruited from Arizona, where he was serving as superintendent of schools at the Fort Apache Indian Reservation.

Chavis replaced most of the school's staff, eliminated bilingual education and Native American cultural content from the curriculum, and gave away all the school's technology equipment. Chavis focused instruction on the California Content Standards and instituted a number of unorthodox disciplinary policies.

In 2005 American Indian Public Charter School had seven teachers. The student teacher ratio was 25 to one. Most of the teachers were in their twenties. During that year, Chavis said that the few teachers who were not credentialed were enrolled in credentialing programs.

As of 2005 AIPCS paid each first-year teacher an annual salary of $42,000 and allowed for a $1,500 bonus at the end of the school year. The annual salary of an entry-level teacher in the Oakland Unified School District was $37,000 during that year.

In the years that followed, the school's enrollment increased and test scores dramatically improved, with the school becoming one of the highest achievers in the state. During the same time period, the percentage of students identifying as American Indian at the school decreased to less than 5%, following the general trend in Oakland's public schools. Students included higher numbers of African Americans, Latino, and Asian Americans; by 2012, students in the three schools of the AIM system were 90% Asian American.

In 2007, the AIPCS board expanded its operation, and founded the American Indian Model Schools system (see related article.) It opened a second middle school campus, AIPCS II, and a high school, the American Indian Public High School (AIPHS). In the same year, Chavis resigned as head of school after several controversies, but he was retained by the board in an executive role until January 2012.

On March 20, 2013, the Oakland School Board in a 4 - 3 vote decided to revoke the three schools' charters. This included the charter for the AIPCS elementary school attended by Chavis' own children. On July 15, 2013, Alameda County Superior Court Judge Evelio Grillo granted the school system a preliminary injunction, allowing all three campuses to remain open.

== Educational approach ==
AIPCS employs a "back-to-basics, squared" approach to schooling. Students spend their academic school day in a self-contained classroom with one teacher. In theory, this teacher stays with these students through their three years at AIPCS, but in practice, high teacher turnover makes this impossible.

AIPCS adheres to the American Indian Model (AIM), the focus of which is excellent student attendance. In keeping with this, originally AIPCS gave cash awards of up to $100 to students who attend every school day for a year and claims yearly attendance rates as high as 99.6%.

The school day at AIPCS begins with three hours of Language Arts and Mathematics, followed by a short lunch period (twenty minutes). Time between classes is intentionally minimal; the school estimates that this adds a week's worth of classroom time per year.

Students are assigned at least 2 hours of homework every night. Students with incomplete work are liable for a detention after school. Struggling students who show little to no improvement over the school year may be retained; one student was held back for earning a "B" in math. All students are required to attend summer school.

The student dress code is khaki- or navy-colored pants and white, collared shirts. Makeup and jewelry are not permitted.

The school had minimal lab equipment in 2012, and science was taught mostly through textbooks. Under Chavis, the school had no televisions, as he believed they led to mischief. The school offers music, performance art, study hall, and club activities after school.

Andrew J. Coulson, Director of the Center for Educational Freedom, says that AIPCS has the formula for maximizing academic achievement for poor minority students: [AIPCS] "instills in the school environment those cultural characteristics necessary for academic success that are missing in the home".

=== Physical education ===
Physical education at AIPCS was offered for forty minutes each school day, and consists of primarily calisthenics and running. Students do not play traditional games such as basketball, football or baseball. According to the AIPCS website, its students in 2007-2008 significantly outperform the Oakland Unified School District average on multiple measures of physical fitness, including aerobic capacity, flexibility, and multiple measures of strength.

=== Discipline ===
AIPCS disciplinary procedures are in line with the California Education Code. Students who are disruptive, submit incomplete work, or misbehave in other ways are assigned an hour of detention after school. Students committing a second infraction in the same week will get an additional hour of detention and four hours of Saturday School.

Other discipline is more unorthodox. For example, Chavis, with parental permission, shaved the head of a student who was accused of stealing, in front of the entire school. In other cases, he punished a girl by making her clean the boys' bathroom, and forced some students to wear embarrassing signs.

Not all AIPCS staff adhere to the methods used by Chavis. Following his departure in 2012, the school administrators eliminated or toned down some of the more unorthodox disciplinary methods.

== Chavis' conservative philosophy ==
We are looking for hard working people who believe in free market capitalism. . . . Multi-cultural specialists, ultra liberal zealots, and college-tainted oppression liberators need not apply.

— AIPCS teacher recruiting statement

Chavis summed up his beliefs in 2007 that liberal thinkers hurt minority students:

They have no standards for minorities. They're like, you know, let's let them get freedom. Let's understand their learning style. Let's give them multiculturalism. And no discipline, no structure, no game plan. So they're destroying us. They've destroyed a whole generation. They've wiped out many more people than the Klan has.

— Ben Chavis

== Test scores ==
From 2000 to 2006, the school's Academic Performance Index (API) more than doubled. (API scores range from a minimum of 200 possible points to a maximum of 1000 possible.)

- In 2001, AIPCS had an API of 440, near worst among Oakland middle schools.
- In 2006, AIPCS had an API of 967. This was the eighth-highest in the state, where the median API is roughly 750, and highest in the state among those schools serving mostly low-income children, which typically score around 650 on the measure. In the same year, the federal government named AIPCS one of the top 250 schools in the country.
- In 2010, AIPCS had an API of 988 - making it the highest-performing middle school in California.

In 2009, the school's 41 8th graders' had the following scores:

California Standard Tests Scores, proficiency rate
English	Mathematics	Science
100%	100%	98%

Note: All AIPCS 8th grade students take Algebra I in the 8th grade, while many California students do not take Algebra I until their first year of high school.

For comparison, test scores of nearby schools were:

- Edna Brewer Middle School students had an API of 782, and proficiency levels of English 51%, Math 53%, Science 67% and History/Social Science 50%
- Westlake Middle School had an API of 680, and proficiency levels of English 30%, Math 34%, Science 46%, and History/Social Science 23%
- Piedmont Middle School, with few low-income students, had an API of 918 and 8th-grade proficiency levels of English 83%, Math 88%, Science 81% and History/Social Science 80%

=== High school scores ===
As of 2009 AIPHS students have also performed very well on standardized tests. Roughly 90% of AIPHS students score at proficient or advanced levels on most subjects, with lower scores in Chemistry and Earth Science. In 2009, AIPHS graduated its first senior class. All 18 graduating seniors were accepted to good four-year colleges for that fall.

=== Questions ===
Charles Murray, a scholar who has studied IQ testing and the author of The Bell Curve, praised AIPCS in a blog of the American Enterprise Institute. He said he would send his own children there. But, he was skeptical about AIPCS' high test scores, saying that in his experience, such dramatic score improvements seldom stood up to scholarly scrutiny. He proposed six questions to be asked, such as whether the scores had been influenced by the "practice effect." He predicted that the apparent test score improvements at AIPCS under Chavis would prove much less impressive once such questions had been answered.

According to 2009 reporting by the Los Angeles Times and Mother Jones, the teachers' union president said that AIPCS was known for "cherry-picking" - that is, recruiting students who would do well and dropping those students who did not perform well academically. AIPCS denied the allegations.

The LA Times noted that half of the 6th-grade students performing poorly in 2007 had left the school before graduation at grade 8. Thirty-nine of the 51 students who started in 2006 completed their middle school years with AIPCS. All the students who entered below-grade level and stayed through the 8th grade did improve their standings. Charles Murray had noted in his blog that the failure to take into account the attrition of poorly performing students, who have dropped out of a school, is often the most decisive indicator that a school's evaluation has been inadequate.

== Demographics ==
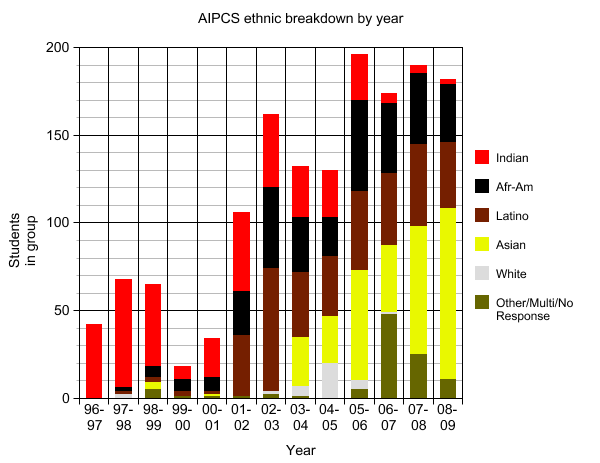
AIPCS ethnic breakdown by year

By 2007–2008, the AIPCS student body demographics had changed. The approximately 180 students represented the following ethnic groups:

- 46% Asian
- 23% African-American
- 22% Latino
- 3% American Indian/Alaskan Native
- < 2% Caucasian, Pacific Islander, Filipino

Approximately 97% of AIPCS students in 2007-2008 were "socioeconomically disadvantaged"

In the earliest years, the school had a larger American Indian population and smaller Asian population.

In 2007 the American Indian Model Schools system opened AIPCS II, located in Oakland's Chinatown neighborhood; 67% of its students were Asian. In 2005-2006 the entering students came to the middle school almost exclusively from the nearby public Lincoln Elementary School. Its students have had high test scores and are predominantly Asian.

Critics have suggested that AIPCS' continued success is due largely to this demographic shift and the success of its Asian student population. But the LA Times reported in 2009 that the school's Asian, African-American, and Latino students performed similarly on standardized tests.

AIPCS staff says the school attracts a representative sample of students from local elementary schools. But California's Office of Charter Schools noted that AIPCS' demographics were out of line with those in the surrounding Oakland Unified School District's jurisdiction. In the total district, Asian students made up 14% of the student population, and African American and Latino students each made up 36% of the population. The differences in the AIMS schools could be the result of its recruiting practices.

== Finances ==
From 2001 to 2008, AIPCS spent under $8,000 per student-year, which was less than half as much per student-year as the surrounding Oakland Unified School District. But the school received more than $200,000 in 2006 from the Walton family foundation, so it was operating with more money than in the public budget. By June 2009, when public schools had a 4.5 percent funding cut, AIPCS had received additional grants of more than $100,000 from the Koret Foundation.

== Chavis controversies ==
When Chavis was the principal at AIPCS and head of the AIMS system, he generated considerable controversy.

=== Use of racially and sexually charged statements ===
As reported by the LA Times in 2009, Chavis tended to call all non-Caucasian students, including African Americans, "darkies." Chavis earlier told the East Bay Express, "I use 'darkie' every day, I use it in the context that I'm Indian and I'm black. I'm a darkie." "I tell the students, if you don't do your work, people are going to call you a lazy Mexican. You're black, they expect you to be an idiot," said Chavis in 2005, who is a blue-eyed Lumbee of mixed-race ancestry, including European American. "I use it to motivate the kids."

Chavis was reported as allegedly having pushed a teacher down a flight of stairs while calling her a "fucking bitch", "stupid bitch", as she tried to retrieve her violin after he fired her; allegedly called his own niece a "slut" and a "lying bitch", and threatened to kill her; and allegedly asked one of the AIPCS female students if a male student "was still trying to suck your titties", which he denied.

In 2007 Chavis allegedly called a Mills College graduate student "a fucking black minority punk" after he showed up fifteen minutes late to a group visit at the school, saying that the student was a "worthless piece of (expletive) people have been making excuses for". Chavis said that he called the grad student a "dumbass minority," and said "he was an embarrassment to his race." He saw no reason to hold his guests to a different standard than AIPCS students, who receive an hour detention if they arrive one second late to school. "He came late. White people are on time. What does he think, there's black time? Mexican time? Indian time? The clock is white."

The evening of the incident with the Mills College team, Chavis told the AIPCS board his intention to step down from his position.

=== Admissions controversies ===
California charter schools are required either to accept all applicants, or, if they have more applicants than capacity, to hold a lottery to determine entrants. AIPCS has never held a lottery. The AIMS board was denied a petition to open a new school in the fall of 2008, in part because AIPCS was "unable to describe" their selection process. AIPCS staff stated they had never needed to hold a lottery because they had never had more applicants than seats. But in the same petition, AIPCS stated its primary motivation for opening an additional school was to serve the many families wishing to enroll that the existing schools could not accommodate.

In 2006, an African-American parent filed a complaint stating that AIPCS told her there was no room for her son and refused to place him on the school's waiting list, even while it was accepting applications from white students. Chavis allegedly told a Caucasian parent that her son would be placed at the top of the school's waiting list because there were too many "darkies" and Asians enrolled in the school. If true, AIPCS violated federal and state laws, which prohibit public schools, including charters, from discriminating by race.

In July 2011, the AIPCS governing board voted Dr. Chavis into an executive position to help with the expansion of the charter model school system. At a board meeting in January 2012, the board announced Dr. Chavis’ resignation and thanked him for his service.

== 2011 "Extraordinary audit" by the state ==
In August 2011, California's Fiscal and Crisis Management Team announced it would conduct an extraordinary audit of AIPCS. The audit focused on management of a federal ASES grant for an after-school program, facilities lease and rent expenditures, and the Political Reform Act of 1974, regarding conflict-of-interest laws.

In early June 2012, the FCMAT published the results of its audit. Key findings in the 65-page document note conclusive documentation of fraud by Chavis in rental agreements, funds siphoned from the SAIL summer program, and bidding for on-site construction projects. The report also noted the lack of fiduciary responsibility by the AIPCS governing board.

Michael Stember resigned from the board of the charter school system between April and June. Jean Martinez became president of the AIPCS governing board. "The allegations against American Indian charter schools officials include $3.7 million in payments [over 4 years] to businesses owned by founder Ben Chavis and his wife, including money for rent, storage fees, construction projects and the administration of summer school programs.”

That year Chavis returned to his home state of North Carolina. His records in California were seized in 2013 and he was under continuing investigation by the FBI and IRS for his financial affairs. He was indicted on six felony charges in March 2017 in federal district court in San Francisco, California, in relation to his management of federal grant monies, and arrested in North Carolina.

== Threat of charter revocation ==
In March 2013, the OUSD Board voted to revoke the AIMS charter. The Alameda County Board of Education has an option to overturn the OUSD decision, and the California Board of Education serves as a final point of appeal. If an appeal is not successful, the revocation will come into effect on June 30, 2013.
