= Pınar Selek =

Turkish sociologist, feminist, writer

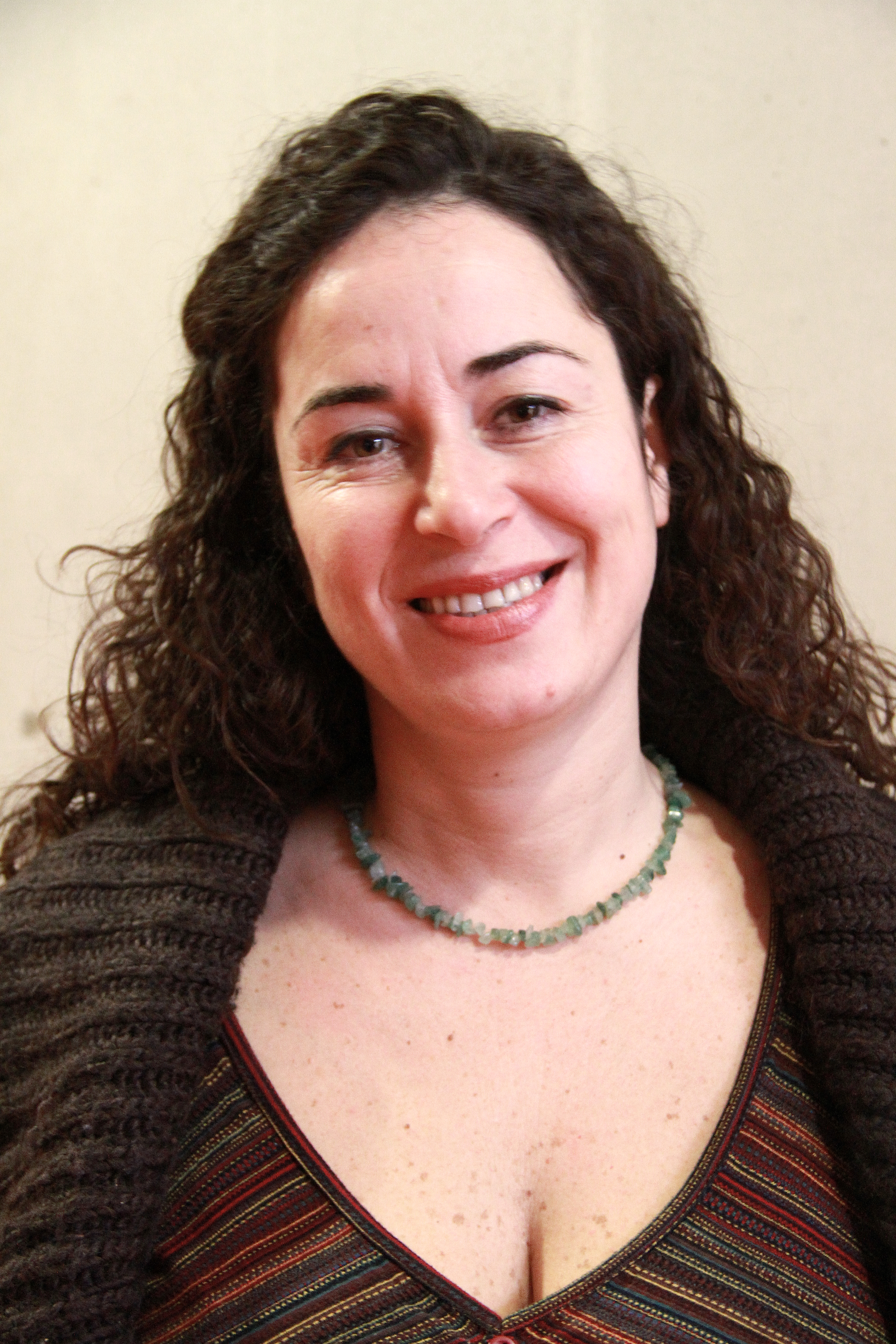
- Pınar Selek in January 2013
- Born: Istanbul, Turkey
- Education: Mimar Sinan Fine Arts University, University of Strasbourg
- Occupations: Sociologist, author
- Writing career
- Subjects: Minority rights, Kurdish issue, women's rights

Pınar Selek (born October 8, 1971) is a Turkish sociologist, feminist, and author. She is known for her work on the rights of vulnerable communities in Turkey, including women, the poor, street children, sexual minorities, and Kurdish communities, and for the ensuing political persecution. She is the author of several books published in Turkish, German, and French, and is one of the founding editors of Amargi, a Turkish feminist journal. She currently resides in France where she obtained academic exile in Strasbourg then Nice under the French PAUSE program. She later obtained a permanent assistant professor position in sociology at Université Côte d'Azur, with the Migrations and Society Research Unit. She became a French citizen in 2017.

Selek has been prosecuted since 1998 in Turkey, in an affair which has attempted to tie her to an explosion that occurred at the Spice Bazaar, Istanbul in 1998, despite police and expert reports showing that the explosion was caused by a gas leak. Tried and acquitted of all charges on four occasions (in 2006, 2008, 2011, 2014), her most recent acquittal was amended on June 21, 2022, by the Supreme Court of Turkey which reversed the court decision and sentenced her to life in prison before a retrial. The retrial was set for March 31, 2023 then pushed back to September 29, 2023, then to June 28, 2024.

She became an "ambassador" for Prison Insider, an information platform on conditions of detention around the world, in 2024.

== Education ==
Selek attended the high school Lycée Notre Dame de Sion Istanbul and completed her undergraduate and graduate studies in the sociology department at Mimar Sinan Fine Arts University. In 2014 she obtained a doctorate in political science from the University of Strasbourg.

== Arrest, imprisonment, and release, 1998–2000 ==
Pınar Selek was arrested on July 11, 1998, in connection to an explosion that had occurred two days prior at the Spice Bazaar, Istanbul, which had killed seven people and wounded approximately 100 others. The arrest is widely considered to have been motivated by her contact with Kurds as part of her academic research. Her work was confiscated, and she refused to name the individuals she had interviewed during the course of her research. Another suspect, Abdülmecit Öztürk, was arrested two weeks after Selek, and confessed to police that the two had carried out the bombing together, although he later recanted his statement and claimed that he had been tortured in police custody. Öztürk was later acquitted of all charges, and his statement against Selek was ruled as inadmissible.

After spending two and a half years in prison, during which time she was subject to torture and ill-treatment, Selek was released on December 22, 2000, when a team of experts, including faculty from Istanbul University's Analytic Chemistry Department and Cerrahpaşa Medical Faculty's Forensic Department, issued reports concluding that the explosion had been caused by the accidental ignition of a gas cylinder. Three expert witnesses assigned by the court also testified that the explosion was caused by a gas leak.

== Acquittals, retrial, and sentencing, 2006–present ==
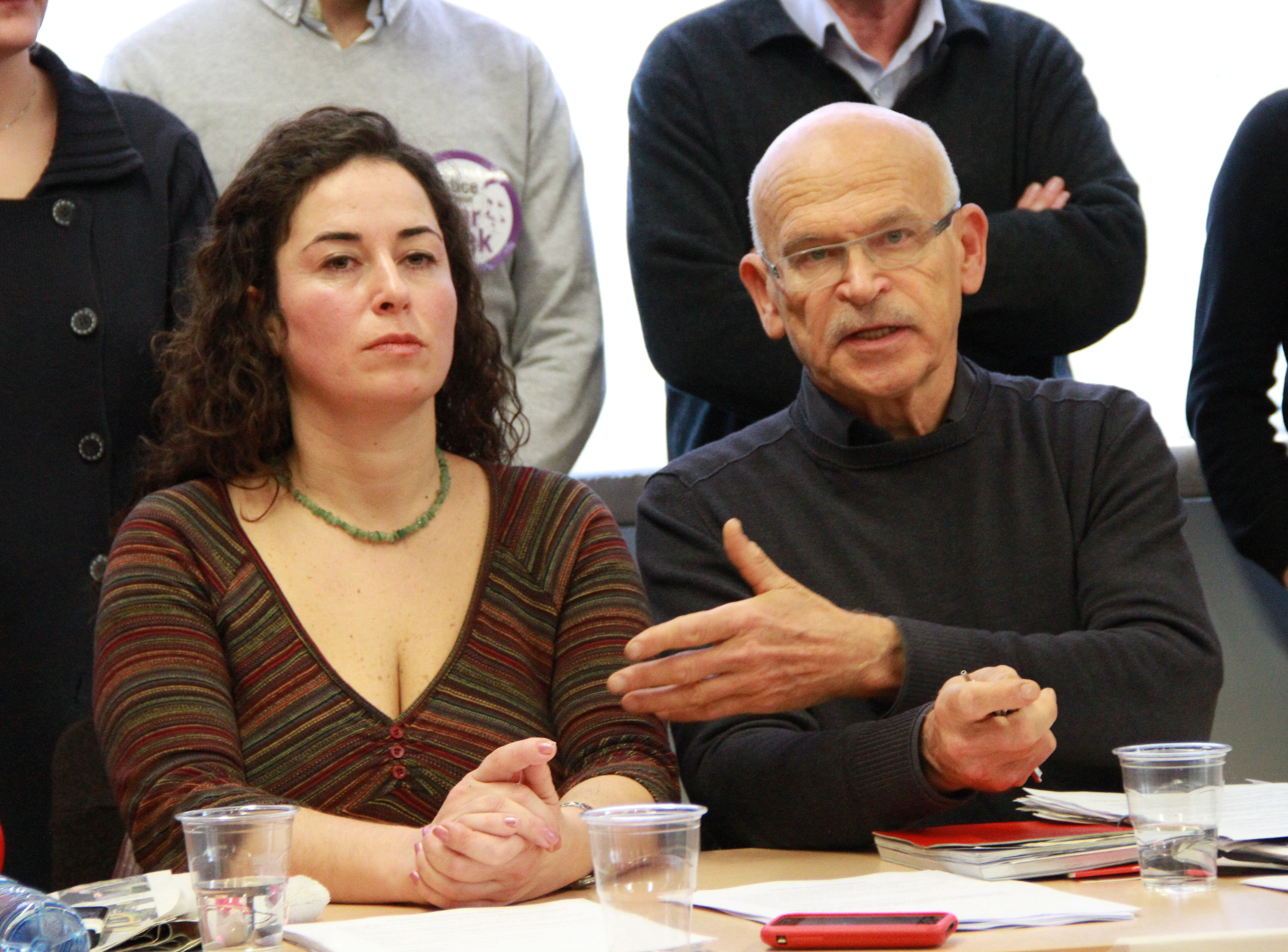
Pınar Selek and Günter Wallraff at a press conference in Strasbourg following her sentencing on January 25, 2013.

The Istanbul High Criminal Court No. 12 acquitted Selek of wrongdoing on four occasions (in 2006, 2008, 2011, 2014), citing a lack of any evidence linking her to the blast. Nonetheless, the court decided on November 22, 2012, to amend its own prior acquittal decisions and reopen her trial, a move which her defense lawyers labeled as "unprecedented in Turkish legal history."

On January 24, 2013, after just over an hour of deliberation, the court sentenced her to life in prison for the 1998 spice bazaar bombing. The decision was reached by majority of two to one, with the head judge in the case issuing a dissenting opinion. While Selek was tried in absentia, more than 30 nongovernmental organizations and political party representatives from France, Germany, Italy, and Austria attended the hearings, and nearly 150 people protested during the trial. Four observers from the University of Strasbourg, including the vice rector, also attended the trial.

After a fourth acquittal on December 19, 2014, the Supreme Court of Turkey reversed the acquittal on June 21, 2022, immediately sentencing Pinar Selek to life in prison. The retrial was set for March 31, 2023, and was attended by a delegation of a hundred lawyers, politicians, academics and representatives of non-governmental organizations, from France, Switzerland, Belgium, Germany, Italy, Norway and Turkey. After the hearing - in which lawyers contested the illegal procedure of the Supreme Court cancelling an acquittal and handing down a new sentence without new evidence or trial - a new trial date was set for September 29, 2023. In similar circumstances with similar international support, this and the consecutive hearings resulted in adjournments : for June 28, 2024, and then for February 7, 2025.

== Support from academic institutions and international organizations ==
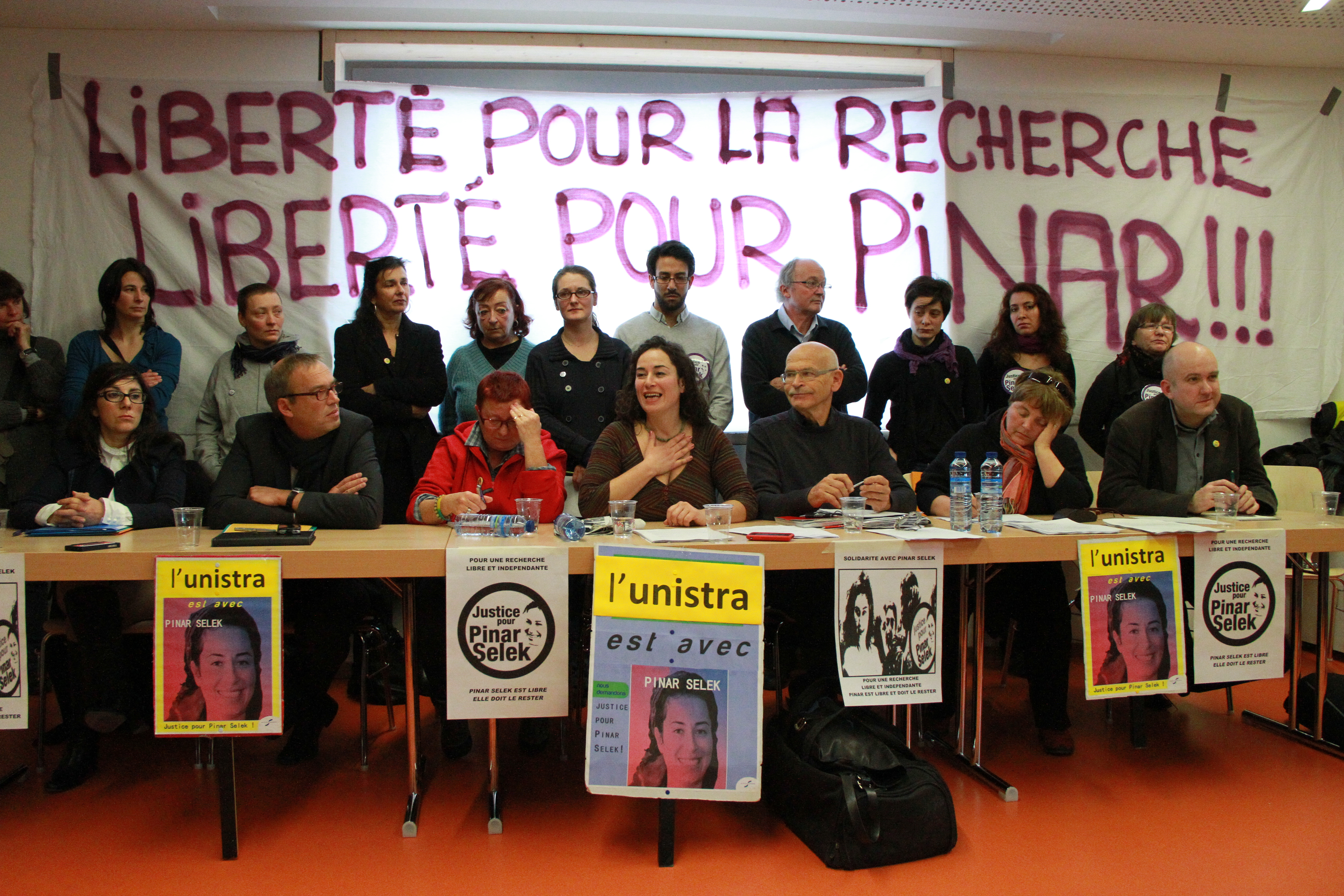
Pınar Selek (center) at a press conference in Strasbourg on January 25, 2013. The banner reads: "Freedom for research. Freedom for Pinar!!!"

Numerous international organizations have voiced solidarity with Selek, including Amnesty International, the Human Rights League and the International Federation for Human Rights (FIDH). The Commissioner for Human Rights of the European Council and the World Organisation Against Torture (OMCT) have called on Turkish authorities to end the 14-year "judicial harassment" of Selek, as this seems " to merely aim at sanctioning her for her legitimate exercise of the freedom of opinion and expression." Human Rights Watch has called her prosecution a "perversion of the criminal justice system and abuse of due process," and insisted that the "baseless charges should be dropped once and for all." PEN International has expressed outrage and concern and argued that the judicial campaign against Selek seeks to penalize her for her "long standing support for and work on minority groups in Turkey." The Transnational Work Group on Academic Liberty and Freedom of Research in Turkey has also issued a statement of solidarity. Turkish journalist Cengiz Çandar called the January 2013 ruling a "travesty" and a "disgraceful judgment."

Multiple academic organizations have also issued statements of support. The Middle East Studies Association of North America (MESA) has expressed its support for Selek and dismay at the prolonged denial of justice she has been subject to. In a letter addressed to Turkish Prime Minister Recep Tayyip Erdoğan, MESA's Committee on Academic Freedom asserted that: "all of the circumstances attendant to her case suggest that Selek has been on trial for the last fourteen years for her research on the PKK in violation of her right to academic freedom." The French Sociological Association has issued statements of support spanning a decade, while other supporting scientific organizations include the French Association des sociologues enseignants du supérieur (ASES), the French Political Science Association, or the Committee of Concerned Scientists, who have condemned the "lack of due process and free expression for academics".

Alain Beretz, president of the University of Strasbourg, has espoused the university's solidarity with Selek, calling her life imprisonment conviction "unjust and revolting." Université Côte d'Azur has publicly stated its "unwavering support" for Selek and the values and academic freedoms her case represents. A collective of academics from France have called her sentencing an attack on the independence of social sciences.

International public figures such as Angela Davis have publicly supported Pinar Selek.

At press conferences following each verdict, Selek has vowed to continue her fight for justice.

== Publications ==
In 1996 she translated Ya Basta into Turkish. It is a collection of letters from the leader of the Zapatistas Subcomandante Marcos. In 2001 Maskeler Süvariler Gacılar was published which focused on the lives of the trans community. She has also published five books and novels in French between 2012 and 2022, as well as two children's books. Recent publications include Le chaudron militaire turc (2023), which analyzes the co-production of masculinity and nationalism through obligatory military service and institutionalised relations to violence.

== See also ==
- Academic freedom
- Human rights in Turkey
- List of prosecuted Turkish writers
- Legal system of the Republic of Turkey
