= American Indian Model Schools =

American charter school system

American Indian Public Charter School II

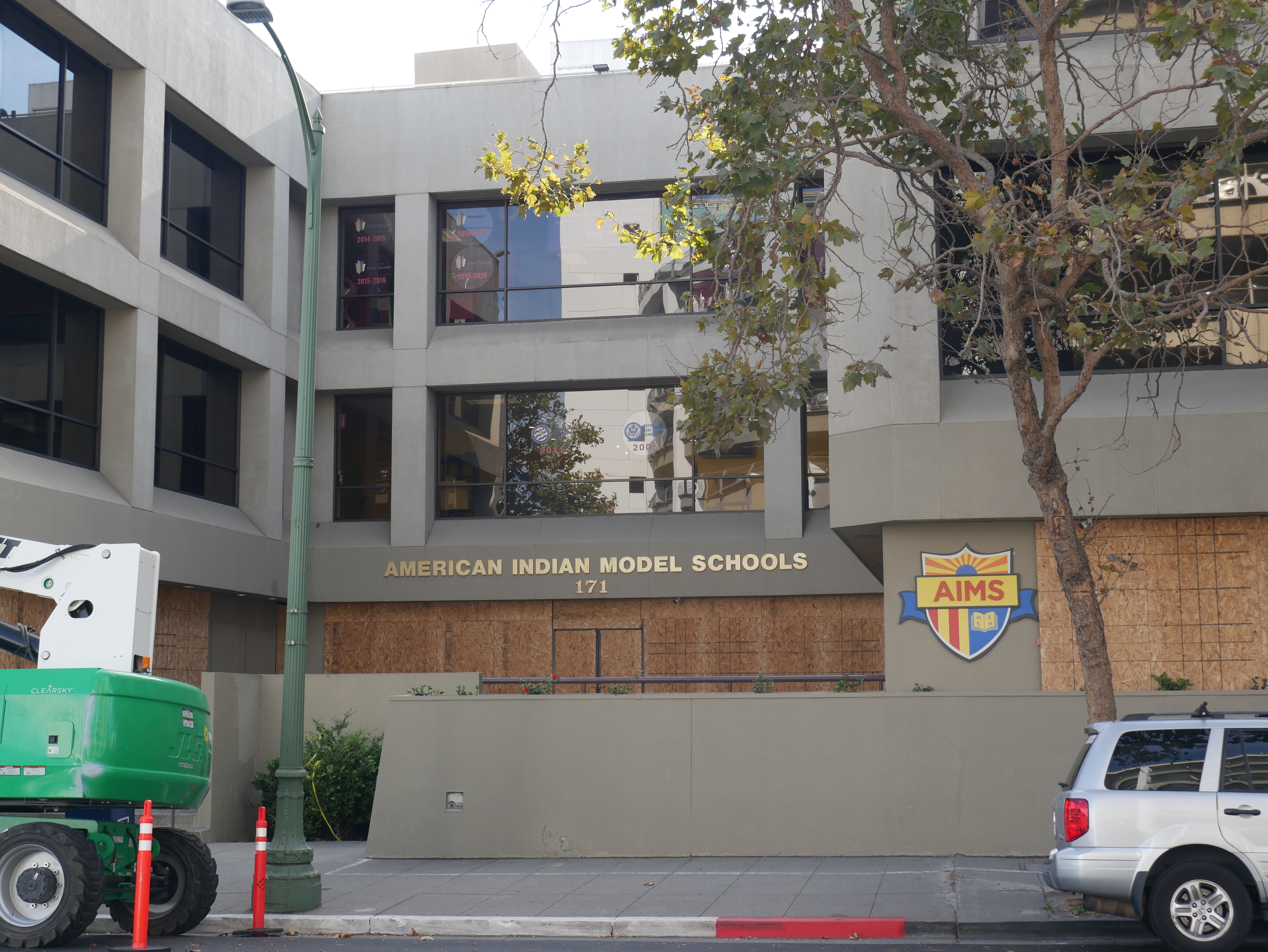

Information
- Faculty: 23
- Grades: K–8
- Enrollment: 616 (2015)
- Website: www.aimschools.org

American Indian Model Schools (AIM Schools) is a charter school system based in Oakland, California. Started with the American Indian Public Charter School (AIPCS), a middle school in the late 1990s to serve Native American students, in 2007 it expanded to include another middle school and a high school. The main campus is in the Laurel area and includes AIPCS, a middle school for grades 5–8, and American Indian Public High School (AIPHS), a high school (9–12). AIPHS students can also take select classes at Merritt College. American Indian Public Charter School II (AIPCS II) has grades K–8 at a second campus located in Oakland's Chinatown. By 2012 the student population of the AIM schools had become 90% Asian American.

The Oakland Unified School District (OUSD) granted the charter to the school system and oversees it. The American Indian Model School system has its own school board and internal policies.

Under the leadership of Ben Chavis (Lumbee), a Native American professor, AIPCS students made considerable progress in academic scores from 2000 to 2007, and enrollment increased at the school. The first middle school, AIPCS, received national recognition in 2007. Some of Chavis's disciplinary methods and his treatment of students and teachers generated controversy, and he resigned as principal in 2007. But the board voted to maintain him in an influential executive role at the school and with the model school system. In 2012, Chavis ended his ties with the charter system (although his children remained as students) and returned to his home state of North Carolina.

For a period, the charter system's charter from the OUSD was at risk, but the school gained a court injunction in 2012, which allowed it to continue operating. With the change in management and in view of the students' achievements in academic scores, the Model School system's charter was renewed in 2013 for a 5-year term. This included an expansion to serve grades K–4 at AIPCS II.

== Overview ==
Established as a small charter school to serve Native American students in Oakland, AICPS had difficulty improving academic performance from its founding in 1996 until after 2000. That year Ben Chavis (Lumbee), was recruited as principal of the school. He recruited new teachers and imposed strong discipline and study protocols. Test scores increased dramatically over the next several years and student enrollment also increased. Student demographics changed, reflecting the diverse population with more students of Asian, African American and Latino ancestry.

The AIM system was established in 2007, expanding to an additional two charter schools: another middle school and a high school. The schools were recognized for academic performance, but controversy was generated by Chavis's discipline system and treatment of both students and faculty. He resigned in 2007 but retained influence at the schools.

According to a California state "extraordinary audit" released in 2012, Chavis directed at least $3.8 million in school payments to businesses owned by him and his wife, Marsha Amador, without proper contracting. The charter board was criticized in the audit for lax financial management and accounting.

The Oakland School Board had already requested in 2011 that the California Board of Education revoke and deny renewal of American Indian Public Charter School II's (AIPCS II) charter; this action would have closed that school after the 2011–2012 academic year. The school system gained a preliminary court injunction to allow its three facilities to continue to operate.

== History ==
The American Indian Public Charter School opened in 1996. It was intended to serve Native American students in the Oakland, California; historically Native Americans had low academic performances in the public schools. Martin Waukazoo, the executive director of the Native American Health Center, was one of the founders of the school. But, shortly after the school was founded, Waukazoo withdrew his support because he believed it put too much emphasis on Native American cultural classes and not enough emphasis on basic educational skills.

After its founding, the school had a high staff turnover rate and insufficient funds for textbooks and computers. In 2000 the Oakland Unified School District (OUSD) considered closing the school. Nanette Asimov of the San Francisco Chronicle reported that the school, which had 37 students, was "sinking fast," could not keep its students, and did not have "viable test scores."

Evelyn Lamenti, an employee with the OUSD Office of Indian Education, recruited Ben Chavis (Lumbee), to serve as principal. Formerly a professor at San Francisco State College, Chavis was then teaching at the University of Arizona. Lamenti believed that he would succeed due to his background in education, interest in charter schools, and knowledge of children living in inner-city communities.

In 2000, Chavis became the head of the school. He fired most of the school's employees and eliminated the Native American cultural classes. Chavis said that he recruited new teachers who had "strong" academic backgrounds and "didn't see the students as victims, even though their lives often are incredibly difficult." By 2001, he had replaced all but one teacher.

By 2002, the school's enrollment tripled, and its test scores were increasing. For the school year 2006–2007, Chavis and his board founded the American Indian Model School system, adding the American Indian Charter High School at the beginning of the school year in September 2006.

In 2006, AICPS became the first public school in Oakland to win the National Blue Ribbon Award.

Due to complaints from parents and teachers about his treatment, and a provocative incident with Mills College faculty and a graduate student in 2007, OUSD officials asked the AIM governing board to direct Chavis to act in a different manner. In response, the AIM board fined Chavis $700. Kirsten Vital, an OUSD accountability head, said that this was not likely to correct such issues as the Mills incident.

On March 15, 2007, Chavis told the AIM school board that he was leaving his post. The minutes of the board meeting said he would remain as a part-time employee. But Chavis said he would return to Arizona. Mitchell Landsberg of the Los Angeles Times reported in 2009 that Chavis "remains a presence at the school." The website referred to Chavis as an "advisor emeritus."

Janet Roberts, a former teacher, succeeded Chavis that year as the head of the school system. Roberts said that Chavis's resignation appeared to quiet criticisms of the school. As reported by Katy Murphy of the Oakland Tribune, Roberts said, "Many assumed that the academic success of the American Indian schools was personality-driven[...] but the program didn't lose its edge after Chavis left."

On June 2, 2009, the first class of the high school AIPHS, consisting of 18 students, graduated. Each of the students had been admitted to a good college.

== 2011 state "Extraordinary Audit" begins ==
In August 2011, California's Fiscal Crisis & Management Assistance Team (FCMAT) announced that American Indian Model Charter Schools would undergo an "extraordinary audit." Alameda County School Superintendent Sheila Jordan had recommended it based on an anonymous complaint from a former AIPCS employee. The audit focused on the ASES grant for an after-school program, facilities lease and rent expenditures, and the Political Reform Act of 1974 regarding conflict of interest laws. Oakland Unified School District (OUSD) Charter School Office Director, Gail Greely was responsible for delivering the FCMAT report and monitoring the process. She transferred to become the Director of Charter School Education for Alameda County working for Sheila Jordan. The FCMAT audit report was expected to be released in mid-2012.

== 2012 Charter renewal hearings ==
During the 2012 charter renewal process for the second middle school, AIPCS II, the Oakland Office of Charter Schools (OCS) found practices in violation of the charter and applicable law. OCS also found a lack of responsible governance on the part of the AIPCS governing board, and poor financial accountability. The shortcomings of the school adversely affected parents and students; financial resources were not used to address the needs of students. OCS noted the following strength of the model school system: AIPCS II did pursue its measurable student outcome in its current charter and met its AYP. The following challenges were noted: adherence to the proposed educational program and compliance with regulatory elements (financial audits, reporting, enrollment, admissions, Brown Act, Political Reform Act).

On April 4, 2012, the OUSD board held its AIPCS II charter renewal hearing. OCS recommended denying and revoking the charter. President London of the OCS suggested OUSD could deny the charter and AIPCS II could renew with Alameda County, pending expected results of the state's FCMAT "extraordinary audit". OCS noted that Chavis had served as both lessee and lessor, that his personal car insurance was paid by the school (the school does not have any cars), and that school checks were made out to a charter board member, among other financial issues.

AIM Schools Board President Michael Stember defended AIPCS II, and Christina Chen, the charter system's new accountant, denied all charges. Given the outstanding student achievements noted in API, and numerous parents, staff, and students who spoke in support of the school, the OUSD board voted 4–3 to renew the AIPCS II charter for another five years. The board will return to the issue in two years to verify training of the AIPCS governing board and more rigorous accounting practices at the school. The approved charter allowed AIPCS II to expand to include elementary grades K–4. It became a K–12 school. See minutes. See minutes.

== 2012 FCMAT audit published ==
In early June 2012, the FCMAT audit was published. Evidence of fraud was listed, with recommendations to forward the audit to the local District Attorney. Michael Stember resigned from the charter school system board between April and June. Jean Martinez was elected as President of the AIPCS Model School governing board. As reported by SF Gate, "The allegations against American Indian charter schools officials include $3.7 million in payments to businesses owned by founder Ben Chavis and his wife, including money for rent, storage fees, construction projects and the administration of summer school programs."

On September 27, 2012, the Oakland School Board voted to issue a "Notice of violation to American Indian Public Charter School." School Board President Jody London, David Kakashiba, Jumoke Hodge and Gary Yee voted to issue the notice. Chris Dobbins and Alice Spearman voted against it, and Noel Gallo was absent. After issuing the notice of violation, Board Members Yee and Hodge urged concerned parents to recognize that OUSD was not closing the school but "curing it." American Indian Public Charter School's Board sued the Oakland School Board and OUSD for what they said was an effort at a hostile takeover of the school. Gail Greely, in the OUSD Charter office, provided concerned parents with an outline of a school closure process.

== Charter revocation ==
On January 23, 2013, the OUSD Board voted to issue a "Notice of Intent to Revoke" to the AIMS charter system and scheduled a public hearing for February 27, 2013. On March 20, 2013, the OUSD board voted 4–3 to revoke the AIMS charter effective June 30, 2013. Supporters vowed to appeal to the county and state boards of education.

During the next months, the Alameda County Board of Education and California Board of Education were expected to review the issues and decide whether to overturn the OUSD trustees' decision to revoke the AIMS charter.

On July 15, 2013, Alameda County Superior Court Judge Evelio Grillo granted the Model Schools system a preliminary injunction, allowing all three campuses to continue to operate. In consideration of student scores and a change in management of the board and charter system, the AIMS charter was renewed for five years. On January 25, 2017, the OUSD Governing Board renewed the charter for another five years, from June 1, 2017, to June 30, 2022. However, due to changes in California State law, AIPCS II's charter term was automatically extended to June 30, 2025, without requiring any action by the OUSD board.

== Campuses ==
As of 2017, the system includes three schools, American Indian Public Charter School (AICPS), a middle school with grades 5–8; American Indian Public Charter School II (AIPCS II), K–8; and American Indian Public High School (AIPHS), a high school (9–12).

The school system has two campuses. The original American Indian Public Charter School and the main campus of American Indian High School occupy a converted church located off MacArthur Boulevard, in the Laurel area of Oakland. AIPCS II is located on another campus in the city's Chinatown. Students at AIPHS attend dual credit classes within the Peralta Community College District online, though could be done on a physical campus if requested.

AICPS II shared a campus with Little Hands School. AICPS II serves students living in Chinatown and the Lake Merritt area. AICPS also admits students living in other areas of Oakland. The school states that it will consider the applications of students who live outside of Oakland.

== Operations ==
In 2009 Kevin Drum of Mother Jones said "[...] AIPC is a super-strict, teach-to-the-test, no-goofing-off kind of place that apparently gets good results."

=== Student discipline ===
Mitchell Landsberg of the Los Angeles Times reported in 2009 that the AIM students "are subject to disciplinary procedures redolent of military school." At AIMS schools, students who are late to class, do not complete homework, or violate the dress code automatically receive detention. A student who misbehaves once a week gets one after-school detention lasting one hour. A student who misbehaves again in the same week will receive another after-school detention and a four-hour Saturday detention. Landsberg said that by the time students become eighth-graders, "discipline is not really an issue. Classes are preternaturally quiet and focused. Visitors may be startled to notice that students do not so much as glance at them. They have been told to keep their attention on their work. They do as they are told."

==== Discipline under Chavis ====
During the Chavis era, students who repeatedly violated rules were humiliated by Chavis or by teachers. The administration often used name-calling, stereotypes, and profanities against students. Some students were forced to hold signs that insulted the students. Robert Gammon of the East Bay Express reported in 2007 that "Chavis's boorish behavior has been tolerated because of his school's incredible test scores." Simone Sebastian of the San Francisco Chronicle reported that in the Chavis era, such disciplinary practices were criticized.

Kirsten Vital, accountability head of the Oakland Unified School District, said in a letter to the AIM governing board dated July 9, 2007, that during a visit to the AIPCS, she witnessed, in the words of Nanette Asimov of the San Francisco Chronicle, "incidents bordering on educational malpractice, and that came close to child endangerment." Vital cited Chavis using the words "darkies" and "whities" to refer to racial and ethnic backgrounds in front of students, Chavis referring to a former employee as a "white b --" [sic] while in the presence of students, and the school forcing a girl to clean a boys' restroom as a punishment for bad behavior.

A poster in the AIPCS hallway included a quote from Chavis, saying, "You do outstanding things here and you'll be treated outstanding. You act like a fool and you'll be treated like one." Landsberg said in 2009 that the concept was still in use at AIMS schools but had been "toned down" since Chavis' departure as head of the system.

== Philosophy ==
Under Chavis, the school system's administration opposed U.S. liberal philosophies, and it promoted free-market capitalism. Chavis opposed teacher's unions. Landsberg reported that the AIM system schools "sometimes seem like creations of television's Colbert Report" and that the AIM system schools "mock liberal orthodoxy with such zeal that it can seem like a parody." American conservatives praised Chavis and the AIM Schools. Columnist George Will said he favored the charter school system because its "new paternalism" could close achievement gaps between socioeconomic classes.

== School uniforms ==
Students are required to wear school uniforms. Students wear white shirts and dark-colored trousers. The school does not permit students to wear makeup, jewelry, or brightly colored hair accessories.

== Demographics ==
=== Student body ===
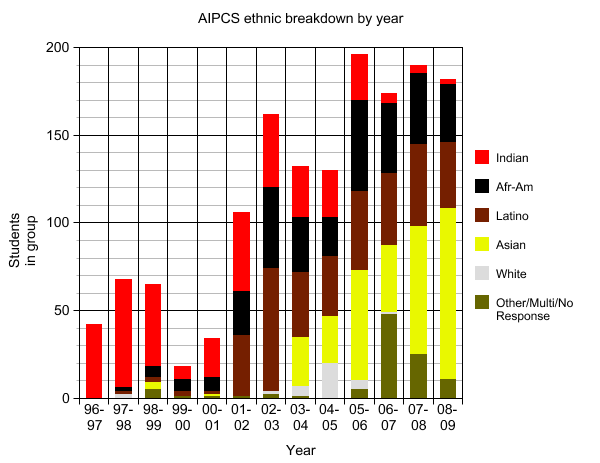
American Indian Public Charter School ethnic breakdown by year, from 1996/1997 to 2008/2009

From 2000 to 2012, the demographics of the schools in this charter system changed markedly, and by 2012 served a student body that was 90% Asian American. In 2000, the small AIPCS had a 62% Native American student body. In 2001, the school increased its enrollment to about 100 students. Fifty-two percent of the students were Native American. According to Chavis, during that year, 12 to 15 percent of the children were homeless. During Chavis's tenure, the proportion and number of Native American students in AIPCS and the new schools decreased. In 2005, twenty percent of the students were Native American. In 2006, the percentage of Native Americans was 13%. However, Mills College visitors to the school in March 2007, report that at the time of their visit, the student body of the school was "10% American Indian."

By that year, the school began to receive many Asian Americans from Laurel. In the 2010–2011 school year, the AIM system had more than 86% Asian American students, while the overall Oakland Unified School District was 13% Asian. In 2010-2011, the school had no Native American students. As of 2012 more than 90% of the AIPCS student body was Asian American. The next largest ethnic groups were African Americans and Hispanic Americans. In 2009, almost all of the students were low-income.

Ellen Cushing of the East Bay Express reported that the demographics had become "homogenous" and that the demographic change was "an ironic twist for a school that was originally intended to serve American Indians—and which is still thought of by many as a haven for a population that's struggled mightily with institutional oppression." Cushing said that "one prominent member of the Bay Area American-Indian community" who asked to be anonymous said that many Native Americans feel upset by the school's name, and "If anything, I just wish they would change their name—it's misleading, and potentially damaging to our community."

In 2012, the original AICPS drew students from several elementary schools. During the same year, John Melvin, the principal of Lincoln Elementary School, a high-performing OUSD elementary school, said that 75% of his students went to nearby AICPS II, although they had previously attended the public Westlake Middle School.

Cushing reported that "AIPCS II is mere blocks away from Lincoln, making it a defacto neighborhood school." She reported that Gary Yee, an OUSD board member and husband of a Lincoln Elementary teacher, said AICPS II had a "rigorous teaching style [...] similar to what you might find in an elite East-Asian school, perhaps making it more appealing to Lincoln's overwhelmingly Asian-American parent base." Several Chinese-American parents of AIMS students expressed support in 2012 for the school's rigorous methods.

=== Faculty ===
As of 2009, most AIM system teachers were young, had degrees from first-rate universities, and were, in the words of Mitchell Landsberg of the Los Angeles Times, "self-confident" and "mature."

== Curriculum ==
In the AIM middle schools, one teacher is intended to teach all of the subjects for a given class and to accompany them for all three years as part of developing a close relationship with all students. The regular teacher does not teach physical education. In most American middle schools, teachers specialize in different subjects and teach different classes, with students moving among teachers.

Mitchell Landsberg of the Los Angeles Times reported, "Five minutes per passing period might not sound like much, but over the course of a year, American Indian saves the equivalent of more than a week's worth of instruction." A middle school teacher is assigned to stay with the same class for all three years until the class graduates. However, Landsberg reported in 2009 that this policy seemed to be more theoretical than real, given the high teacher turnover.

Each middle school day begins with three hours of language arts and mathematics classes. For middle school students English and mathematics make up 90 minutes per day. Afterwards, students have a thirty-minute lunch period. During each day, students have 60 minutes' worth of physical education instruction. The school system has few classes that do not directly affect standardized test scores. Carey Blakely, a former American Indian system teacher, said "I don't see it as teaching to the test. I see it as, there are certain skills and knowledge that you're supposed to impart to your students, and the test measures whether your students have acquired those skills and that knowledge." The school system only allows instruction in arts to take place after school.

The AIM system schools do not have laboratory equipment for science classes. Because of this and the school's emphasis on learning from textbooks, Landsberg said "it is hard to imagine that American Indian will turn out the next Darwin or Edison." As of 2011, AIM classrooms do not have computers and televisions. Additionally, AIMS lacks a playground, science lab, or any of the amenities found in a typical public school like Lincoln, just a couple blocks away. Chavis disapproved of the use of computers since he believed computers could cause students to easily access pornography. He believed they could invite theft and lead to unforeseen expenses.

Students are assigned homework, so they generally have at least three hours of work to do each night. Students at the AIM system middle schools are required to attend four weeks of summer school each summer. In addition, AIMS students must complete a lot of homework, even on weekends and "breaks," such as summer and spring break.

All AIM middle school students take Algebra I during the eighth grade.

== Admissions ==
In the State of California, charter schools are required to take all students who apply to the school if they have enough capacity to house them. If a charter school has more prospective students than space available to house them, it must hold a lottery. The AIM school system, as of 2009, has never held a lottery. Ben Chavis and Janet Roberts, a school principal in the AIM system, said that AIM never received enough students to require the system to hold a lottery.

In the fall of 2008, the State of California did not allow the AIM system to open a new campus. This decision was partly due to the AIM administrators' inability to explain the system's selection process.

Chavis and Roberts said in 2009 that the American Indian system attracts representative samples of students from various public elementary schools in Oakland. Ron Smith, the principal of Laurel Elementary School and a parent of two AIM system children, said that of the children who went from Laurel to the AIM system, "I'd say 70% are academically strong, and 30% are a cross-section. ... They have kids who I know could go anyplace in the state and succeed."

The AIM school system did not disclose the elementary school test scores of its students. Mitchell Landsberg of the Los Angeles Times could not determine whether the students at American Indian middle schools had above-average scores in the elementary school grades.

In a letter dated June 9, 2006, sent to the Oakland Unified School District (OUSD), a parent reported that when she tried to register her child at AIPCS, officials told her that they were not accepting students and were not placing children on waitlists. She explained that when she talked to a White coworker afterward, the coworker informed her that his son received a spot on the waitlist. The coworker further stated that Chavis had said that the school needed more White students, so the child would be placed at the top of the waitlist.

Other critics of the AIM System schools speculated that the school tries to recruit high-performing elementary school students and that it banishes low-performing students before the testing season.

== Academic performance ==
In May 2009, American Indian Public Charter School had an Academic Performance Index (API) of 967. Mitchell Landsberg of the Los Angeles Times said that the other two AIM schools "are not far behind." The state API target is 800. The state average of public middle and high schools is 750. The state average of schools with underprivileged students is 650. Of the public schools in California, four middle schools and three high schools had higher API scores than AIPCS during that year; none of them had a student body of mostly underprivileged students. Mitchell Landsberg stated that while critics of the school often said that the high number of Asian American students causes the test scores to be high, the African American and Hispanic students "do roughly as well—in fact, better on some tests" so "[t]hat makes American Indian a rarity in American education, defying the axiom that poor black and Latino children will lag behind others in school." In 2008, Janet Roberts, the head of the AIM system, said that the speculation that the increased numbers of Asian students caused test scores to go higher demonstrated that the educational establishment has low expectations of low-income African American, Hispanic and Latino, and Native American children.

Landsberg said that the school system has high performance because it "attracts academically motivated students, relentlessly (and unapologetically) teaches to the test, wrings more seat time out of every school day, hires smart young teachers, demands near-perfect attendance, piles on the homework, refuses to promote struggling students to the next grade and keeps discipline so tight that there are no distractions or disruptions. Summer school is required." Landsberg added "There is no secret to any of this. Portions of the American Indian model resemble methods used by the KIPP charter schools or, for that matter, urban parochial schools."

Between 2001 and 2005, while AIPCS was under Ben Chavis, the API increased by over 200% to 880, making it, in 2005, the middle school in Oakland with the highest API. The next highest Oakland middle school was almost 80 points lower than AIPCS.

In 2008, every AIM system eighth grader scored either a "proficient" or a higher rating in the State of California algebra examination. In California, half of the eighth graders overall took algebra. Of all of the state's eighth-grade students who took algebra, fewer than half scored "proficient" or higher.

Kevin Drum of Mother Jones argued that while the AIMS schools get high test scores, the teaching style may not get the same results in every type of school. Drum cited the small sizes of AIMS schools and that the system "plainly attracts only parents and children who are academically motivated in the first place" and "requires middle school teachers to teach every subject and keeps them on a grueling pace, which means lots of turnover." Drum further argued that "the odds that the AIPC formula is scalable to an entire school district is nil."

=== Student progress ===
Ron Smith, the principal of Laurel Elementary School, disclosed the middle school test scores of the 51 students from Laurel who entered the AIM system in 2004, showing their progress in English and mathematics between the 6th and 8th grades. Landsberg said, "It's impossible to tell whether the students were academically strong at the start of sixth grade or were brought up to grade level by the rigors of a year at American Indian." Of the students from Laurel who had completed the 6th grade at the AIM system, 39 finished all three years at the AIM system.

Of the 51 students, six scored lower than proficient in both English and mathematics at the end of their 6th-grade year. According to Landsberg, three of these students left the AIM system and the remaining three "showed some progress" by the end of their final year. Landsberg said that he could not determine why the three students left the school. In 2009, the AIPC insisted that it had never expelled any student for any reason and that some students voluntarily left because they moved or because their families decided that the school was not well suited to them. Around 2005, the school overall loses 10 students per year. Chavis said that most students moved out. Some parents quoted in the San Francisco Chronicle said they removed their children because they were dissatisfied with the authoritarian environment. Chavis said that he encouraged some students to leave.

Patricia Gimbel, the dean of admissions for Deerfield Academy, a private university preparatory school in Massachusetts, said in 2005 that AIPCS had "taken kids who are not the brightest and propelled them to the top of state standards." Betty Olson-Jones, the president of the Oakland Education Association, the teachers' union of the Oakland schools, said that the AIM system "had a reputation among the local public schools as being very interested in kind of recruiting kids who are going to do well, and getting rid of kids who won't." Ben Chavis and Janet Roberts, a school principal in the AIM system, said that this was not true.

== See also ==
- Amethod Public Schools
