= Friends University =

Christian university in Wichita, Kansas, US

- Type: Private university
- Established: 1898; 128 years ago
- Religious affiliation: Non-denominational Christian, founded by Religious Society of Friends (Quakers)
- Endowment: $69.3 million (2025)
- President: Amy Bragg Carey
- Faculty: 319
- Students: 2,782
- Undergraduates: 1,944
- Postgraduates: 838
- Location: Wichita, Kansas, U.S. 37°40′42″N 97°22′00″W
- Campus: Urban, 54.5 acres (22.1 ha)
- Colors: Scarlet and gray
- Nickname: Falcons
- Sporting affiliations: NAIA – KCAC
- Mascot: Freddy Falcon
- Website: friends.edu
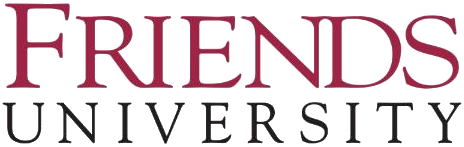

Friends University is a private nondenominational Christian university in Wichita, Kansas, United States. It was founded in 1898. The main building was originally built in 1886 for Garfield University but was donated in 1898 to the Religious Society of Friends (Quakers) by James Davis, a St. Louis business man. In the 1930s the leadership of the school was turned over to an independent board of trustees, with some representation of the Mid-America Yearly Meeting of Friends on the board. It operates today with "an amicable but independent relationship with the evangelical branch of the Society of Friends."

== History ==
=== Garfield University ===
The building now known as the Davis Administration Building and formerly as University Hall was designed by architects Proudfoot & Bird and completed in September 1887 to house Garfield University. Garfield was an effort by the Christian Churches of Kansas led by W.B. Hendryx to build a Christian college in the Wichita area. Hendryx wanted to name the college after his good friend, U.S. President James Garfield. At the time, it occupied the largest single building used for educational purposes west of the Mississippi River. It is listed on the National Register of Historic Places.

Garfield University opened its doors for classes in 1887. The university had 500 students enrolled for the first year and 1,070 for the second year. After graduating its first and only senior class, Garfield University closed its doors in 1890 due to financial difficulties. The school was reorganized and opened again in March 1892 as Garfield Central Memorial University. It closed for good November 18, 1893.

As crop failures and deaths made it difficult for pledges to be paid, the university floundered financially. Edgar Harding of Boston eventually became the owner of the property and began putting out ads for someone to purchase it; James Davis of St. Louis, a Quaker, answered one of those ads. Davis proclaimed he would "buy a college and give it to the Quakers with his first million dollars". After three visits to the building that would eventually be named after him, he began looking into purchasing the land.

=== Friends University ===
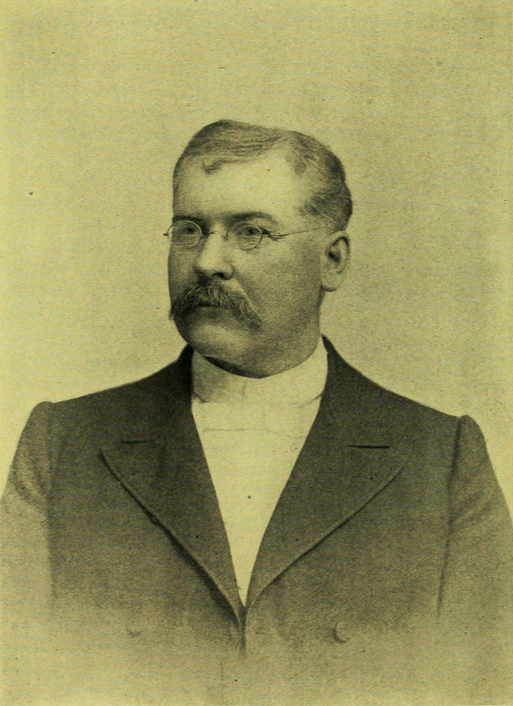
Edmund Stanley

On March 31, 1898, Davis had closed the purchase. Representatives were called in May of that year for a called meeting of the Kansas Yearly Meeting of Friends, because Davis wanted classes to begin that autumn and the meeting was not scheduled until October. The Friends unanimously decided to accept the offer and Edmund Stanley, a clerk of the Kansas Yearly Meeting, was recruited to serve as Friends' first President.

In October, at the scheduled meeting, Stanley reported that the school was opened on September 21, 1898, and that "In accordance with the purposes in organizing and maintaining a denominational institution for higher education, we are encouraging such movements as will cultivate and stimulate spiritual growth and development." He also acknowledged additional gifts from local citizens of Wichita (Davis included) in the form of works of art.

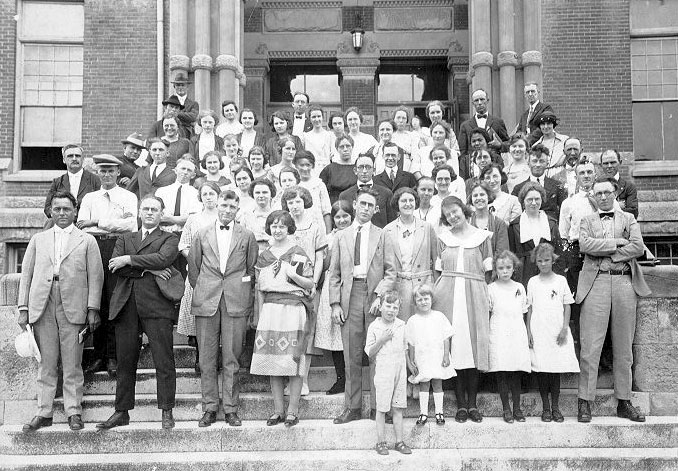
The Kansas Yearly Meeting Summer Conference on the steps of Davis, 1922

53 students enrolled initially, of whom only 12 were ready for college work. A college of liberal arts and a preparatory department offered classes in Literature, History, Mathematics, Astronomy, Bible, German, Elocution, and oratory. Classes were also available in Piano, Voice, and Music Harmony and Theory.

President Stanley shared the vision and future he saw for the university during the opening meeting: "The purpose of this school shall be to give to the world and to give our country a class of citizens that will be in every sense loyal citizens. Loyalty has in it more than we often think... Loyalty means that mental training and discipline which makes the child think, the development which makes him strong in mind and body, strong in his moral nature, a full man in that intelligence which should direct the efforts of all men for conscientious, honorable and successful private life and citizenship."

== Academics ==
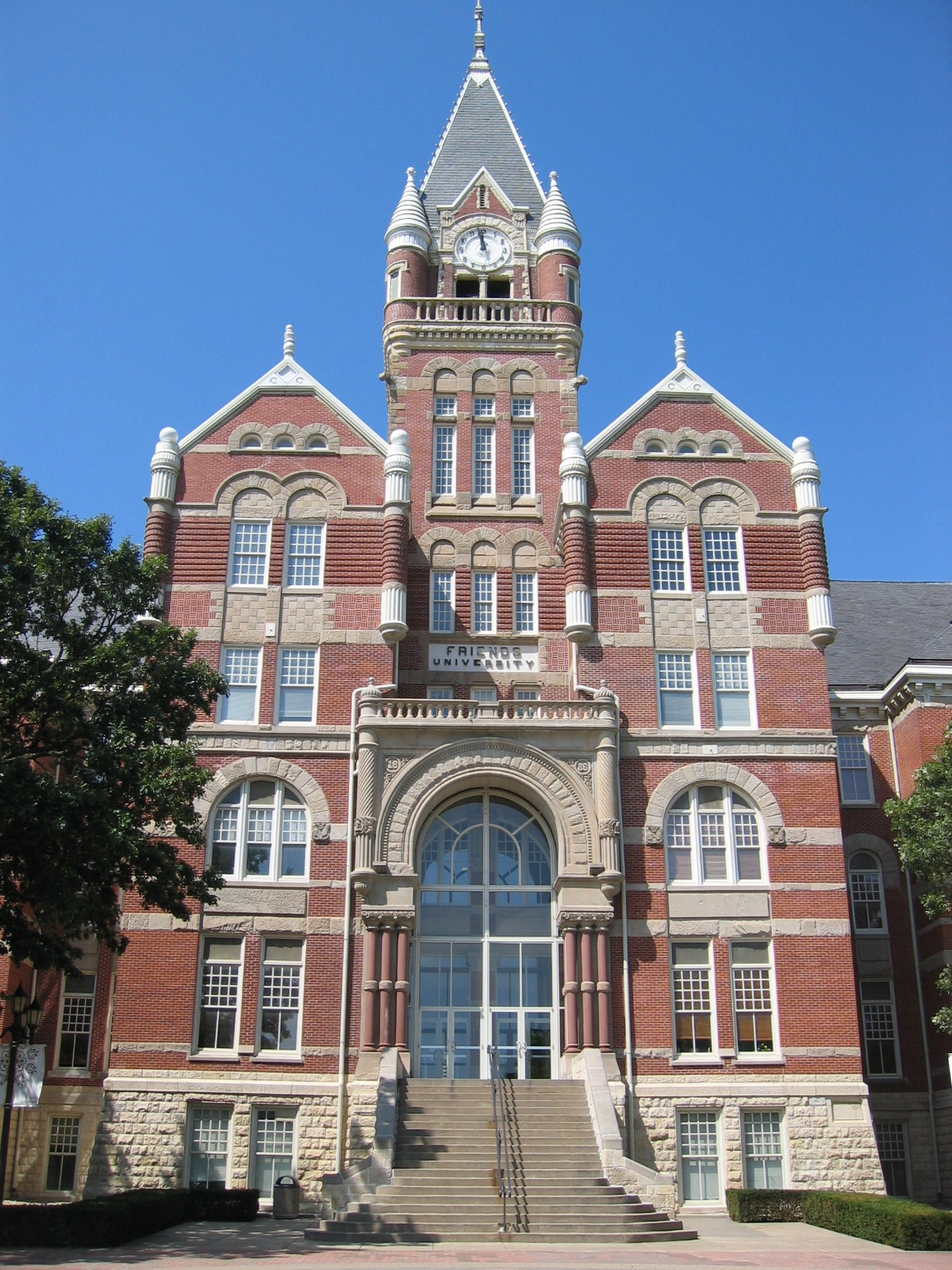
Davis Administration Building

Friends grants a wide range of degrees through the College of Business, Arts, Sciences and Education (CBASE), the College of Adult and Professional Studies (Flex), and a Graduate School (GRAD).

CBASE, Friends' undergraduate school, offers degrees in Business, Education, Fine Arts, Natural Science, Technology, Engineering and Mathematics, Religion and Humanities, and Social and Behavioral Sciences. Friends offers a Bachelor of Science in Cyber Security and a Bachelor of Science in Zoo Science, both of which are rarely offered by other institutions. As well as an ABET accredited Bachelor's in Mechanical Engineering.

FLEX offers seven fully online adult bachelor's degree programs and the Graduate School offers ten Master's level degrees. Classes taught in CAPS and GRAD generally meet one night a week or online. The university also offers a Doctor of Ministry in Formation and Soul Care.

== Athletics ==
The Friends athletic teams are called the Falcons. The university is a member of the National Association of Intercollegiate Athletics (NAIA), primarily competing in the Kansas Collegiate Athletic Conference (KCAC) since the 1953–54 academic year; which they were a member on a previous stint from 1902–03 to December 1928 (of the 1928–29 school year).

Friends competes in 23 intercollegiate varsity sports. Men's sports include baseball, basketball, cross country, football, golf, powerlifting, soccer, tennis, track & field (indoor and outdoor) and wrestling; women's sports include basketball, cross country, competitive cheerleading (coed), dance (coed) golf, powerlifting, soccer, softball, tennis, track & field (indoor and outdoor), volleyball and wrestling.

== Notable people ==
- Page Belcher, former member of Congress from Oklahoma
- Bruce Blake, bishop of the United Methodist Church and former president of Southwestern College
- R. C. Buford, general manager of San Antonio Spurs
- James Crow, population geneticist
- George Kelly, founder of clinical psychology and personal construct psychology
- Lane Lord, women's basketball coach at Pittsburg State University (2007–present)
- Matt Lundy, former Democratic member of the Ohio House of Representatives of the 57th district
- Mitch McVicker, Christian singer and songwriter
- Vern Miller, sheriff of Sedgwick County, Kansas, and Kansas Attorney General
- Rich Mullins, Christian singer and songwriter
- Darrel Ray, writer and speaker on leadership and organizational development
- Vernon Smith, Nobel Memorial Prize winner in economics
- André J. Thomas, musician and composer, professor of music at the College of Music at Florida State University and the artistic director for the Tallahassee Community Chorus
- Antwan Wilson, former superintendent of Oakland Unified School District and former chancellor of District of Columbia Public Schools
- Mary Chawner Woody, president of the North Carolina Woman's Christian Temperance Union
