= Amethod Public Schools =

Coordinates: 37.801801°N 122.26947°W

- Oakland, California; United States

Information
- Type: Nonprofit charter school system
- Established: 1993

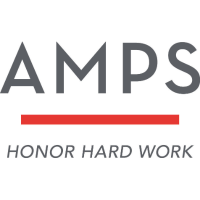
Amethod Public Schools Logo (AMPS)

Amethod Public Schools (formerly Oakland Charter Academy Inc., doing business as Oakland Charter Academies) is a nonprofit charter school system with headquarters in Oakland, California. The system operates Oakland Charter Academy (OCA) (Oakland's first charter school), Oakland Charter High School (OCHS), Downtown Charter Academy (DCA), Richmond Charter Academy (RCA) Benito Juarez Elementary School and John Henry High School, the latter three based in Richmond.

== History ==
The system began in 1993. In the fall 1993 the first school opened, originally as Jingletown Charter School. It was the first charter school in Oakland and one of the first in California. Originally it had the test scores amongst the lowest in the state. Since then the school changed its name to Oakland Charter Academy.

In 2004 Jorge Lopez took control of the school. At the time its Academic Performance Index (API) was 650. Lopez received guidance from Ben Chavis, head of the American Indian Model Schools, and established a system similar to the system of American Indian Public Charter School at Oakland Charter Academy. In late September 2007 the Oakland Charter Academy became the second public school in Oakland to win the National Blue Ribbon award. Oakland Charter High School opened in 2007.

Amethod Public Schools was created in 2009 as the branding of a new Charter Management Organization and a foundational split between the OCA and APCS campuses. The school staff set out to distinguish itself as an innovative lab for school and community redesign.

In Spring 2008 the Oakland Charter Academy received an Academic Performance Index (API) of 902. Its student body was mostly Hispanic/Latino, and the API was over 200 points higher than the average API of Latino and Hispanic middle school students in California. The Oakland Charter Academy API was over 200 points above the overall scores of all of the middle schools in Oakland.

== Campuses ==
Oakland Charter Academy, a middle school and the flagship school of Amethod Public Schools, is located in the Fruitvale District of East Oakland, CA. The second middle school location, Downtown Charter Academy, is located in 2000 Dennison Street Oakland, CA, while Oakland Charter High School is located in Downtown Oakland.

Oakland Charter Academy was once located in a former bank on International Boulevard and 30th street. It is now located on the corner of Foothill Blvd and 42nd Street. The system also, as of 2007, has the Oakland Charter High School campus in Chinatown. Downtown Charter Academy used to be located with Oakland Charter High School but has been relocated to another location. Amethod Public Schools also operates Benito Juarez Elementary School and Richmond Charter Academy, a middle school in Richmond. Another founded school is John Henry High School which is located in Richmond.

== Operations ==
At Oakland Charter Academy every student received 120 minutes each of English and mathematics instructions. The school requires its students to attend summer school. Katy Murphy of the Oakland Tribune said the work only intensifies during so-called school holidays."

When the school first operated, the instructional language used in over half of the school day was Spanish. Almost all of its students were Black. Since then the school changed its name to Oakland Charter Academy.
