= Ben Chavis =

Ben Chavis may refer to:

- Ben Chavis (educator), American educator and controversial education reform advocate
- Benjamin Chavis (born 1948), African-American civil rights activist
