= Flunked =

- Directed by: Corey Burres
- Written by: Lauren Zammit
- Produced by: Steven Maggi
- Starring: Educators
- Narrated by: Joe Mantegna
- Distributed by: Zia Film Distributors LLC John McLean Media
- Release date: March 11, 2008
- Running time: 46 minutes
- Country: United States
- Language: English

Flunked is a 2008 documentary film conceived by and executive produced by Steven Maggi, directed by Corey Burres and narrated by actor Joe Mantegna. It explores problems in the United States public education system and reviews successful education reform solutions in both charter and public schools, letting leading educators tell their stories.

== Synopsis ==
Flunked studies the relatively poor position of the United States public education system; in the 2015 Programme for International Student Assessment, the country's mean performance was merely average among the OECD member states tested, and according to a 2015 survey of members of the American Association for the Advancement of Science, just 16% of them called American K-12 STEM education above average or best. The film also, though, explores some of the system's successes.

The first 20 minutes review many of the system's problems, as well as schools nationwide that prepared students well for college in the 2000s. Based on their high test scores, their graduates seemed capable of working and competing in tomorrow's economy. The documentary shows ways to reform troubled public schools, as well as alternatives to them, including charter schools.

== Cast ==
- Jim Anderson
- Steve Barr (Green Dot Public Schools)
- Ben Chavis (American Indian Public Charter School, Oakland, CA)
- Bill Cosby
- Andrew Coulson
- Eric Dominguez
- Heidi Dominguez
- Angie Dorman
- Bill Gates
- Donn Harris
- Lynn Harsh
- Guilbert Hentschke
- Bob Herbold
- Charlie Hoff
- Therese Holliday
- Karen Jones
- Jeff Kropf
- Howard Lappin
- Steven Maggi
- Joe Mantegna, narrator
- John Merrifield
- Dan Nicklay
- Dennis Pantano
- Bill Proser
- David Scortt
- Jason Singer
- Caitlyn Snaring
- Traci Snaring
- Matt Sween
- Matt Wingard

== Reception ==
Flunked won Best Documentary at the San Fernando Valley International Film Festival in Los Angeles, Best Educational Documentary at the Bayou City Inspirational Film Festival in Houston, the Award of Merit from the Accolade Competition, and the first ever SPNovation Award.
