= Oakland Charter High School =

Location
- 2433 Coolidge Avenue; Oakland, California 94601; United States; 37°47′11″N 122°13′10″W

Information
- Type: Charter high school
- Motto: Honor Hard Work
- Established: 2007
- Founder: Amethod Public Schools
- Closed: June 30, 2025
- School district: Oakland Unified School District
- NCES School ID: 062805012041
- Principal: Malcolm McArthur
- Grades: 9 to 12
- Enrollment: 359 (June 2025)
- Color: Black/Yellow
- Mascot: Matador
- Website: ochs.amethodschools.org

Oakland Charter High School was a charter school in Oakland, California serving high school students, part of Amethod Public Schools. It was established in 2007 and closed in 2025.

== History ==
Oakland Charter High School was established in 2007, the second in the Amethod Public Schools charter school group, and was authorized by the Oakland Unified School District. It was housed together with Amethod's Oakland Charter Academy at 345 and 301 12th Street in downtown Oakland.

In 2010–2011 the school had 121 students. In the 2019–2020 school year, the school had 461 students; in 2025, enrollment was 359.

In 2016, soil and air testing revealed high levels of trichloroethylene at the 12th Street location; 301 12th Street had formerly been an auto shop. The school relocated for the 2017–18 school year; as of 2025 its address was 2433 Coolidge Avenue.

In January 2025, Oakland Charter High School was denied reauthorization by the Oakland Unified School District. Amethod appealed to the Alameda County Board of Education, which denied the appeal in April 2025, and the school closed on June 30, 2025 when its authorization expired. Approximately 38% of the students enrolled in Oakland Unified School District schools for the following school year.

== Academics and athletics ==
The California Department of Education named Oakland Charter High School a California Distinguished School in 2012. Students scored a 961 on the Academic Performance Index in 2010 and 938 in 2011, results that exceeded those of other Oakland high schools except American Indian Public High School and ranking among the top high schools in California. In 2016, GreatSchools ranked it first on its list of the best 15 San Francisco Bay Area high schools for students from low-income families, citing a graduation rate of 85% and a 91% rate of meeting eligibity requirements for California public universities. In 2020, U.S. News & World Report ranked the school 31st among California high schools. In 2023, it was ranked 71st, and in 2025, it was ranked 181st.

The school mascot was the matador; sports teams played in black and yellow.
