= Zum (company) =

American student transportation service provider

- Formerly: Liftee (2015–2016)
- Type: Private
- Industry: Transportation; Educational technology
- Founded: 2015; 11 years ago in Redwood City, California
- Founders: Ritu Narayan; Vivek Garg; Abhishek Garg
- Headquarters: Redwood City, California, United States
- Area served: United States
- Key people: Ritu Narayan (CEO)
- Products: Zum platform Zum CMX
- Services: Student transportation School bus services Fleet management Vehicle-to-grid energy
- Website: ridezum.com

Zum Services, Inc., stylized as Zūm, is an American student transportation services company headquartered in Redwood City, California, U.S. It provides contract transportation services to school districts across the United States.

== History ==
Zum was founded in 2015 by Ritu Narayan, Vivek Garg and Abhishek Garg, initially operating under the name Liftee. Narayan, a former product manager at eBay and Oracle, was inspired by her own experiences as a working mother and by her mother's career sacrifices in India. The service was initially modeled after ridesharing platforms, offering parents an app to schedule vetted drivers to transport their children to school and after-school activities. The company was renamed from Liftee to Zum in January 2016. Zum began its operations in California in early 2016.

In August 2017, Zum raised $5.5 million in a Series A funding round led by Sequoia Capital. A $19 million Series B round followed in March 2018. In February 2019, BMW i Ventures invested as part of a $40 million investment round in the company to expand its operations outside California. Previously, it received $19 million in a Series B round in 2018 and $5.5 million in a Series A round in 2017.

In July 2019, Zum entered into a $150 million contract with the San Francisco Unified Schools District to operate the transportation system in the district.

In February 2020, Zum began a partnership with Oakland Unified School District (OUSD) to provide transportation services to its students. In August 2024, OUSD introduced the first all-electric school bus fleet in the United States.

In July 2021, Zum was awarded a five-year contract valued at $150 million by the San Francisco Unified School District (SFUSD). In October 2021, Zum raised $130 million in Series D funding led by SoftBank Vision Fund 2, with participation from existing investors including Sequoia Capital and BMW i Ventures, at a valuation of $930 million. The funds were used to expand the company's footprint to new areas and expand its fleet, including adding new electric vehicles.

In June 2022, Zum received a contract from the Los Angeles Unified School District (LAUSD), the second-largest school district in the United States, valued at more than $400 million, replacing previous provider First Student. In July 2022, the Seattle School Board awarded Zum a three-year contract valued at $68 million to modernize school bus services for Seattle Public Schools.

In March 2023, the Spokane Public Schools Board of Directors awarded Zum a five-year contract valued at $71.8 million, replacing longtime provider Durham School Services. In June 2023, Zum signed a three-year, $27 million contract with the Howard County Public School System (HCPSS) in Maryland to operate roughly half of the district's bus routes. During the opening weeks of the 2023-24 school year, Howard County Public Schools experienced widespread transportation disruptions following the transition to Zum. More than 100 routes were delayed or canceled during the first several days of school because of driver shortages, incomplete staffing, and operational challenges. The company subsequently flew approximately 70 drivers from Washington state and Seattle to help cover routes.The transportation issues prompted significant public criticism, multiple school board meetings, and an independent operational audit commissioned by the district.

In January 2024, Zum raised $140 million in a Series E funding round led by GIC, the Singapore sovereign wealth fund, with participation from Climate Investment, Sequoia, and SoftBank Vision Fund 2, valuing the company at $1.3 billion and bringing total funding to $350 million. In August 2024, Zum deployed an all-electric fleet of 74 school buses with bidirectional chargers in the Oakland Unified School District, making it the first major school district in the United States to transition to fully electric school bus system.

In February 2025, Zum and Saint Louis Public Schools began a joint initiative to modernize student transportation in St. Louis.

In April 2026, Howard County Public Schools and Zum signed a five-year, $120 million contract extension running through June 2031.

== Controversies ==
=== Howard County Public Schools ===
Following the implementation of Zūm's contract with the Howard County Public School System (HCPSS) for the 2023–24 school year, the district experienced widespread transportation disruptions during the opening weeks of school. Driver shortages, route changes, and operational issues resulted in dozens of canceled routes, delayed pickups, and thousands of students arriving late to school. To address staffing shortages, the company flew approximately 70 drivers from Washington state to Maryland to assist with operations.

In 2024, Howard County commissioned an independent audit of the transportation transition. The report concluded that multiple factors contributed to the rollout challenges, including inadequate planning, staffing shortages, compressed implementation timelines, and insufficient coordination between the district and Zūm. The audit stated that both parties underestimated the complexity of transitioning transportation services at the scale required by the district.

Despite the initial challenges, Howard County Public Schools approved a five-year contract extension with Zūm in April 2026 after district officials reported improvements in transportation performance.

== Employment litigation ==
In 2026, a former Zūm employee filed a federal wrongful termination lawsuit in the United States District Court for the Western District of Virginia. The complaint alleges the employee was terminated after raising concerns regarding company practices. Zūm has denied the allegations, and the litigation remains pending.

The lawsuit received coverage in multiple regional publications because of Zūm's role providing student transportation services to school districts across the United States.
