= Antwan Wilson =

American teacher and school administrator

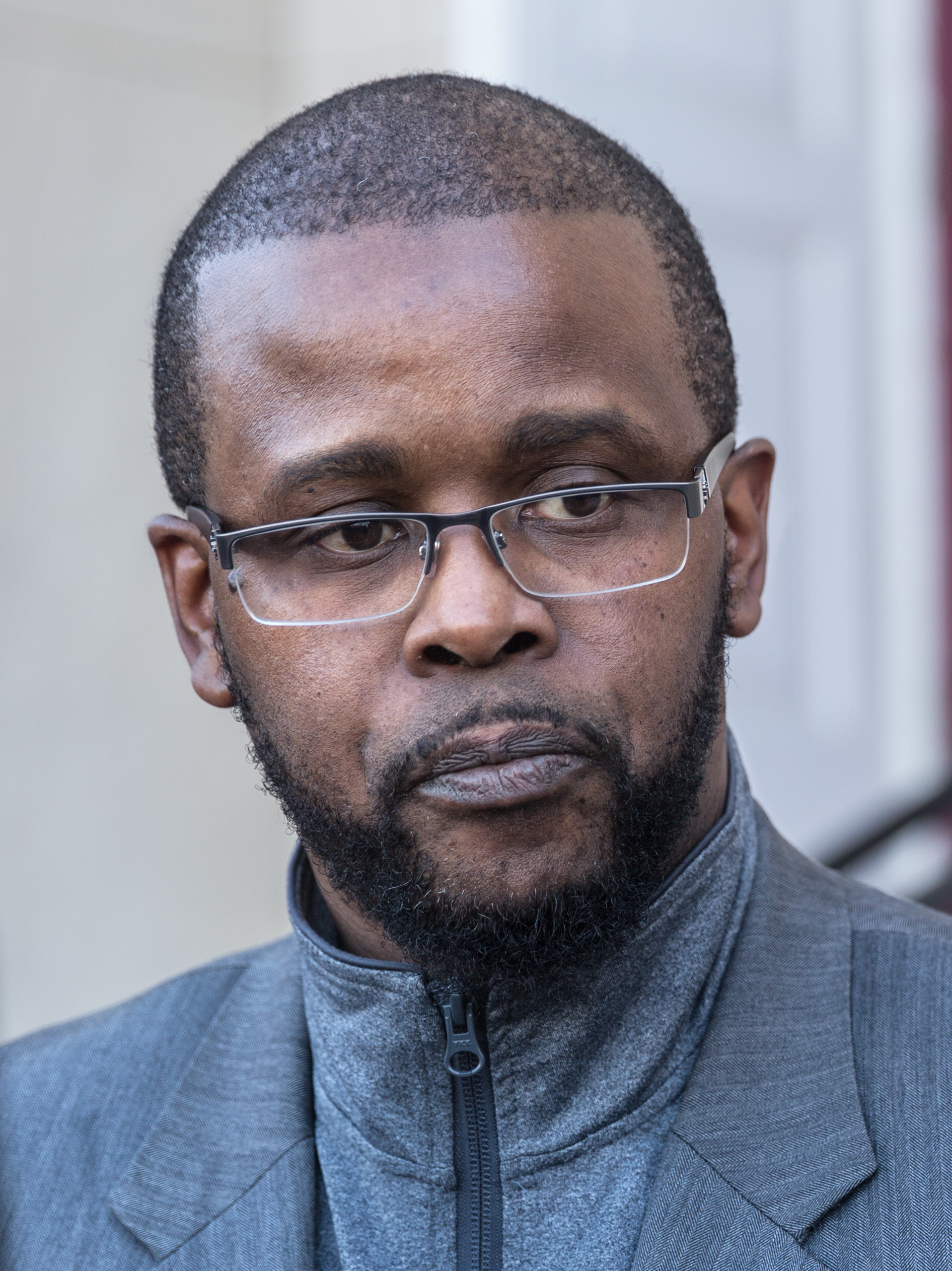

Chancellor of District of Columbia Public Schools
- In office February 1, 2017 – February 20, 2018
- Preceded by: John Davis (interim)
- Succeeded by: Amanda Alexander (interim)

Superintendent of Oakland Unified School District
- In office June 2014 – February 2017
- Preceded by: Gary Yee
- Succeeded by: Devin Dillon (acting)

Personal details
- Born: 1972 (age 52–53) Wichita, Kansas, U.S.
- Spouse: Theresa
- Children: 3
- Education: Nebraska Wesleyan University (1995, BA); Friends University (2000, MA)

Antwan Wilson (born 1972) is an American teacher and school administrator. He was appointed the Superintendent of the Oakland Unified School District in Oakland, California, in 2014, and resigned effective February 2017. On December 20, 2016, he was confirmed as Chancellor of the District of Columbia Public Schools in Washington, D.C. He began his new position on February 1, 2017.

Wilson resigned as DCPS chancellor on February 20, 2018, after media reports that he had bypassed the school system's lottery process to win a place at a prestigious school for one of his children.

== Early life and education ==
Wilson was born in Wichita, Kansas, about 1972. He has one younger brother and one younger sister. He grew up in Wichita and in Lincoln, Nebraska, and for most of this time his mother was single. The family was very poor, and Wilson's mother had to work several jobs to support her children. He often lived in areas where drug use and drug dealing, violence, and gangs were common.

Antwan was, by his own admission, shy and somewhat insecure as a child. He attended local public schools in Wichita and Lincoln, and the family moved frequently so that the Wilson children could attend better schools. He graduated from Lincoln High School (where he was one of only a handful of minority students in upper-level classes).

Wilson's mother broke her back in a workplace injury when he was a senior in high school. He decided to attend college at a local institution of higher learning so that he could remain at home and assist with her recovery while getting a degree. He attended Nebraska Wesleyan University, where he received a Bachelor of Arts degree in history-social science education. Wilson entered college intending to be a pre-law major, with the goal of attending law school and becoming a civil rights attorney. But in his sophomore year, he and a close friend began discussing how education plays a role in ending poverty and racism. During spring break, they traveled to Chicago, Illinois, where they observed the classroom teaching style of Linda Murray, an award-winning educator at Hyde Park Career Academy. Wilson began adding education classes, and in time switched his major.

In 2000, Wilson received his master's degree in educational leadership from Friends University in Wichita.

Wilson graduated in 2014, from Broad Superintendents Academy, an unaccredited private certification program established by billionaire Eli Broad to train urban educational administrators in leadership skills.

== Early career ==
=== Wichita and Lincoln ===
After graduation, Wilson resolved to teach for at least five years. He spent a year teaching in Raleigh, North Carolina, and then three years teaching at a high school in Wichita. He also coached basketball and track. In 1999, Wilson accepted a job as an assistant principal at Lincoln High School in Lincoln, Nebraska, but left after a year to take a position as assistant principal at Wichita South High School. Wilson was appointed principal at Wichita's Pleasant Valley Middle School. Wilson adopted the motto "Success for all. No excuses." during his time at Pleasant Valley, and implemented a number of programs for students, faculty, and parents to boost attendance, reduce discipline problems, and improve learning.

=== Denver ===
In 2005, Wilson accepted a position as principal at Montbello High School in Denver, Colorado. The school, which opened in 1980, in a poverty- and violence-ridden area of the city, had the nickname "Mont-ghetto". Students at Montbello had struggled to do well, and attendance, graduation rates, and state test scores were all low. Discipline problems were rife at the school, and teacher turnover was high. Wilson initially implemented a program of strict discipline, in which students were not allowed to skip classes, hang out in hallways, or form large groups in hallways. Students who did not turn in assignments were required to spend part of their lunch time doing homework, and suspensions were largely replaced with in-school detention combined with intense academic work. Later, Wilson encouraged faculty to focus on teaching basic skills, improving critical thinking, and using a more interactive teaching approach. This included building community spirit at Montbello as well as extensive assessment. Testing was viewed as a means of identifying what skills and knowledge needed to be taught, rather than as a way of seeing which students were not achieving. State test scores improved and suspensions decreased during Wilson's tenure at Montbello.

In 2008, Wilson was appointed High School Instructional Superintendent for the Denver Public Schools. A year later, he was promoted to Assistant Superintendent for Post-Secondary Readiness. During his tenure as assistant superintendent, Wilson co-founded a program titled "Denver Summit Schools" that targeted the school district's 11 worst-performing schools. Each school received a theme (such an international studies or culinary arts), assistance with discipline and behavioral issues, and began offering Advanced Placement courses. Teachers received new instructional training and additional support. Enrollment at the schools soared, the dropout rate fell by 60 percent, and test scores rose (most significantly for racial minorities).

== Oakland ==
In 2014, Wilson was named the superintendent of the Oakland Unified School District in Oakland, California. He succeeded Dr. Gary Yee, the acting superintendent. (Note: Oakland schools superintendent Tony Smith resigned suddenly in April 2013 after four years leading the district, citing family health issues.) His reputation for turning around low-performing schools in Denver attracted him to the Oakland search committee. Wilson was selected from a pool of 20 candidates, five of which were finalists for the position. The school board voted to hire him unanimously. He was given a four-year contract, with a start date of July 1, 2014.

=== Initiatives ===
While working in Oakland, Wilson implemented several administrative changes. He established a new teacher and leader evaluation system, and improved each school's autonomy regarding staffing and the adoption of teaching innovations. Wilson centralized other operations, particularly in the area of finance. This allowed the district to close its books and complete a financial audit for the first time in a decade. This led to a significant improvement in the school district's credit rating, which led to savings on interest rates and freed money for new spending. Wilson also began sending more money to each local school, and spending less on central administration. Wilson also hired Lance Jackson, chief operating officer for SGI Construction Management, to act as the school district's interim facilities manager in order to fill a position which had been empty for several years.

As he did as assistant superintendent in Denver, Wilson focused a good deal of attention on the worst-performing schools. He implemented a program at the five most troubled schools, replacing their principals, revamping the curriculum, and adding enrichment and extracurricular activities (such as art, choir, and speech and debate). He also collaborated with a wide range of public education stakeholders to create "Oakland Promise", an initiative to triple in 10 years the number of Oakland public school students successfully entering college. The program won national attention. Another of Wilson's emphases as superintendent was a commitment to social-emotional learning.

Wilson also worked to integrate Oakland's charter schools more closely with the public school system. In 2015, Wilson began an initiative to have the charter schools and public schools adopt the same curriculum, teaching methods, staff development, and administrative procedures. The following year, Wilson attempted to require use of a single form for parents to use when applying for their child's enrollment at a public school or charter school. (Note: The Oakland school district approved its first charter school in 1993. About 25 percent of Oakland's public school students attend city charter schools, while another 25 percent attend a school outside the city.) His goal was to eliminate cherry picking by charter schools, and make charter school admissions more transparent.

Under Wilson, the Oakland school district also negotiated a new collective bargaining agreement with its teacher and education paraprofessional unions in 2016. It was the first time since 2009 that the two sides had been able to reach an agreement.

=== Criticisms ===
Wilson's tenure in Oakland was described as "rocky" by the press. His low-performing school reconstitution initiative proved controversial. The single-form initiative for charter and public school enrollment was strongly opposed by some teachers and parents, who saw it as an attempt to turn public schools into charter schools. Some parents felt this would segregate African American students into the lowest-performing public schools, and drain public schools of much-needed funds. Several people claimed Wilson was "the face of new Jim Crow" an "Uncle Tom", and a stooge of "corporate oligarchy". Parents of special needs students accused Wilson of attempting to mainstream their children without providing adequate personnel or funds to mainstream teachers, thereby harming their children's health and education. Wilson's certification by the Broad Superintendents Academy generated controversy as well, for his critics felt that Wilson now advocated Eli Broad's plan to close all but the top-performing public schools and transform the education system into charter schools. (Note: Wilson was the first Broad-educated superintendent in the nation to be hired by a school board which had once been the subject of a takeover by a state.) Although some members of the Oakland school board, the city's teachers' union, and some community groups criticized Wilson for moving too fast and ignoring community concerns. Wilson's decision to hire Jackson as interim facilities director also was criticized for creating a conflict of interest, as SGI Construction Management also oversaw the school district's construction program.

The use of racist epithets and the level of anger toward Wilson became so bad that African American clergy and local NAACP officials began appearing at school board meetings to help keep calm, encourage civility, and defend (to some degree) Wilson. The strength of the public attacks on Wilson declined afterward.

Despite the criticisms, a large bloc of school board members gave Wilson their vocal and constant support during his tenure in the city.

Wilson was strongly criticized for leaving the school district with a $30 million budget deficit. The deficit, made public just a month before his departure, was caused by rapid expansion in programs, cost overruns in existing programs, and a $10 million loss in state funding due to lower enrollment, among other factors. Wilson defended the budget, arguing that he had balanced OUSD's budget every year in the past, and that asking for full funding of programs and making cuts later was a normal part of the budget process.

== Washington, D.C. ==
On November 21, 2016, Washington, D.C., Mayor Muriel Bowser nominated Wilson to be the Chancellor of the District of Columbia Public Schools. (Note: The District of Columbia uses a single enrollment form for public and charter schools, similar to the one Wilson attempted to implement in Oakland.) Bowser said Wilson was a "proven manager" who "was bold and strategic and open and transparent". She highlighted Wilson's ability to bring fiscal stability to the school district. Wilson announced the same day that he was resigning as superintendent of the Oakland school district, effective in February 2017. Wilson's nomination required approval by the Council of the District of Columbia. DCPS analyst Mary Levy later noted that Bowser had provided "no public information" about the process she used to identify potential candidates, nor who she had considered.

At a confirmation hearing on December 7, 2016, the D.C. city council questioned Wilson about how he would approach problems faced by the city schools. Wilson advocated longer school days, tutoring, and other resources for struggling children. He also promoted more extracurricular activities for middle schoolers. Some individuals and groups voiced concern over his nomination, arguing that his programs have been only moderately successful in Denver and Oakland. His nomination was unanimously confirmed by the council on December 20, and his first day on the job was February 1, 2017.

In November 2017, The Washington Post reported that Wilson had left the Oakland public school system in an unresolved financial crisis. Wilson, the newspaper said, had downplayed Oakland's $30 million budget deficit to D.C. officials and the public. Carmelita Reyes, principal of Oakland International High School, co-chair of Oakland's Principals Advisory Committee, and a member of the Oakland School District Budget Advisory Committee, said that shortly after Wilson announced his resignation, all school district budgets in Oakland were frozen due to the emerging financial crisis. The Post disclosed that:

- Wilson hired dozens of new executive staff, created new positions and departments that were not budgeted, and paid these individuals more than usual salary offered by the Oakland school district.
- In his last year in office in Oakland, Wilson overspent his budget for classified supervisors and administrators by $11.8 million (more than double what was budgeted), and his budget for professional and consulting services by $6.8 million (almost a third more than what was budgeted).
- During the two-and-a-half years Wilson was employed as Oakland superintendent, the Oakland school district chronically underspent the budget for books and classroom supplies. In the 2015–2016 school year, only $12.3 million was spent (about a third less than budgeted), and the spending dropped to just $6.8 million in the 2016–2017 school year (two-thirds less than budgeted).
- In a potential conflict of interest, Wilson hired the head of a consulting firm which was already doing business for the Oakland school district. This individual was paid $30,000 a month.
- The Wilson administration in Oakland overestimated the number of students it would enroll for the 2016–2017 school year. When the actual enrollment numbers came in low, the school district should have laid off several dozen teachers. It declined to do so, which cost the district $3.2 million.

The fiscal crisis in Oakland was so severe, that on August 15, 2017, the state-run Fiscal Crisis and Management Assistance Team (FCMAT, which assists the district in managing its affairs), said the Oakland public school district had "lost control of its spending, [and] allow[ed] school sites and departments to ignore and override board policies by spending beyond their budgets." FCMAT also concluded that during Wilson's tenure as superintendent, "this behavior has permeated to the site administration, causing a lack of consistency in appropriate site size, staffing, class offerings and budgets." Auditors for the state of California concluded in another report that, under Wilson, the Oakland school district had "lost control of its spending". On November 8, 2015, the Oakland Board of Education ordered $15.1 million in emergency budget cuts, even though the budget had already been significantly cut earlier in the year.

Both Superintendent Wilson and Mayor Bowser declined to comment on the Oakland crisis when questioned by the media in late November 2017. Principal Reyes said that the school board shared responsibility with Wilson for budget overruns, excessive new supervisory hires, excessive salaries, and the lack of both software and staff to oversee spending. The Washington Post noted that most D.C. school system observers had "no firm opinions" about Wilson's tenure in the District of Columbia.

=== Resignation ===
In April 2017, local news media reported that several D.C. government and DCPS officials had won special permission to transfer their children to other schools without going through the admissions lottery. Any student seeking to enroll at a school outside their assigned school boundary must enter this lottery (although some exceptions for discretionary transfers exist), which ensures fairness in awarding positions. These special permissions had been granted by Wilson's predecessor, Kaya Henderson. In the summer of 2017, Wilson established a new policy prohibiting the DCPS chancellor from granting non-lottery admissions without following the exceptions procedures.

On February 16, 2018, Wilson admitted in an interview with WAMU, a local public radio station, that he asked then-Deputy Mayor for Education Jennifer Niles (Note: Mayor Bowser asked for and received Niles' resignation on February 16, hours after the scandal broke.) to exempt his daughter from the admissions lottery and immediately transfer her from Duke Ellington School of the Arts (where she was having personal and academic problems) to Woodrow Wilson High School. The request was granted.

A wide range of public and private individuals called for Wilson's resignation. Wilson initially refused. By Tuesday morning, February 20, seven of the 13 members of the D.C. Council had joined the call for Wilson's resignation. Mayor Muriel Bowser placed Wilson on administrative leave and asked for his resignation. Wilson resigned, effectively immediately, later that afternoon.

Dr. Amanda Alexander, head of the DCPS Office of Elementary Schools, was appointed interim chancellor.

Wilson's contract potentially provides for severance pay and an in-lieu salary payout. Mayor Bowser said these financial arrangements will be negotiated by the school district and Wilson shortly.

== Professional organizations ==
While superintendent in Oakland, Wilson joined the National Commission on Social, Emotional, and Academic Development (Note: The group of education leaders and researchers conducts research into ways to teach social and emotional skills to students, and develops programs to help school districts implement social-emotional learning into the curriculum.) and Chiefs for Change. (Note: Chiefs for Change, founded by former Florida Governor Jeb Bush, is a national education group founded in 2010 that has advocated for school choice, the adoption of Common Core Standards, full funding for the Every Student Succeeds Act, improved teacher and staff development, and more.) He is listed as an advisor to Code.org, the educational platform that runs the popular Hour of Code program.

== Personal life ==
Wilson married his wife, Tresa (also an educator), while working in Wichita from 2000 to 2003. The couple had a daughter, and twin daughters.

Wilson is known for waking every day at 3 A.M. to exercise, meditate, and prepare for the day. His role models include his mother; his mentor and former teacher, Tim Carroll; Barack and Michelle Obama; football coach Vince Lombardi; and former basketball player Magic Johnson.
