= Mitchell Landsberg =

American journalist and newspaper editor (born 1953)

Mitchell Landsberg is an American journalist and newspaper editor. He is the senior editor for enterprise of the Los Angeles Times, and was previously a foreign and national editor.

Landsberg was born November 1, 1953, in Sacramento, California, and he received a bachelor's degree in history from UCLA in 1976.

After graduation, he worked at the Beverly Hills Independent and the Ukiah Daily Journal. In 1980 he went to work for the Associated Press, where he was a reporter, editor, and foreign correspondent for 19 years, moving to the Times in 1999. At the Times he reported on local and national politics, including coverage of the 2000 Florida recount, the 2003 California gubernatorial recall election, and the 2010 Haiti earthquake.

Landsberg was one of three journalists cited by name when the 2004 Pulitzer Prize for Breaking News Reporting was given to the Los Angeles Times, for "compelling and comprehensive coverage of the massive wildfires that imperiled a populated region of southern California." He was the lead writer for a 70-member team covering the fire stories, and the next year, his reporting contributed to the newspaper's winning of the 2005 Pulitzer Prize for Public Service. He and three other reporters were credited for a "courageous, exhaustively researched series exposing deadly medical problems and racial injustice at a major public hospital", the King/Drew Medical Center.
