= Association des sociologues enseignants du supérieur =

L'Association des sociologues enseignants du supérieur (ASES) is a French association organised on January 11, 1989 by two French sociologists, Catherine and Pierre Paradeise Tripier, to ensure "the defense and promotion of sociology in higher education". Its articles of association were published on May 26, 1989.

ASES serves as a forum for reflection on teaching and research in sociology and demography, as well as academic hiring and career development in these disciplines. In 2001, it participated in organizing debates and a petition against the awarding of a thesis to Élizabeth Teissier. In 2009, it participated in the protest against the self-promotions to professorship within section 19 of the Conseil National des Universités (CNU).

Its past presidents were all French sociologists: Catherine Paradeise, Pierre Tripier, Maryse Tripier, Bruno Péquignot, Philippe Cibois, Daniel Filâtre, Régine Bercot and Charles Gadéa.
