= American Indian Public High School =

Location
- 746 Grand Ave; Oakland, California; United States; 37.793733°N 122.199356°W

Information
- Type: Public charter
- Established: 2006
- Faculty: 15
- Grades: 9-12
- Website: American Indian Public High School website

American Indian Public High School (AIPHS) is a charter school in Oakland, California (USA) and is part of the American Indian Model Schools charter school system. In 2011, the school ranked fourth in California in the Academic Performance Index (API). American Indian Public High School ranked first on a list in The Washington Post of the most challenging high schools in the United States. Approximately 77 percent of the school's students are from low-income households. It was ranked the 9th best charter school in the U.S. and the 38th best public high school in the U.S. by U.S. News & World Report in 2013. In 2024, U.S. News & World Report ranked AIPHS 1,482nd best high school and 207th best charter school in the U.S.
