= Ben Chavis (educator) =

American educator

Doctor Ben Chavis
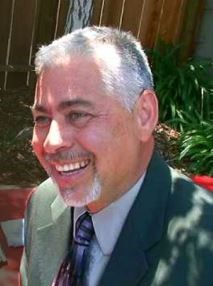
- Born: Benford Ben Chavis; Robeson County, North Carolina
- Education: Oklahoma City University; University of Arizona; Northern Arizona University
- Occupation: Educator
- Years active: 1988- present
- Organization(s): San Francisco State University; American Indian Public Charter School
- Known for: American Indian Model Schools
- Spouse: Maggie Gopp

Benford Chavis is an American educator known for his leadership at the American Indian Public Charter School (AIPCS) in Oakland, California, and its expanded American Indian Model Schools system, serving from 2001 into 2012. He is a national leader in the education reform movement, emphasizing a conservative philosophy of discipline and accountability. From Robeson County, North Carolina, Chavis received a doctorate in education from the University of Arizona, was a tenure-track professor in 1988 at San Francisco State University, and he served as the superintendent of schools at the Fort Apache Indian Reservation in Arizona before working in Oakland.

Chavis was appointed as the principal of AIPCS in 2000 when the school was "among the worst middle schools in Oakland, Calif" suffering from "highest dropout rate and lowest attendance and graduation rates of any ethnic group in the city". The school made considerable improvements under Dr. Chavis and was named in 2006 as one of the top 250 schools in the US. In 2008 it ranked fifth among all the 1300 odd middle schools in California in terms of academic performance index. It then moved to the #1 position in 2010. Though the school made remarkable improvements under Chavis, at the same time this success attracted controversy primarily for the methods he used on the students to keep them performing well. In 2012, Fiscal Crisis and Management Assistance Team submitted a report alleging Chavis had been involved in mismanagement of school funds. After seven years of federal investigation, all financial mismanagement charges against Chavis were dropped in 2019.

Chavis was featured in the documentary film Flunked (2008). He is the co-author of Crazy Like a Fox: One Principal's Triumph in the Inner City (2009).

== Early life and education ==
Born Benford Chavis, the eldest of six children in a poor Lumbee family in Robeson County, North Carolina, he was soon called "Ben", a nickname he has used all his life. He had a difficult relationship with his alcoholic father, who died when he was young. His mother remarried. None of his parents had much formal education, but Chavis said his stepfather taught him discipline, how to work hard and be accountable—a philosophy he applied as an educator.

Chavis attended local segregated public schools, where he was most interested in sports. He accepted a track scholarship from Oklahoma City University. Two years in, he was offered an academic scholarship by the University of Arizona, and transferred there, majoring in education. At the time, he thought the field would offer easy conditions. He graduated with a bachelor's degree in education; he had worked part-time as a school janitor to help pay for it. Chavis continued his studies, pursuing a master's degree through night classes at Northern Arizona University. In 1986 he completed a doctorate at the University of Arizona, in education, with what he said were concentrations in philosophy and anthropology. His dissertation was on teacher-student relationships as perceived by Lumbee Indians.

== Career ==
In 1988, Chavis became a tenure-track professor in the ethnic studies department at San Francisco State University. In 2000, he was working as superintendent of schools at the Fort Apache Indian Reservation in Arizona.

That year he was recruited by a representative of Oakland's Native American community for the position of principal at the struggling American Indian Public Charter School in Oakland, starting in 2001. By 2005, he had succeeded in dramatically raising scores of the middle school students and increasing enrollment at the school.

Chavis had generated considerable controversy by his methods. He was criticized by some parents and faculty for harsh treatment and verbal abuse of students and teachers. Chavis zealously mocked liberal orthodoxy and was praised by conservatives such as columnist George Will and Andrew Coulson of the Cato Institute. The school claimed to be just as intolerant of unions as it was of drug dealers, and prided itself on firing under-performing teachers.

He worked with the school's board in 2007 to respond to community demand for more classes, and they added another middle school, AIPCS II, and a high school, AIPHS, under a new charter organization known as the American Indian Model Schools (AIMS) system.

While Chavis stepped down as head of the schools in summer 2007, the board asked him to serve in an executive, consulting role, and he was active in the schools' affairs. A K-4 elementary school was added to AIPCS II in 2012. During these years, the AIM system student body had a growing proportion of African American, Asian and Latino students, with American Indians comprising a smaller percentage. Chavis resigned all ties in January 2012. By the 2012 school year, some 90 percent of the AIMS students were ethnic Asian. Some critics of the system attributed the high scores of the system schools to the make-up of the student body, known for a culture that demanded high performance.

Former California Governor Arnold Schwarzenegger called Chavis's results an “education miracle.”

== Reception ==
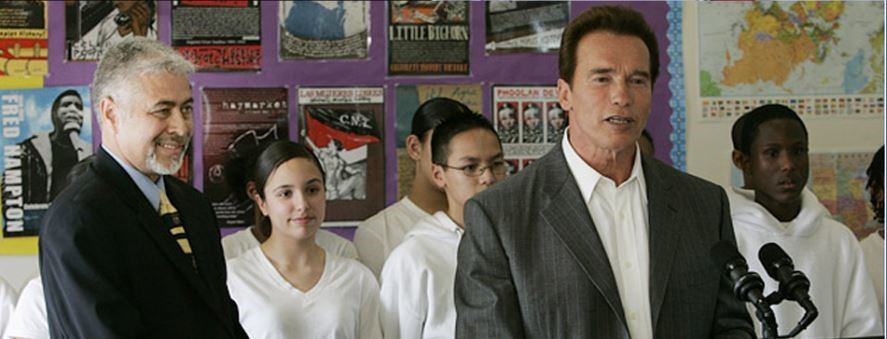
Ben Chavis with Arnold Schwarzenegger

Former California Governor Arnold Schwarzenegger said during his visit to Chavis's school in March 2006, "I have taken the tour [of American Indian Public Charter School], and I have to tell you from what I've seen I was really impressed. ... It is an education miracle that has happened here."

"Ben Chavis, the most politically incorrect person on the planet, is also, not coincidentally, one of the people most correct about inner-city education." said George F Will. Jay Mathews of The Washington Post has commented, "[Chavis] has many of the habits of some of the best educators I know - a wicked sense of humor, a weakness for shocking the conventionally wise, and a deep love of children, particularly those who have had difficult lives." These comments were made in relation to the release of the 2009 book Crazy Like a Fox: One Principal's Triumph in the Inner City by Dr. Ben Chavis with Carey Blakely.

The San Francisco Chronicle remarked, “There is much to be learned from this account. It is possible to restore public education to its mission of educating the nation’s citizens. There is a message of hope and possibility in Crazy Like a Fox that we should embrace.”

== Representation in other media ==
Chavis was among reform educators featured in the documentary Flunked (2008), directed by Corey Burres, about the failures of the United States public school systems and efforts in educational reforms. Chavis has appeared several times in the television programs hosted by John Stossel. He was also a frequently seen subject of discussion in Stossel's columns.

== Controversies ==
=== California state "extraordinary audit" ===
Chavis resigned all ties at the school system in January 2012 and returned to North Carolina, where he had been resident again for some time. After the results of an "extraordinary audit" by the California financial management system were released later in 2012, Chavis was criticized for allegedly receiving more than $3.8 million in school funds for directing school payments to his and his wife's business without authorized contracts, from 2006 to 2010. In addition, the board of the charter school system was criticized for lax accounting and financial mismanagement. Following the results of the audit and other investigations of Chavis related to treatment of students and faculty, in February 2013, OUSD revoked the school's charter. After Chavis's resignation, the school appealed the revocation and struggled for the next year to keep its charter. It gained a preliminary injunction from the Superior Court of Alameda County allowing it to continue to operate the three system schools. AIMS has since received a 5-year renewal of the charter. During the next 2 1/2 years, the charter school system paid Chavis an additional $8.6 million to lease buildings which he owned in Oakland, because it was unable to find other spaces for its operations.

In North Carolina Chavis started a camp on his property to help students improve their math scores. It was modeled on the SAIL program used in California schools.

In January 2017, he claimed to help orchestrate a change in the county's school board. He said he had encouraged the firing of Superintendent Tommy Lowery

of the Public Schools of Robeson County and the effort by six board members to hire Virginia-based educator Thomas Graves. Lowry filed a lawsuit against the board charging they had violated their own hiring policy in trying to hire Graves.[30]

=== March 2017 federal indictments ===
Chavis was indicted on March 30, 2017, by the federal government on six felony counts of money laundering and mail fraud; the case was filed in federal district court in San Francisco, California. The charges relate to his receiving federal grant money from 2006 to 2012 for the charter schools in Oakland, and his allegedly misusing the money in order to make lease payments on property he owned. The charges say that he benefited by $1.1 million on his transactions, as the schools made payments on property he owned, in what were illegal conflict-of-interest transactions. He was arrested and taken into custody in Wilmington, North Carolina.

However, as of April 2019, all financial mismanagement charges against Chavis were dropped. Chavis has pleaded guilty to an unrelated charge. The federal sentencing memo issued by U.S. District Court of Oakland said "Dr. Chavis' conduct, while a violation of federal law, did not cause measurable financial losses to the United States or another identifiable victim", though he pleaded guilty for using false information in board documents and thus was put on probation for a year and a financial fine of $100 was imposed.

== Books authored ==
- Blakely, Carey., Chavis, Ben. Crazy Like a Fox: One Principal's Triumph in the Inner City. United States: Penguin Publishing Group, 2010. ISBN 9781101532492
