= Oakland Unified School District =

School district in California, U.S.

Address
- 1011 Union Street Oakland, California 94607 United States

District information
- Type: Public
- Grades: TK–12+
- Superintendent: Denise Saddler (interim)
- Schools: 80

Students and staff
- Students: 34,000 plus 10,800 in charter schools (2024)
- Teachers: 2,357
- Student–teacher ratio: 25

Other information
- Website: www.ousd.org

Oakland Unified School District is a public education school district in Oakland, California, United States, serving a total of 44,800 students as of 2024. It operates a total of 50 elementary schools, 17 middle schools (6–8), 17 high schools (9–12), and 8 alternative education programs, which served 34,000 students in 2024, and there are also 24 district-authorized charter schools.

Located in one of California's most diverse cities, OUSD serves a diverse population of students. Nearly half of the students in district and charter schools speak a non-English language at home. For the school year 2016–17, 31 percent of OUSD students were English-language learners. OUSD also serves a large population of newcomer students. Seventy-three percent of students receive free or reduced-price meals.

OUSD was among the first school districts in the country to implement restorative justice practices to limit or eliminate suspensions. During the 2015 school year, 96.1 percent of students were not suspended.

Started in 2010, OUSD's African American Male Achievement Initiative enrolls more than 400 students. Students in the program have experienced success, including higher GPAs, higher graduation rates (up over 10 percent), and lower suspension rates (with a decrease of 1/3 for students enrolled in the program). In 2016, OUSD launched an African American Girls and Young Women Achievement Program.

In 2015 and 2016, OUSD forged partnerships with and secured grants from a number of technology companies, including Salesforce, Intel, Code.org, and Google, and set a goal to make computer science a graduation requirement for the freshman class that begins school in 2017. However, computer science was still not a graduation requirement as of 2025.

== History ==
The first school in Oakland opened in the 1850s and was located in a rented room in the back of a fandango at Second and Washington Streets. On July 12, 1853, the city held a parade to the first official school building. The schoolhouse was at the corner of Fifth and Clay and cost $1,000 to construct. The first school house had 16 students and was taught by a woman named Hannah Jayne. She was the only teacher in Oakland until 1855. Franklin Warner was hired soon after as Oakland's first principal. Frederick M. Campbell was hired as Oakland's first Superintendent. Reading, writing and arithmetic were stressed, as well as American history. Paper and books were scarce, so a lot of learning was done out loud.

In 1860, there were about 400 students in one-room schoolhouses taught by one teacher, and another school building at Fifth and Broadway taught older students. The first public high school opened in 1869 with 29 students. By the end of the 1870s, there was a public high school and nine public grade schools. In the 1880s, the first kindergarten and the first night school in Oakland opened.

A 1909 Chamber of Commerce guide to the city includes this description of Oakland public schools: "Oakland's chief pride is its public school system and the fact that her schools rank among the highest in the United States. No more modern school buildings can be found in any city in the United States than in Oakland. There are twenty-two public school buildings, and according to the figures of the City Assessor (which, upon municipal property are naturally low) the school land valuations amount to One Million, Ninety-three Thousand, Two Hundred Seventy-five Dollars ... Connected with the High School is a completely equipped observatory, in which the study of astronomy is made effective and interesting with the aid of the most modern instruments."

A City of Oakland Chamber of Commerce brochure from 1915, which includes a photo of Oakland Technical High School, states: "The pride of Oakland is its schools. This, the Technical High School, with forges, machine shops, a great auditorium seating 1600 people, chemical laboratories and many other education features which prepare young men and women for an active and useful life, is one of the finest structures of its kind in the United States."

A 1915 Board of Education guide to Oakland schools included 46 schools, many of which are still open today. They include Allendale, Claremont, Cleveland, Dewey, Elmhurst, Emerson, Franklin, Frick, Fruitvale, Lincoln, Manzanita, McClymonds, Melrose, Peralta, Piedmont, Prescott, Sequoia, Santa Fe, Fremont High, Oakland High, and Oakland Tech. High school departments included English, History, Foreign Languages, Mathematics, Science, Commercial, Home Economics, Physical Training, Shop and Drawing.

Oakland's first teachers' union, the Oakland Federation of Teachers, was first organized on May 3, 1943, as the Alameda County Federation of Teachers, Local 771 of the American Federation of Teachers (AFT) to "improve the educational facilities for the children of the nation and to improve the working conditions of the teachers in the public schools."

Oakland's first African American Superintendent was Marcus Foster, who was also the first black man to head a major U.S. school district. Born in Athens, Georgia, Dr. Foster arrived in Oakland in 1970, "already a celebrated and proven educator". Foster viewed the three Rs and critical thinking as the building blocks of education. He also emphasized the need for art programs, team sports, and school activities that reflected the life circumstances of the students. In the short time he was in Oakland, Foster created a climate that gave life to a number of firsts: the Arts Magnet School, Far West School, Street Academy, Montera Film Festival (now the National Educational Film Festival), and the Oakland Education Institute (now the Marcus Foster Education Institute). Foster was murdered by the Symbionese Liberation Army in November, 1973.

Between 2014 and 2015, OUSD participated in a pilot experiment with Friends of the Earth to reduce its food-related greenhouse gas emissions by cutting the amount of meat and dairy sourced for its lunch program by 30%. Friends of the Earth reported that the experiment reduced OUSD's emissions per meal by 14% and water use by 6%.

In August 2024, OUSD, in partnership with transportation startup company Zum, introduced the first all-electric school bus fleet in the United States.

== Controversies ==
=== Financial mismanagement ===
Oakland Unified School District has experienced ongoing financial difficulties in recent years. In 2003, OUSD Superintendent Dennis K. Chaconas was fired and Governor Gray Davis approved a $100 million emergency loan, the biggest school bailout in California history. Chaconas was replaced by a state-appointed administrator, Randolph E. Ward. Ward resigned in July 2006 after being appointed superintendent of the San Diego public school system. Kimberly Statham was named Ward's permanent replacement, but she resigned suddenly on September 17, 2007, ostensibly under pressure from state officials. OUSD Chief of Staff Vincent Matthews was named interim superintendent.

In 2008, the state turned control over OUSD back to the city. The local school board hired an interim superintendent, Roberta Mayor, in July 2008 while the school board undertook a year-long search for a permanent leader. Anthony "Tony" Smith was hired in July 2009 as the district's permanent superintendent. Smith resigned suddenly in April 2013 after four years leading the district, citing family health issues. School board member Dr. Gary Yee was named the acting superintendent. In September 2014, Antwan Wilson became OUSD's fourth superintendent in six years. After just two years at the helm, Wilson resigned in November 2016 to become chancellor of the District of Columbia Public Schools. Devin Dillon, OUSD's deputy superintendent of Academic Social Emotional Learning, was named acting superintendent, effective February 1, 2017. The school board selected Kyla Johnson-Trammell to replace Wilson as superintendent in July 2017. Johnson-Trammell grew up in East Oakland, attended Oakland public elementary and middle schools, and had served the district as a teacher, principal, and administrator. On July 1, 2025 Denise Saddler became the interim superintendent for OUSD.

=== Grand Jury reports ===
A 2018 Alameda County Civil Grand Jury report noted that the District had been "in financial peril" for the prior 15 years, with an average $20 million to $30 million in debt each year, due to budgetary errors and out-of-control spending. Enrollment had dropped from 54,000 to 37,000 students, resulting in decreased state funding, but the district had opened more schools (Rudsdale Newcomer School, which serves immigrants, and the School of Language, a bilingual middle school), rather than closing them in response to declining enrollment, the report found. The report also criticized "system-wide failures" including "no accountability, lack of trust, and high teacher and administration turnover."

Another Alameda County Civil Grand Jury Report published a year later that financial instability was due to "the district's poor business practices and broken culture", rather than just outside pressures like declining enrollment. The report found that although the District ranked sixth in per-pupil state funding out of 37 Bay Area school districts, it had far above average spending on non-teaching costs and consultants, and lower than average spending on teachers and special education. Spending for supervisor and administrator salaries was found to be more than six times the statewide average. Under Superintendent Antwan Wilson, the report said, millions of dollars were wasted as capital projects were halted in the planning stages, and $172 million was spent on new construction projects, leaving the district's finances "in shambles." The Board of Education responded that the new Blueprint for Quality Schools, the Citywide Plan, and the Plan for Fiscal Vitality, released between the Grand Jury's investigation and the publication of its report, had already addressed some of the Grand Jury's recommendations. The Board of Education also disagreed or partially disagreed with many of the report's findings.

=== 2019 union strike ===
Members of the Oakland Education Association (OEA) went on strike for seven days, beginning on February 21, 2019, asking for fully funded public education, higher wages, and smaller class size. The strikes were part of the RedforEd campaign and were organized by the Oakland Education Association—a union for teachers—and East Bay Democratic Socialists of America (EBDSA). Oakland Unified School District is under populated with a total of 87 public schools, so they have a plan to close some public, unionized (and predominantly low-income) schools over the next few years in order to save money. $57 million meant for public-sector schools is funneled to the private-sector charter schools a year.

Leading up to the strike there was a meeting with the Oakland Unified School District Board of Education in which the community of Roots Academy, a school facing closure, testified a plea to keep their school open. Teachers gathered at the #RedforEd rally January 12, demonstrating that they are strike-ready. In show of solidarity, ten non-union charter schools "engaged in a wildcat sympathy strike". Rallies continued as teachers from all around the Bay Area took a sick day on January 18, 2019, and gathered at Oakland Technical High School to march to city hall in the name of public education. In an interview at the “sickout”, an Oakland teacher said “We have not had a contract for several years….The district is currently offering a 5% raise amounting to $70 extra which is not enough to keep up with the rising cost of housing in Oakland.” 1 in 5 teachers leave Oakland Unified School District because they cannot afford to teach in the city they live in. When asked if they had enough resources to succeed, three Oakland Tech students replied "No, we don't even have paper in some of the class rooms. Some kids do not have textbooks and they have to do their work at home, where they may not have internet. Our classes are overfilled. Sometimes students will try to print their work in the library but there will be no paper if there is no librarian. We did not have a librarian this whole school year until last week." Bread for Ed raised more than $175,000 to feed children and families out of school, because "73 percent of [Oakland] students depend on free or reduced lunch from their school".

The union struck for seven days. "97% of students were out of school, and tens of thousands were on the picket lines", according to Oakland Education Association. On February 28, 2019, OUSD "reached a tentative agreement" with OEA. On Sunday, March 3, Oakland Education Association teachers voted to authorize a new contract to implement an 11 percent increase in teachers' salary for the next four years, plus a 3 percent bonus to account for losses during the strike. The agreement also demands to decrease class size, hold off school closures for five months, and have the district vote on whether or not to push the state for a moratorium of charter schools.

=== Bond measures and mismanagement ===
In 2012, voters passed Measure J, a $475 million school facilities bond. The 2018–19 Alameda County Civil Grand Jury report found that mismanagement led to delays in the 21 projects that were to be funded with Measure J, and in 2018, nine of those projects were paused due to budget overruns and the district running out of funds. As of the publication of the Grand Jury report, $12.5 million of bond money had been spent over the prior four years on rented office space for central offices at 1000 Broadway following a flood in the administration building in 2014, despite questions about the legality of this practice.

In November 2020, Measure Y will ask voters whether to issue $735 million in additional bonds. If passed, the bonds will fund more than 20 projects, including upgrading and expanding seven schools, safety improvements, and converting a closed school to a new alternative education and administrative building, but are only one fifth of the district's calculated financial need for construction projects.

=== 2023 union strike ===
In May 2023, members of the Oakland Education Association union went on strike again citing pay and social issues as the reasons. On May 15, the union announced they had reached another deal with the district.

=== Lead contamination in Oakland public schools ===
In 2024, Oakland Unified discovered dangerous levels of lead contamination in the drinking water at most of its schools. The detection of the lead contamination was not immediately communicated to the public. The highest rates of lead contamination were found at Lincoln Elementary, Crocker Highlands Elementary, Cleveland Elementary, and Edna Brewer Middle School. At Crocker Highlands Elementary, lead contamination exceeding thresholds was found in 50% of the water fixtures, with the highest level of contamination detected being 440 parts per billion. The EPA has set the maximum contaminant level goal for lead in drinking water at zero because lead is a toxic metal that can be harmful to human health even at low exposure levels. Lead is persistent, and it can bioaccumulate in the body over time.

=== Discrimination against Jewish people ===
In October 2025, the California Department of Education found that OUSD violated California state law and discriminated against Jewish people. OUSD repeatedly sent out materials publicizing Arab American Heritage Month with a map of the Middle East that did not recognize the state of Israel and instead labeled the entire area as "Palestine". From the state's report, the California Department of Education concluded:

"The [California Department of Education] finds that this implied conclusion is inconsistent with the law. Specifically, the material findings of fact, supported by substantial evidence, demonstrated a failure to include Israel in a map of the current Middle East, and instead, labeling the entire location as “Palestine” in [Oakland Unified School District's] materials that were sent out in celebration of Arab American Heritage Month. This constituted discrimination towards Jewish persons."

The California Department of Education required the school district take corrective action by December 20, 2025.

== Academic performance ==
As of 2024, Oakland Unified students score 46.9 points below standard in English Language Arts, and 70.9 points below standard in mathematics, based on annual assessments of student academic performance. Oakland Unified has a high rate of chronic absenteeism, at 31.2%.

== Schools ==
As of June 2026 Oakland Unified School District includes 50 elementary schools, 17 middle schools, 17 high schools, and 8 alternative education schools and programs, together with 29 preschool programs and an adult education program. There are 24 charter schools that are licensed by the district but operated independently, including Oakland Military Institute and Oakland School for the Arts, both of which encompass grades 6–12. Reduced enrollment and financial shortfalls have led to school closures and mergers in the 2020s, with more proposed. In 2024, enrollment in district schools was approximately 34,000, and in charter schools, 10,800.

== Notable alumni ==
Notable Oakland public school graduates include:

- Steven F. Arnold — artist and protégé of Salvador Dalí
- Stephen Bechtel Sr. — founder of Bechtel Corporation
- David Carradine – actor
- Del the Funky Homosapien – musician
- Ronald V. Dellums – former Congressman and one-term mayor of Oakland
- Clint Eastwood – actor and director
- Scott Feldman — Major League Baseball pitcher
- Ben Fong-Torres – music writer
- Chick Gandil – baseball player; member of the infamous 1919 "Black Sox"
- Larry Graham – musician
- Tom Hanks – actor
- Rickey Henderson – Baseball Hall of Famer
- George H. Hildebrand — academic; former Deputy Undersecretary of Labor under Nixon
- Marsha Hunt – musician
- Brian Johnson – baseball player
- Emory Johnson – actor and director
- Kehlani – musician
- Damian Lillard – NBA star
- Jack London – author
- Marshawn Lynch – football player
- Gail Mahood — geologist
- MC Hammer – musician
- Edwin Meese – Attorney General
- Joe Morgan – Baseball Hall of Famer
- Julia Morgan – architect
- Lloyd Moseby – baseball player
- Huey P. Newton – activist
- Sten Odenwald – astronomer
- Gary Payton – Basketball Hall of Famer
- Marcus Peters – football player
- Bip Roberts – baseball player
- Frank Robinson – Baseball Hall of Famer
- Bill Russell – Basketball Hall of Famer
- Sheila E. – musician
- Dave Stewart – baseball player
- Too $hort – musician
- Rodney Yee – yoga instructor
