= Carole Ward Allen =

American politician and artist

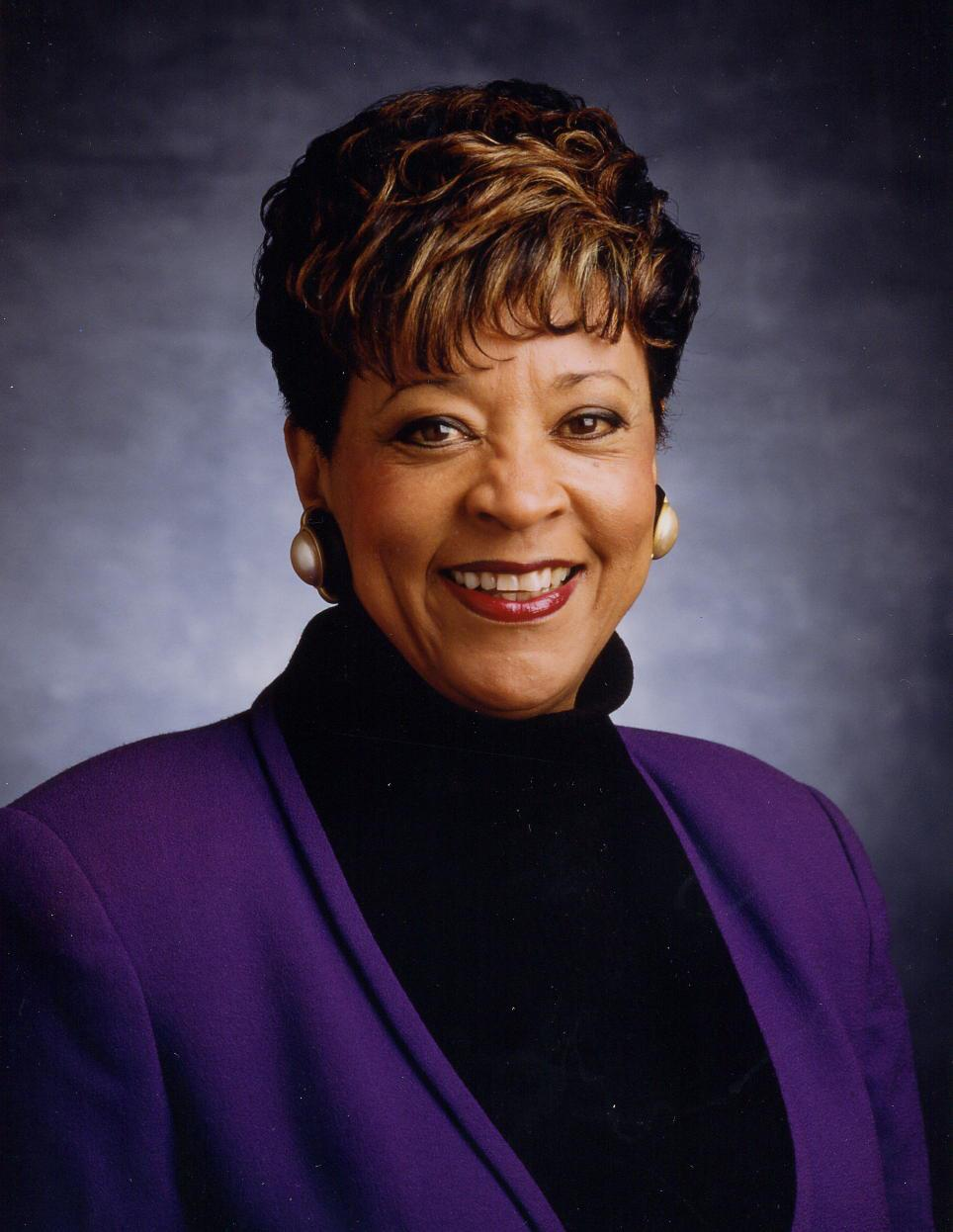

Director of the San Francisco Bay Area Rapid Transit from the 4th district
- In office December 8, 1998 – December 2, 2010
- Preceded by: Margaret Pryor
- Succeeded by: Robert Raburn

51st Oakland Port Commissioner
- In office April 20, 1987 – June 5, 1993
- Preceded by: Christine Scotlan
- Succeeded by: Ada C. Cole

Member of the California Commission on the Status of Women
- In office March 14, 1980 – August 20, 1985
- Governor: Jerry Brown; George Deukmejian

Personal details
- Born: Carole G. Allen Phenix City, Alabama, U.S.
- Party: Democratic
- Spouses: Lawrence Ward, Esq. (m. 1968; div. 1971); Ezell Ware Jr. (m. 1984; div. 1986)
- Relatives: Joyce Bryant (cousin)
- Education: San Jose State University (B.A.), (M.F.A.); Nova Southeastern University (Ed.D.)
- Occupation: Professor, Politician
- Website: CWA Partners, LLC

Carole Ward Allen is an American politician, professor, and political consultant. She is a member of the Democratic Party, and serves as the chief executive officer of CWA Partners, LLC. As a mass transportation executive in the State of California, Ward Allen served three four-year terms as an elected member of the San Francisco Bay Area Rapid Transit District Board of Directors representing the 4th district from 1998 until 2010.

During the 1980s and early 1990s, she was often featured in Jet Magazine for making history in state and local politics. Before entering the transportation industry, Ward Allen was appointed to serve on the California Commission on the Status of Women by 34th Governor of California Jerry Brown in 1980. In 1983, she was elected by her colleagues to serve as the commission's first African American chairperson for a one-year term. Ward Allen served on the state commission until 1985.

In 1987, Ward Allen was appointed to the Oakland Board of Port Commissioners by Oakland's 45th Mayor Lionel J. Wilson. In 1990, she was elected among board members to serve as president; making her the first African American female and the longest woman to achieve such stride with two one-year terms. After having served six years in public office at the Port of Oakland, her tenure ended in 1993.

In 1998, Ward Allen was elected by voters to the BART board of directors. As a BART director representing the 4th district (Oakland, California and Alameda, California), she led efforts to secure $4 billion in capital for system rehabilitation projects, the transit system's transit oriented development of the Fruitvale Village, and seismic retrofit programs.

On December 15, 2005, the BART board of directors elected Ward Allen to serve as its president and Lynette Sweet as its vice president; making BART the first major transportation agency to be led by two African-American women in American history.

In 2010, she led the BART Board and San Francisco Bay Area region through the process of approving the $484 million Oakland Airport Connector project, and securing federal funds under President Barack Obama's administration.

== Early life and education ==
Ward Allen was born Carole G. Allen in Phenix City, Alabama to mother Nell G. Allen, and father Claude O. Allen, who was a World War II veteran and an attorney who specialized in criminal law. Her father was one of the first African American lawyers in Oakland, California and the first African American to run for the Alameda County Board of Supervisors.

After graduating from Castlemont High School in 1960, Ward Allen went off to college. She holds a Bachelor of Arts and a Master of Fine Arts from San Jose State University, and a Doctor of Education in Higher Education from Nova Southeastern University in Fort Lauderdale, Florida.

Also, Ward Allen completed post-graduate studies at the Sorbonne, Paris; Fourah Bay College University, Sierra Leone; University of Ile-Ife, Nigeria; the University of Kumasi, Ghana; and University of Nairobi, Kenya.

== Peralta Community College District ==
In 1970, Ward Allen began her career at Peralta Community College District serving as a professor of Fine Arts at Laney College in Oakland, California. Later, she was elevated to assistant vice chancellor for urban development at the Peralta Community College District after having served as director of community relations and marketing at Laney College.

Ward Allen retired from Peralta in 2005, but served as an adjunct professor until 2017. She taught students African American history and was a member of the ethnic studies department.

== California Commission on the Status of Women ==
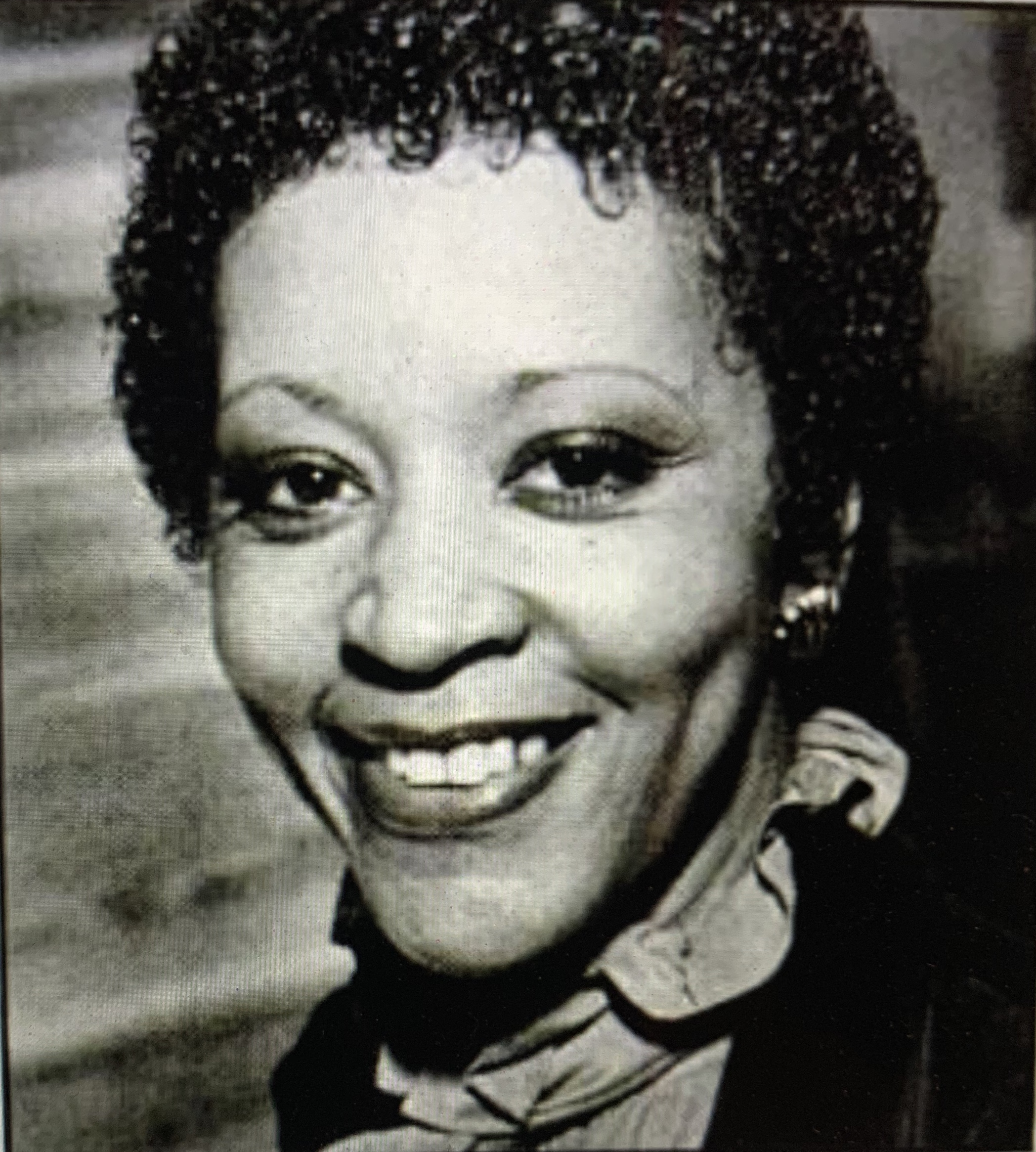
Official Photo of California commissioner Carole Ward Allen

=== Tenure ===
On March 14, 1980, Governor Jerry Brown appointed Ward Allen to the California Commission on the Status of Women. In 1983, she became its first African American chairperson. Her tenure ended with the state commission in 1985 under the leadership of Governor George Deukmejian.

=== Commission Policies to Advance Women's Rights ===
Much of her policy-making consisted of advancing women in small businesses and fortune 500 companies, improving military wives' circumstances, and fighting for women to return to their jobs after pregnancy. As commission chair, Ward Allen pushed for practical workplace policies that resulted in women receiving paid maternity leave; she worked closely on this workplace policy with then-Assemblywoman Maxine Waters who introduced a bill on this issue in 1984, and she advocated for women to receive equal compensation for equal work. Ward Allen told The New York Times that women should be allowed to return to the workplace after having children and be afforded maternity leave under California law. She saw maternity leave as a vital right for women and thought the lack of a maternity law in California perpetuated a false choice for women, stating:

"In essence it says women have a choice: You can choose to work or you can have children. But you can't have both."

California state legislators Diane Watson and Waters worked closely with commissioner Ward Allen on issues pertaining to women's rights in society. Ward Allen served on the commission with future-California state senator Hannah-Beth Jackson, and Irene Inouye who would become chair of the Ford Foundation Board of Trustees.

== Oakland Board of Port Commissioners ==
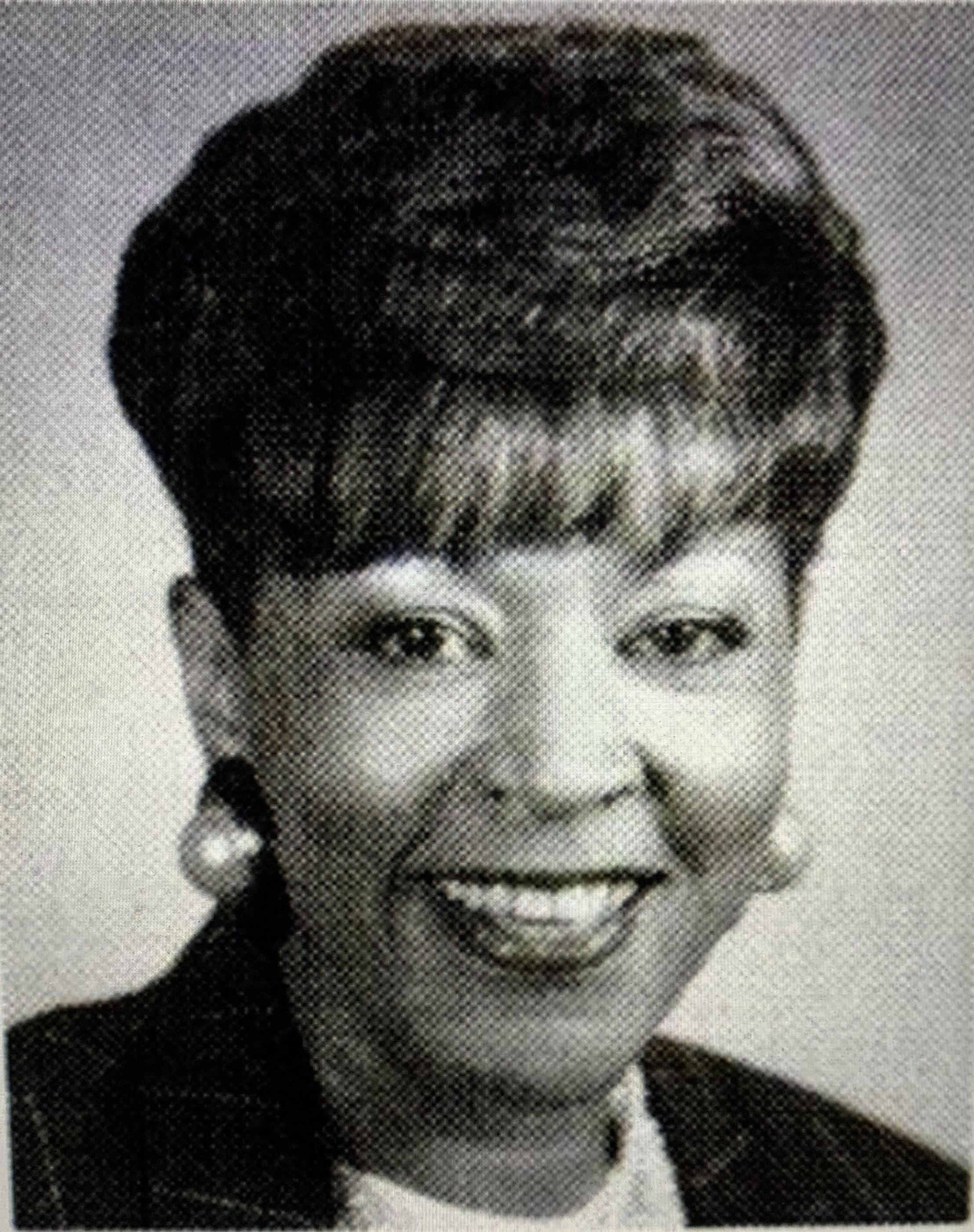
Portrait of Ward Allen as an Oakland port commissioner

=== Tenure ===
In 1987, Ward Allen was nominated by Oakland's 45th Mayor Lionel J. Wilson and appointed by the Oakland City Council to serve on the Oakland Board of Port Commissioners. From 1990 until 1992, she served as commission president, making her the first African American female to lead the port in its history; during a time when Oakland's port was recognized as one of the top ten ports in the country. Also, Ward Allen was the second African American female to be appointed to the commission and the third female.

During her six-year tenure with the port, Ward Allen was responsible for transportation, businesses, financial and political strategies for the development of the maritimes facilities, the Oakland International Airport, and commercial real estate holdings. In the capacity as port commissioner, she authorized port ordinances, provided policy directives to the chief executive officer or executive director, awarded funding for economic development projects, and managed a budget of $100 million, accounting for directly and indirectly more than 44,000 jobs.

Ward Allen led a wide range of port planning, port development, and port productivity projects working with port authorities across the world. While president of the board of port commissioners, she expanded maritime and aviation activities.

On August 6, 1991, she hired Charles Roberts as chief executive officer of the port. In addition, she was responsible for the controversial board authorization to award the City of Oakland $5.2 million to ease its fiscal crisis in 1991, whereby helping the city balance its budget.

=== Honoring John George ===
On January 3, 1989, Ward Allen honored the life and legacy of Alameda County Supervisor John George by authoring a resolution of condolence. George was a law partner of Ward Allen's father; working in his law office in 1960s, and a long-time family friend.

=== Amtrak to Oakland ===
In addition, Ward Allen along with her board members advocated and secured funds to bring Oakland - Jack London Square (Amtrak station) to Oakland in the early 1990s after the 1989 Loma Prieta earthquake. This was the second time in history Amtrak had come to Oakland. The site of the Amtrak station officially re-opened in 1995 owned by the Port of Oakland. Ward Allen was involved in much of the contracting and legal work surrounding the Port of Oakland owning the facility where the Amtrak station was built when she headed the Port from 1990 to 1992, working with two different city mayors; Lionel J. Wilson and Elihu Harris.

=== Jack London Square re-development ===
Ward Allen was a critical proponent of the Jack London Square Re-Development project during the late 1980s and early 1990s. In 1989, when Ward Allen was vice president of the Port of Oakland Board of Commissioners, the Port's headquarters relocated to Jack London Square and her name was engraved on the building.

=== Dredging projects ===
In July 1991, then-President Ward Allen of the Board of Port Commissioners, advocated for permits to be issued to allow dredging to take place at the port. She pushed for dredging at the port along with labor representatives and other agencies, stating that:

"Dredging is already needed . . . the port is the shallowest on the West Coast."

=== Oakland Aviation High School ===
Ward Allen was an advocate for the creation of Oakland Aviation High School, which was adopted by the Oakland Unified School District with the Port of Oakland serving as a partner of the charter school. While she was on the BART Board, she remained committed to serving as an advocate of this charter school since her days on the Board of Port Commissioners.

== Oakland City Council campaigns ==
=== 1998 election ===
Ward Allen was a District 6 Oakland City Council candidate in 1998 challenging then-city councilman Nathan Miley. She ran a strong campaign having received major endorsements from local elected officials that resulted in her earning 42% of the vote to Miley's 52%. Ward Allen's first city council campaign was effective, but unsuccessful in unseating an incumbent.

=== 2001 special election ===
In 2001, Ward Allen sought her second bid to become District 6 Oakland city councilperson. Her candidacy was endorsed by Oakland city councilmen Larry Reid and Dick Spees. After having campaigned aggressively on the trail a second time, she lost to union leader Moses Mayne by 129 votes in a hotly contested special election.

== BART Board of Directors ==
=== Tenure ===
Ward Allen was first elected by voters to serve on the BART Board of Directors on November 3, 1998, which is a special-purpose district body that governs the Bay Area Rapid Transit system in the California counties of Alameda, Contra Costa, and San Francisco. Ward Allen represented the 4th district in Alameda County, which included the cities of Oakland and Alameda. She was re-elected in 2002 and 2006 running unopposed.

During Ward Allen's tenure she changed policies, procedures, operations, and reformed the BART Police with assistance from the California State Legislature and members of the general public under her watch.

In addition, she advocated for the hiring of Dorothy Dugger as the first female to serve as general manager or CEO of the entire BART organization. Although, Ward Allen originally supported the hiring of an African American female, Beverly Scott of the Sacramento Regional Transit District to become general manager, she had to compromise.

Ward Allen constantly reinforced transit oriented development policy-making, which resulted in affordable housing and livable communities for residents in the Fruitvale, Coliseum, and Lake Merritt districts. She supported minority-and-women-owned businesses stay afloat economically, and generated employment opportunities for her constituents.

Ward Allen's greatest public policy achievements were passing legislation to build the controversial Oakland Airport Connector project, and advocating for civilian oversight of the BART Police Department. She called on the California State Legislature to assist the BART Board, according to the San Francisco Chronicle, stating:

"We urge our state legislators to take swift action so we can implement civilian oversight this year."

Additionally, she served as vice president in 2005 and President in 2006 of the BART board of directors, managing a budget of $672 million for the transportation agency.

=== Oakland Airport Connector Project ===
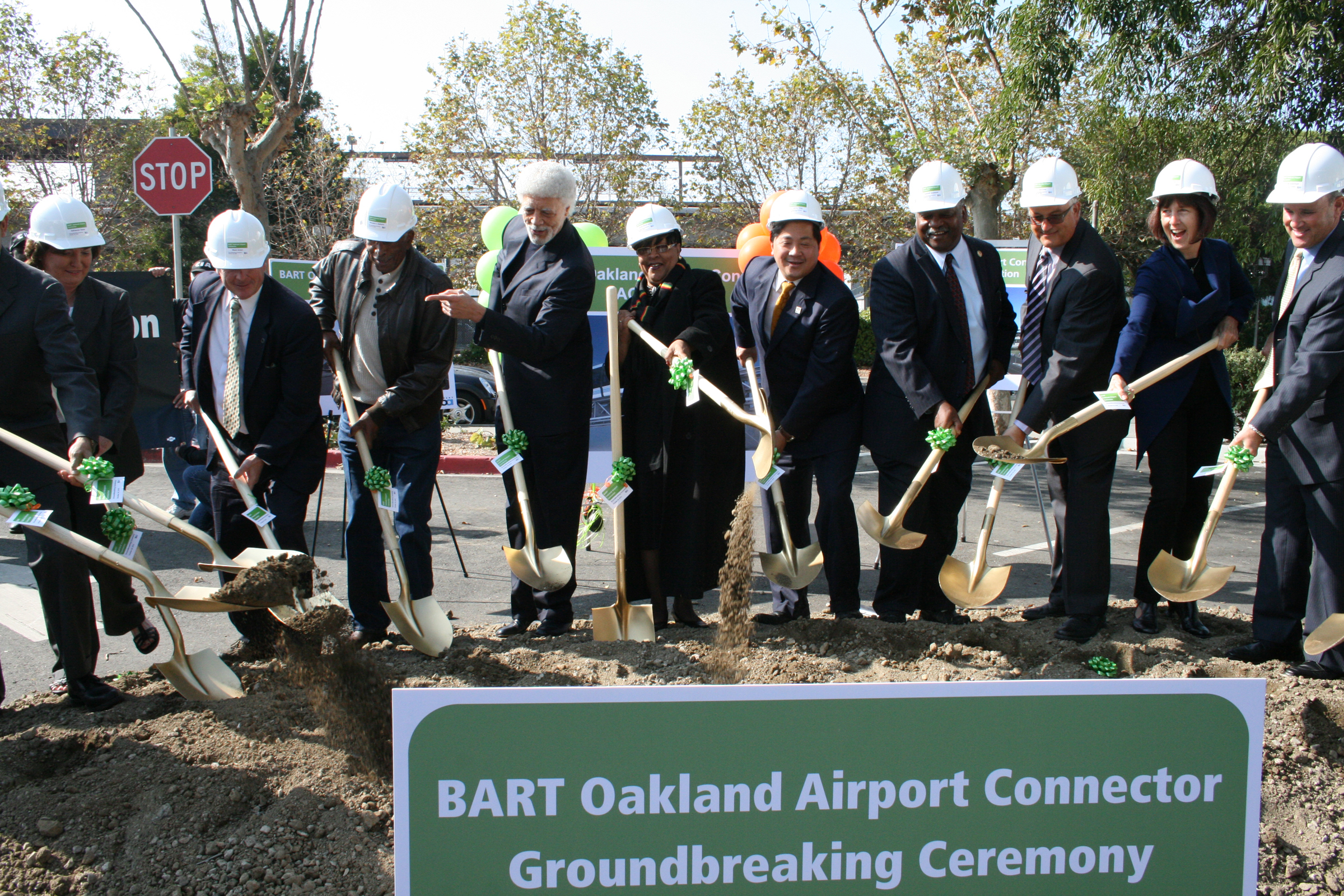
Left, Ronald V. Dellums, (Center) Ward Allen, James Fang, and Sandre Swanson at the groundbreaking of the Oakland Airport Connector in 2010.

Since 1998, Ward Allen fought vigorously for the creation of contracting opportunities for small minority-and-women-owned businesses. Providing employment opportunities to Oakland and Alameda residents was her main source of motivation in elected office. Therefore, she often collaborated with the local unions to facilitate the creation of job opportunities to put people back to work and provide economic relief to citizens, especially in the wake of the Great Recession. For example, the Oakland Airport Connector project generated approximately 2,500 to 5,200 direct and indirect jobs. Ward Allen actively sponsored many of BART's historic measures such as its first Project Labor Agreement with zip-code-priority to disadvantaged communities in her district and formulated the first small business and bonding committee to help mitigate economic disparities disproportionately impacting minority-owned businesses.

On October 20, 2010, BART director Ward Allen had a ground breaking event on the project at the Oakland Coliseum Station and was joined by Congresswoman Barbara Lee, Mayor Ron Dellums, Assemblywoman Sandre Swanson, Oakland city councilman Larry Reid, Port of Oakland officials, representatives of local unions and ministers on its announcement to the public. The high-tech and environmentally friendly 3.2-mile automated Oakland Airport Connector began operating in November 2014.

=== Title VI ===
As chairwoman of the Oakland Airport Connector Committee, she has solicited the input from diverse communities (such as non-English speaking and low-income), in the aftermath of a civil rights complaint against the construction of the Oakland Airport Connector. She was the first BART director to demand that signage and documentation needed to be multi-lingual; to serve her communities, but to ensure diverse populations understand how to evacuate train stations in the circumstance of an emergency. This need was especially a priority to Oakland's Chinatown and Fruitvale districts given the predominantly Asian and Latino populations. Furthermore, she made sure there were live translators available for the first time in BART's history during community and townhall meetings in 2009.

=== California legislation to enforce civilian oversight ===
On July 15, 2010, Governor Arnold Schwarzenegger signed the historic BART Accountability Act AB 1586 into California law, which Ward Allen urged the California State Legislature to adopt during a Senate hearing on June 15, 2010. She worked closely with Assemblyman Sandre Swanson, who authored the legislation, to enforce civilian oversight of the BART Police Department. Ward Allen thanked the governor, the community, the entire BART organization and Assemblyman Swanson for their hard work on getting AB 1586 bill implemented in the aftermath of the shooting of Oscar Grant. The law also created the Office of the Independent Auditor at BART, which would investigate matters brought to the BART Board by the civilian oversight committee.

In addition to changing California law, Ward Allen supported the family of Oscar Grant by being the only BART director who attended the Oscar Grant trial on the nine-member board in Los Angeles during the summer of 2010. Earlier, in the same year, she was one of the keynote speakers at the inaugural vigil; honoring the life of Oscar Grant and supporting his family at the Fruitvale station. In her speech, she apologized again on the behalf of BART for his tragic death, and gave Grant's uncle Cephus Johnson a bouquet of flowers for the family. The events leading up to Grant's death were chronicled in the film Fruitvale Station, in which Michael B. Jordan starred as Grant. The Fruitvale station was in Ward Allen's district.

=== BART Police Department reform ===
In 2009, the hiring of two independent organizations reviewed BART's policies and procedures in the process of reforming the BART Police. The two independent firms, included the National Organization of Black Law Enforcement and Myers Nave who were responsible for investigating the matters of BART Police Shooting of Oscar Grant and were charged with making recommendations to the board. Ward Allen acknowledged that the BART Police Department needed to be reformed and restructured. She told the public at its first board meeting after the shooting that:

"We must learn from our mistakes and we must make sure [the killing of unarmed passenger] never happens again. I want to hear everything you have to say. You have every right to hold us accountable."

Thereafter, Ward Allen formulated and chaired BART's first Police Department Review Committee, and as a result, BART made sweeping changes on many security measures, as well as corrected and implemented several policies and procedures. BART Police Department Review Committee has led to the re-training of all officers on use of force, diversity re-training and other issues. Ward Allen hired Kenton Rainey, the person selected to lead BART's 296-member police force, to take command as Chief of Police.

=== Coliseum Intercity Rail Station ===
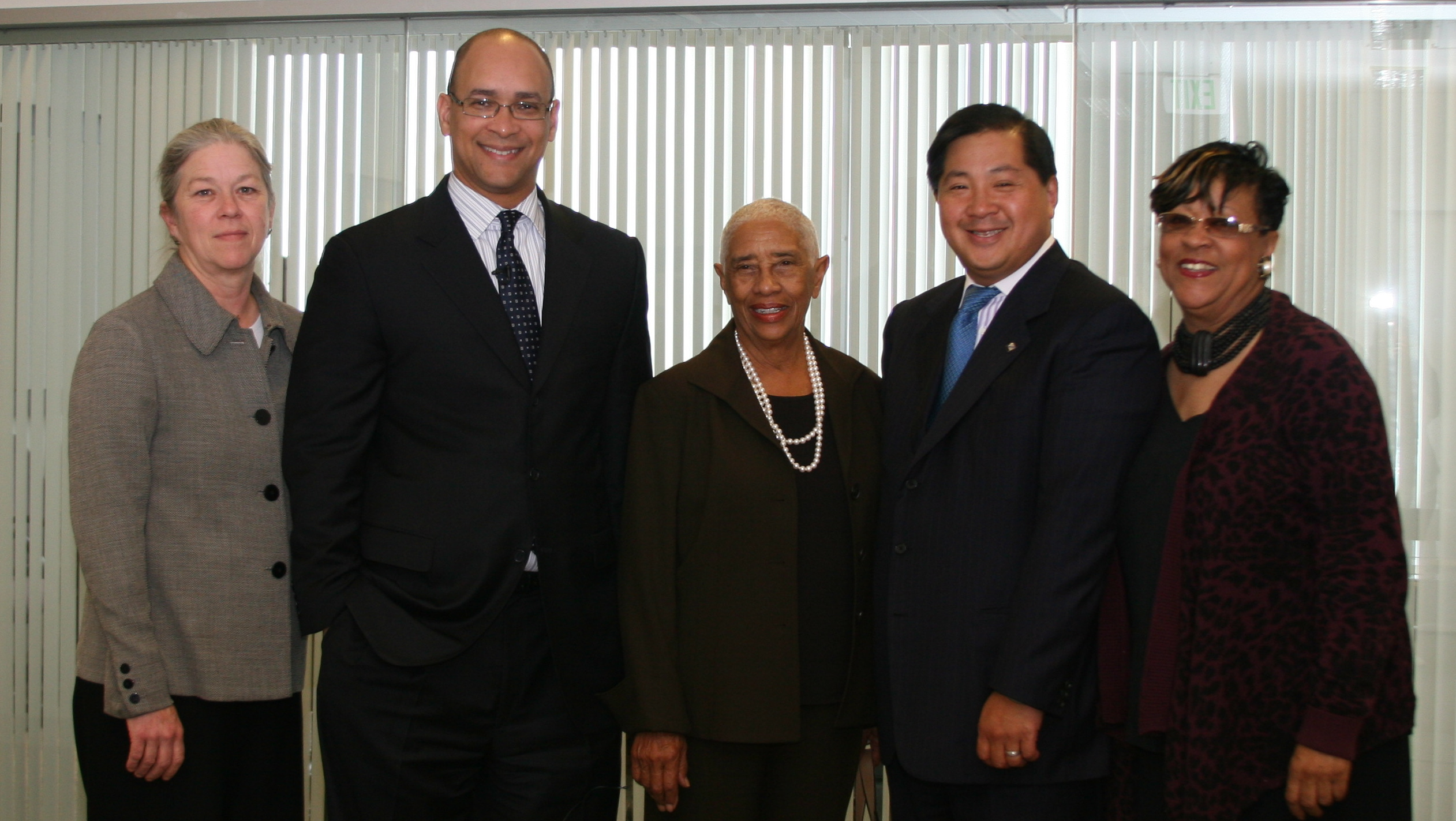
Dorothy Dugger, David Hinson, and Ward Allen (far right) finishing a business meeting with U.S. Department of Commerce.

On May 25, 2005, then-Vice President Ward Allen of the BART board of directors joined Oakland Mayor Jerry Brown, city councilman Larry Reid, CCJPA vice chair Forrest Williams, and Caltrans Division of Rail Chief Bill Bronte at the grand opening of the Oakland Coliseum Intercity Rail Station. She was a proponent of the $6.6 million facility being built to provide other modes of public transportation to citizens of Oakland and the Bay Area. Ward Allen served on the Capitol Corridor Joint Powers Authority board of directors for several years during the early 2000s.

=== Fruitvale and Coliseum Transit Villages ===
Ward Allen's efforts toward cultivating a more eco-friendly and green environment for BART resulted in the largest BART bicycle station being created as a part of the Fruitvale transit village. The Fruitvale transit village is a national model for transit oriented development, given Ward Allen and former BART director Margaret Pryor's leadership. The Fruitvale transit village was built in partnership with the Spanish Speaking Unity Council, and Phase I was completed in 2004. Phase I included 94 rental units, 92 of which were affordable households that were considered low income, and 2 market-rate units. This was a significant victory for BART's 4th district residents in the City of Oakland. On July 22, 2010, Ward Allen and the BART Board approved 3.4 acres of property that remained undeveloped for Phase II of the transit village.

In addition, she worked hard on the Coliseum transit village for more than a decade and approved its construction of single-family for-sale homes — with some set aside for low- and moderate-income residents — as well as shops and restaurants. Ward Allen worked closely with Oakland city councilman Larry Reid to approve the third stage of the transit village project, which would explore building approximately 100 workforce housing units on what is now a 1.3-acre parking lot at Snell Street and 71st Avenue in their shared district.

=== Small/Minority/Women-Owned Business and Bonding Committee ===
In 2009, Ward Allen formulated BART's first Small/Minority/Women-Owned Business and Bonding Committee. The committee sought to address the critical problems that are preventing minority-and-women-owned construction businesses from receiving adequate information in a timely fashion, making plan rooms available to low-income communities, expediting the response time of all allocations and qualifying for contracts. Ward Allen advocated that the BART Board should earmark a part of the capital budget to support disadvantaged business enterprises, resulting in BART injecting up to $45 million between 2009 and 2014 into the local economy with much of that money going to minority- and women-owned businesses.

== Public service recognition ==
In March 2011, Ward Allen was inducted into the Alameda County Women's Hall of Fame in the category of Education. She has taught over 100,000 students in the San Francisco Bay Area, according to The Oakland Post. Many students have indicated that she made a fundamental difference in their lives and inspired them to seek out knowledge.

The Conference of Minority Transportation Officials (COMTO) presented Ward Allen with the Lifetime Achievement Award at its annual awards ceremony in 2011 for her dedication to public service in the transportation industry, and recognizing her achievement of breaking ground on the Oakland Airport Connector, a landmark construction project legislated by Ward Allen.

In 2008, Laney College President Frank Chong recognized Ward Allen for her leadership in higher education with the President's Award.

In 2005, she received recognition for her expertise as a groundbreaking executive of public transportation with the National Coalition of 100 Black Women, Inc San Francisco Bay Area chapter's Pioneer Award at the 7th Annual Madam C.J. Walker Business and Community Recognition Awards Luncheon. At the time, Ward Allen was the Vice President of BART Board of Directors.

== See also ==
- African American firsts
- Bay Area Rapid Transit
- Port of Oakland
- Shooting of Oscar Grant

Political offices
Preceded by Margaret Pryor	Director of San Francisco Bay Area Rapid Transit; 4th District; 1998-2010	Succeeded by Robert Raburn
Preceded by Christine Scotlan	51st Oakland Port Commissioner; 1987-1993	Succeeded by Ada C. Cole
Preceded by Anita Miller	California Commission on the Status of Women; Jerry Brown; George Deukmejian; 1980-1985	Succeeded by Jan Hall
