= 2009 Oakland Riots =

2009 Oakland Riots may refer to:

- January 7th riots in Oakland, California
- February 1st riots in Oakland, Pittsburgh
