= Incontrovertible evidence =

Colloquial term for evidence introduced to prove a fact

Incontrovertible evidence and conclusive evidence (less formally, concrete evidence and hard evidence) are colloquial terms for evidence introduced to prove a fact that is supposed to be so conclusive that there can be no other truth to the matter; i.e., evidence so strong it overpowers contrary evidence, directing a fact-finder to a specific and certain conclusion.

A "conclusive evidence" clause may be included in a contract or deed of guarantee, having the effect of showing that, in the absence of manifest error, the guarantor is liable to deliver on their guarantee when their obligation is triggered. The Court of Appeal (England and Wales) ruled in IIG Capital LLC v Van de Merwe (22 May 2008) that wording in a deed of guarantee, stating that "A certificate in writing signed by a duly authorised officer ... stating the amount at any particular time due and payable by the Guarantor ... shall, save for manifest error, be conclusive and binding on the Guarantor for the purposes hereof" bound the guarantor despite the otherwise "strong presumption" against a guarantee being treated as a demand bond or guarantee payable on demand, and the Commercial Court in England and Wales ruled on the effect of a similar clause in the case of Carey Value Added S.L. v Grupo Urvasco SA in 2010. Conclusive evidence clauses are interpreted strictly by the courts, with any ambiguity being resolved in favour of the guarantor.

== See also ==
- Direct evidence
- Smoking gun
