= Killing of Oscar Grant =

2009 police killing in Oakland, California

- A screenshot of Grant pinned down as police are handcuffing him, moments before the shooting; this was captured from one of the videos that recorded the police incident.
- Location: Oakland, California, U.S.
- Date: January 1, 2009; 17 years ago 2:15 AM (PST; UTC−08:00)
- Attack type: Homicide, manslaughter, police killing, shooting
- Victims: Oscar Juliuss Grant III, aged 22
- Perpetrator: Johannes Mehserle
- Charges: Second-degree murder, voluntary manslaughter, involuntary manslaughter, and gun enhancement
- Verdict: Guilty of involuntary manslaughter and gun enhancement; Not guilty of second-degree murder and voluntary manslaughter; Gun enhancement conviction overturned by trial judge
- Convictions: Involuntary manslaughter
- Sentence: 2 years
- Litigation: $50,000,000.00 (originally $27,000,000.00) lawsuit by John Burris against BART on behalf of Grant's mother and daughter was settled for $2,800,000.00; Grant's father's lawsuit was denied

Oscar Grant was a 22-year-old Black man who was killed in the early morning hours of New Year's Day 2009 by BART Police Officer Johannes Mehserle in Oakland, California. Responding to reports of a fight on a crowded Bay Area Rapid Transit train returning from San Francisco, BART Police officers detained Grant and several other passengers on the platform at the Fruitvale BART Station. BART officer Anthony Pirone kneed Grant in the head and forced Grant to lie face down on the platform. Officer Johannes Mehserle drew his pistol and shot Grant. Grant was rushed to Highland Hospital in Oakland and pronounced dead later that day. The events were captured on bystanders' mobile phones. Owners would then upload the footage to YouTube. Both protests and riots took place in the following days.

On January 30, 2010, Alameda County prosecutors charged Mehserle with second-degree murder in their indictment for the shooting. Mehserle resigned from his position and pleaded not guilty. The trial began on June 10, 2010. On July 8, 2010, Mehserle was found guilty of involuntary manslaughter and not guilty of the murder charge.

Though initial protests on July 8, 2010, against the jury verdict were peacefully organized, after dark there were incidents of looting, arson, destruction of property, and small riots. Nearly 80 people were eventually arrested. On November 5, 2010, Mehserle was sentenced to two years, minus time served. He served his time in Los Angeles County Jail protective custody, held in a private cell for his safety. On June 13, 2011, Mehserle was released under parole after serving 11 months. Following a 2012 failed appeal of his conviction, Mehserle changed his name and his profession.

Oakland civil rights attorney John Burris filed a $25,000,000.00 wrongful death claim against BART on behalf of Grant's family. BART settled with Grant's daughter and mother for a total of $2,800,000.00 in 2011. It also settled with several of Grant's friends who had sued for damages because of police brutality. A separate suit by Grant's father did not result in a jury award, as it was decided that due to his imprisonment he was not sufficiently involved in Grant's life.

The killing, and the protests against it, were an important precursor to the Black Lives Matter movement, which began in 2013. The biographical drama film Fruitvale Station (2013), written and directed by Ryan Coogler, portrays the last 24 hours of Grant's life, his killing, and the immediate aftermath.

== Involved parties ==
=== Oscar Juliuss Grant III ===
Oscar Grant III

Oscar Juliuss Grant III (February 27, 1986 – January 1, 2009) lived in Hayward, California. He worked as a meat cutter at Farmer Joe's Marketplace in Oakland's Dimond District after jobs at several Kentucky Fried Chicken outlets. Grant had attended both San Lorenzo and Mount Eden high schools in San Lorenzo and Hayward, respectively, until the 10th grade and eventually earned his GED. Grant was on parole at the time of his death, having been released from prison following a 16-month sentence for gun possession.

Grant's funeral was held at the Palma Ceia Baptist Church in Hayward on January 7, 2009. His mother, sister, daughter, and girlfriend (his daughter's mother) filed a wrongful death claim against BART following his death. It was settled in 2011.

=== Johannes Mehserle ===
Johannes Sebastian Mehserle (born 1982, in Germany) was raised in the Bay Area. He graduated from New Technology High School in Napa, California.

Mehserle joined the Bay Area Rapid Transit (BART) Police in March 2007.

== Incident ==
Oscar Grant had been celebrating with his friends at The Embarcadero in San Francisco on New Year's Eve. He and about eight friends returned to the East Bay in the lead car of a BART train bound for Fruitvale, a station in Oakland. BART offered extended service and a special "Flash Pass" for the New Year's Eve holiday.

At approximately 2:00 a.m. PDT, BART Police responded to reports of a physical altercation involving up to 20 people on an incoming train from the West Oakland BART Station; the participants were described as "hammered and stoned".

BART Officer Marysol Domenici was the first officer on the scene along with her partner, Tony Pirone. The officers removed Grant and several other men suspected of fighting from the train and detained them on the platform. They tried to take control of passengers coming off the train. Domenici testified at the BART incident hearing that Grant and his friends swore at her and did not obey her orders; she is quoted as having testified that: "If they would've followed orders, this wouldn't have happened. They probably would've just been cited and released."

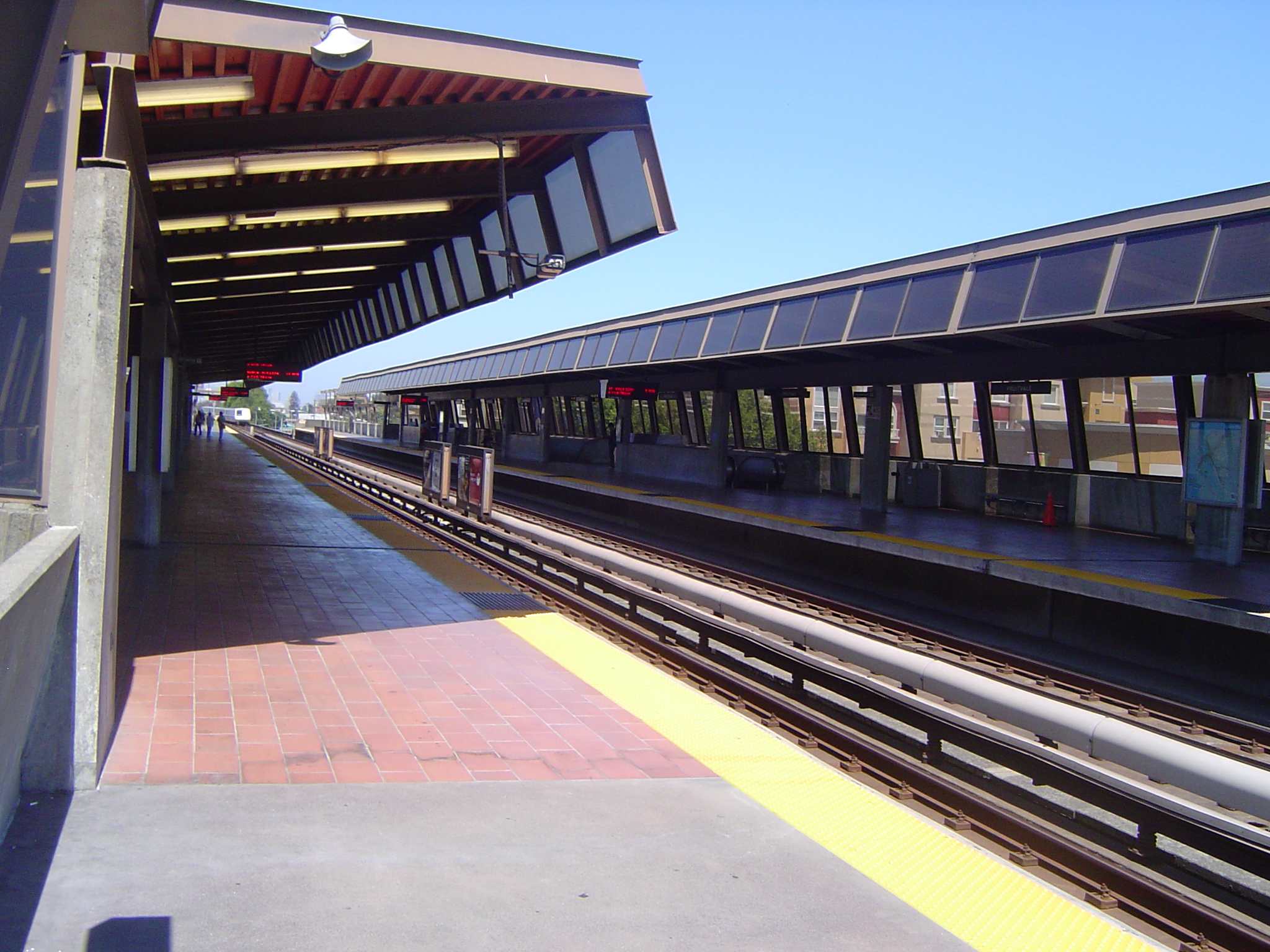
Fruitvale BART station, where Grant was shot and killed

Pirone handcuffed Grant's friend, angering other riders, and proceeded to line up Grant and two other men against the wall. Grant raised his hands while seated against the platform wall. A subsequent internal investigation conducted by an outside law firm retained by BART found that Pirone lied when he claimed to have confirmed with the train operator that the men the BART police detained on the platform were involved in the reported train fight; rather, the train operator recalled informing Pirone that she was unsure whether those detained had been involved in the fight. When five other officers, including Johannes Mehserle and his partner Woffinden, arrived at the Fruitvale station, they found the situation to be "chaotic", according to their own accounts.

While dozens of people from the stopped train shouted and cursed at officers, Mehserle and Pirone positioned Grant face-down. According to Pirone, Grant was disobeying instructions and cursing at officers. Witnesses said that Grant pleaded with BART police not to shock him with a taser. Pirone knelt on Grant's neck and told him that he was under arrest for resisting an officer.

A cell phone video (broadcast on local television station KTVU on January 23) showed what appeared to be Pirone rushing towards one of the detained men and punching him in the face multiple times, two minutes before the shooting occurred. Grant's family alleges in their civil claim against BART that an officer threw Grant against a wall and kneed him in the face. Witnesses testified that Pirone was the aggressor during the incident. An attorney for Grant's family, John Burris, also disputed Pirone's account, saying that Grant and his friends were "peaceful" when the train stopped.

The internal investigation report found that Pirone struck Grant in the head and kneed him, likely causing injuries documented in his autopsy, including head fractures and a hematoma. Until the report became public in May 2019, Pirone's attorney had maintained that Grant provoked Pirone by trying to knee the officer in the groin and by hitting Domenici's arm when she tried to handcuff one of Grant's friends. Additional footage from a cell phone was presented in court showing Pirone standing over the prone Grant before the shooting and yelling: "Bitch ass nigga, right?" Pirone and his attorney say he was repeating an insulting epithet that Grant had yelled at him.

Mehserle tried to handcuff Grant but could not reach his hands. He stood up, unholstered his gun, a SIG Sauer P226, and fired a shot into Grant's back. Immediately after the shooting, Mehserle appeared surprised and raised his hands to his face. Several witnesses say Mehserle said "Oh my God!" several times after the shooting. The .40 caliber bullet from Mehserle's semi-automatic handgun entered Grant's back, exited through his front side and ricocheted off the concrete platform, puncturing his lung. According to one witness, Grant yelled, "You shot me! I got a four-year-old daughter!" Grant died seven hours later, at 9:13 a.m., at Highland Hospital in Oakland.

Initially, there were rumors that Grant was handcuffed before he was killed, but court filings by the district attorney's office do not state that he was handcuffed. However, they do say that Grant's hands were behind his back and that he was "restrained and unarmed". Mehserle said he feared that Grant was "going for his waistband" and a gun. The day after the shooting, BART spokesman Jim Allison said that Grant was not restrained when he was shot, and multiple witnesses testified that Grant refused to give up his hands for handcuffing prior to the shooting. The family's claim against BART stated that Grant was handcuffed only after he was shot.

== Video evidence ==
Direct evidence of the shooting was documented by video cameras held by passengers on the train idling next to the platform, as police detained Grant and a number of other men suspected of being involved in the disturbance. Several witnesses testified during the preliminary hearing for Mehserle's trial that they began recording because they believed BART officers were acting too aggressively. They gave the videos to television news, which broadcast them; others posted videos on the internet.

Oakland attorney John Burris, who represented the family in their suit against BART over Grant's death, said BART confiscated numerous cell phone images that he believed contain additional evidence of the killing. Alameda County District Attorney Tom Orloff said video confiscated by BART was useful in bringing the murder charge against Mehserle. Witnesses at the scene said police attempted to confiscate cameras. These claims were never acknowledged by BART police.

Orloff, the district attorney, said that several passenger videos that had not been made public were "very helpful" in the investigation.

On January 2, KTVU aired a video by an anonymous passenger who submitted a cell phone video of the shooting. On January 23, KTVU aired a cell-phone video which appeared to show a second officer punching Grant in the face prior to the shooting. In late February, KRON 4 aired a clip of a video showing a different angle of this altercation.

BART spokesperson Linton Johnson described the surveillance footage from the Fruitvale platform cameras as "benign". He said the platform cameras had recorded some of the incident, but footage did not include the shooting.

Frank Borelli, a retired police officer and writer, said that the scene as shown in the video moments before the shooting would be as important to understanding what happened as the shooting itself. "The four officers have to be operating under a high level of stress given the relatively confined setting and the people on the BART train who are expressing, in a very loud vocal fashion, their displeasure with the officers' actions. Those officers, should things go bad for them, are vastly outnumbered by a group of people who have already voiced their unhappiness with the police."

After viewing the shooting from multiple angles, police use-of-force expert Roy Bedard, who initially said he thought the shooting was an accident, changed his mind. He said: "I hate to say this, [but] it looks like an execution to me" and "It really looks bad for the officer." University of San Francisco law professor Robert Talbot said the videos could support a claim of an accidental shooting: "Nothing about his [Mehserle's] body looks murderous."

=== Influence of videos ===
Video evidence of the incident were widely broadcast and streamed online. Seven hundred thousand people viewed the videos in the first few days after the shooting. One local television station video posted to its website was downloaded more than 500,000 times in four days, and one independent media video posted to the internet averaged more than 1,000 views per hour. Seeing direct evidence of the shooting resulted in public outrage and protests and fueled riots.

== BART review and investigation process ==
After the 2009 shooting, Mehserle submitted to drug and alcohol testing per BART's standard operating procedure. The results showed no drugs or alcohol in his system. He retained a criminal defense attorney and refused to speak to the authorities, invoking the Public Safety Officers Procedural Bill of Rights Act (California Government Code section 3300–3313) and the Fifth Amendment, claiming potential self-incrimination.

BART organized an internal investigation of the incident. On January 5, 2009, Mehserle's attorney postponed a scheduled meeting by BART investigators, seeking to defer it. BART Police administration and investigators commanded the officer to attend an investigative interview on January 7. Mehserle did not attend; instead his attorney and his BART Police Officers Association union representative came and submitted his letter of resignation.

Mehserle and his family received a number of death threats after videos of the shooting appeared, and he moved at least twice. His parents temporarily left their Napa home because of death threats to the family.

Domenici testified at the investigation hearing. She was terminated by BART based on an accusation that she was untruthful in her statements to transit investigators. She appealed the firing. On December 18, 2010, it was reported that San Francisco labor arbitrator William Riker ordered the former officer re-instated with full back pay because there was no basis to find that Domenici was not telling the truth.

== Aftermath ==
The shooting and the subsequent uprisings were covered in regional, national, and international news. Video images of the shooting were widely broadcast and streamed online in the days following Grant's death. Several hundred thousand viewed the videos in the first few days after the incident. Widespread dissemination of the direct evidence of the shooting led to public outrage, protests, and fueled riots.

Police in riot gear were dispatched and made efforts to disperse the crowds. During the course of the evening of January 8, there was peaceful protest, with some of the protesters turning to rioting and rampant property vandalism. A black bloc and other rioters smashed hundreds of car and shop windows, several private cars, and numerous trash containers and dumpsters. Public buildings such as the Oakland Police Internal Affairs office and the almost restored Fox Theatre were heavily vandalized. The rioting wound down later in the evening. Police made at least 105 arrests for suspicion of various offenses. More than 300 businesses were affected by the vandalism.

Community members and activists decried the shooting incident as another case of police brutality. There was a broad public perception that BART Police and the Alameda County District Attorney's office were not conducting an effective investigation because, according to an East Bay Times article, BART completed the shooting investigation on January 12, 2009, 11 days after the shooting occurred. Others were angry that Mehserle allegedly did not cooperate with Police and District Attorney's Office investigators.

=== Fruitvale protest and march; downtown rioting ===
On January 7, 2009, protests over the shooting and administration of justice began peacefully about 3:30 p.m. with about 500 people gathering at the Fruitvale station. In the early evening, some of the protesters marched toward Oakland's central business district and downtown. Over 200 Oakland police officers were dispatched in an attempt to disperse the protesters. Police roadblocked streets and diverted vehicle and foot traffic. After entering the central business district, the march continued to BART Police command and control headquarters at 8th & Madison streets near the Lake Merritt BART station.

Once at BART Police Command and Control, a contingent of angry protesters surrounded a police car. The officer driving the car fled on foot. Meanwhile, a group of 30 to 40 demonstrators broke out the cruiser's windows and attempted to overturn it. A line of police wearing gas masks swept up behind the rear of the march and deployed tear gas in an attempt to disperse the crowd.

The protest continued as the crowd marched along 8th Street through Chinatown. At Broadway, officers wearing gas masks deployed more tear gas canisters and acted quickly to charge and disperse the crowd as they approached the vicinity of Oakland Police headquarters at 7th and Broadway.

The protest regrouped downtown at the intersection of 14th and Broadway, blocking motor vehicle traffic. Some of the protesters lay face down in the intersection, in a symbolic act of solidarity with Grant, who was killed in the same position. Others shouted at police and chanted in unison. Others carried signs that read, "Your idea of justice?" and "Jail Killer Cops" and lit candles in remembrance of Grant.

Police in helmets and gas masks grouped in standing line formations on the south, west, and north sides of the intersection, allowing an avenue of retreat down 14th Street on the east side of the intersection.

About an hour later, police gave orders to disperse and fired tear gas, rubber bullets, and other less-lethal weapons and devices at demonstrators. Protestors threw bottles, rocks, and other objects at police. Police pushed the crowd east along 14th Street into Lakeside, and the scene dissolved into a riot along the 14th Street spine.

Numerous helicopters which had been airborne throughout the evening converged on the area. Law enforcement helicopters shone powerful spotlights down onto surface streets, while media helicopters shot video, which were broadcast in real time on local television stations.

In the ensuing hours, a small clutch of rioters burned the contents of trash cans, dumpsters, newspaper boxes and set fire to at least five cars, including an Oakland police patrol car. Some rioters smashed the windshields of parked cars. The riot spread deep into Lakeside, and cars were burned and heavily damaged on Madison Street. Other rioters in this clutch broke storefront windows, including those of a McDonald's fast-food restaurant at Jackson and 14th Streets. The night of the riot coincided with trash collection day the following morning and numerous trash dumpsters and containers were parked curbside. Rioters used these dumpsters to start fires along city streets. Rioters damaged some of the carefully restored historic woodwork and terra cotta on the nearly restored Fox Theatre. Damage to the Fox was preliminarily estimated at $10,000 to $20,000.

=== Dellums' appearance and rioting flare up ===
As the rioting moved east toward Lake Merritt, Oakland Mayor Ron Dellums and Larry Reid held an impromptu press conference at 14th and Jackson Streets, along the spine of the rioting, and called for the crowd to disperse peacefully. Dellums peacefully marched with the crowd back West along 14th Street to the steps of City Hall, where he attempted to address the crowd. After the crowd reacted negatively, he cut the meeting short and entered City Hall.

Demonstrators continued through City Hall Plaza, with angry splinter groups of rioters smashing the windows of Oakland Police Department's Internal Affairs and Recruiting Office at the east side of 250 Frank Ogawa Plaza. Windows of police cruisers parked outside the offices were also smashed.

The protesters continued east along 17th Street, crossing Broadway and Franklin, where rioters broke numerous storefront windows, before continuing back into Lakeside, lighting discarded Christmas trees on fire. Police continued their efforts to disperse the crowds, and rioting continued on Broadway downtown.

The rioting wound down around 10:40 p.m. in the vicinity of 20th Street and Broadway outside the Paramount Theatre, where police detained around 80 individuals for various offenses. Most were cited and released for complaints which include inciting a riot, vandalism, assault on a police officer, and arson. Police recovered two handguns from the rioters. Around 120 people in total were arrested for offenses arising from the protests during the course of the evening. Two have been charged to date.

Fruitvale, Lake Merritt, and 12th Street Oakland City Center BART stations were temporarily shut down at various points during the evening.

Numerous media photographers and videographers, both affiliated and independent, filmed the scene from close proximity on the ground. Media helicopters shot video of developments from overhead, which were broadcast in real time on local television stations.

=== Reaction from the business community and city officials ===
The riots augmented the perception of crime in Oakland, adding to the previous year's run of takeover robberies, and were a challenge to overcome for greater economic investment. The Dellums administration held a press conference in City Hall Hearing room 4 on January 8, and decried the riots as regressive. Dellums noted there were riots in the streets of Oakland in 1967, 40 years ago, "and here we are, still smashing cars". Dellums noted that people were upset and had "lost faith in the process" because of what he called lack of communication by BART officials and the district attorney's office in the days after Grant was killed. BART has also been criticized for not ordering Mehserle to speak to internal affairs earlier.

== Criminal trial ==
On January 12, Alameda County District Attorney Tom Orloff filed a complaint for murder and an Alameda County Superior Court Judge signed a fugitive arrest warrant, as Mehserle had left the city. He was arrested January 13 at a friend's home in the Zephyr Cove, Nevada, area near Lake Tahoe. His attorney said Mehserle had gone after receiving death threats in the Bay Area. Mehserle waived extradition, and was held in protective custody at the Santa Rita Jail in Dublin, California. Mehserle pleaded not guilty at his arraignment January 15. On July 9, 2010, the U.S. Justice Department opened a civil rights investigation against Mehserle, but closed the investigation without filing charges.

On January 30, Alameda County Superior Court Judge Morris Jacobson set bail for Mehserle at $3 million. A week later, with the help of fundraising from the police union, Mehserle posted bail.

Alameda County District Attorney Tom Orloff refused to speculate whether Mehserle would be charged with first or second-degree murder, saying "What I feel the evidence indicates is an unlawful killing done by an intentional act and from the evidence we have there's nothing that would mitigate that to something lower than a murder." Orloff noted Mehserle's refusal to explain himself as a reason for charging him with murder, rather than manslaughter. Orloff said he would fight any motion to change venue for the trial.

Mehserle retained Pleasant Hill criminal defense attorney Michael Rains, who previously successfully represented one of the Oakland Riders. Before Mehserle retained Rains, the attorney was quoted as saying that it could be difficult to prosecute Mehserle for murder because the law discourages "second-guessing and hindsighting" of police officers, who tend to be favorably viewed by juries. Mehserle's defense was paid for by a statewide fund for police officers.

=== Bail hearing ===
At a January 30 bail hearing, Rains told the court that Mehserle had carried a Taser for only a few shifts prior to the January 1 shooting, and he mistakenly deployed his service weapon when he thought Grant was reaching for a gun. Rains said, "Mr. Grant was actively, actively, actively resisting arrest." He said that some witnesses heard Mehserle say, "Get back, I'm gonna taze him." Rains said he plans to call witnesses who will show "there was a level of resistance by Oscar Grant and others that will negate malice."

The prosecutors' theory of the case is that the video direct evidence shows that Mehserle deliberately reached for his weapon. They argued: "What we see in the video is an officer releasing his control of a suspect, standing up, drawing his weapon, with some difficulty, and shooting it." Jacobson agreed in deciding to set bail at $3 million that Mehserle's claim of Taser confusion was inconsistent with his earlier statement to a fellow officer, and that Mehserle might be changing his story. He later imposed a gag order on attorneys and investigators in the case, prohibiting them from releasing future filings or otherwise commenting to the press.

=== Preliminary hearing ===
Rains argued during the preliminary hearing that Mehserle lacked the malice necessary for a murder charge and that he intended to tase Grant. A BART officer testified, saying that Grant and his friends had yelled profanities and did not obey her orders to sit down moments before Mehserle fired at Grant. She said she was fearful when she heard taunts coming from Grant, his friends, and passengers on the train. After the seven days of testimony, Judge C. Don Clay concluded that Mehserle had not mistakenly used his service pistol instead of his stun gun. The judge based this on Mehserle's statements to other officers that he thought Grant had a gun. He also noted that Mehserle had held his weapon with both hands, but he was trained to use just his left if he was firing a Taser. Mehserle faced up to life in prison if convicted of first-degree murder.

Rains filed a supplemental motion arguing that Judge Clay should take a second look at a ruling that barred the defense attorney from presenting evidence about Grant's criminal background, as well as a ruling that barred him from presenting evidence that Mehserle told a fellow officer just before the shooting incident that he planned to use his Taser on Grant. He protested that "Both rulings amount to grave errors under longstanding and never-questioned California authorities" and alleged that they "substantially interfere with Mehserle's federal due process right to defend against the murder charge". Rains failed to convince Judge Clay to remove District Attorney Tom Orloff's office from the case. Rains claimed Orloff violated his client's rights because he ordered two Oakland police officers to try to interview Mehserle after he was arrested, even though Orloff knew Mehserle had an attorney. Judge Clay said Orloff's actions did not prove a bias nor did it meet the requirements necessary for him to be removed from the case.

=== Plea and jury selection ===
On June 19, 2009, Mehserle pleaded not guilty. The jury trial was scheduled to begin in October. Mehserle's attorney Michael Rains sought a change of venue of the trial, on the grounds that there would not be an impartial jury in Alameda County. Citing extensive media coverage and the social upheaval of protests and riots, the judge agreed. Rains' request was honored on October 16, and downtown Los Angeles was chosen as the venue on November 19.

Los Angeles County Judge Robert J. Perry was assigned to the case. He said that he would not allow cameras in the courtroom. A hearing was held on February 19, 2010, to address two issues. The judge did not reduce Mehserle's bail, as requested by the defense. The judge also rejected a motion by the defense to remove Alameda County prosecutors from the case. Rains had argued that prosecutors and detectives acted inappropriately when they interviewed Mehserle earlier in the case. Another hearing was set for March 26.

Mehserle's attorney stated that his client did not commit first-degree murder, and asked the judge to instruct the jury to limit its deliberations to either second-degree murder or acquittal. Rains wrote that Mehserle would not argue the killing was conducted in the heat of passion or in self-defense. Rains also argued that prosecutors had shown no evidence that the fatal shooting was either voluntary or involuntary manslaughter.

On May 7, Judge Perry granted a motion by defense to discuss Grant's conviction for possessing a gun and evading arrest. Perry formally selected the jury on June 8 after attorneys had used their motions. The 12-member jury consisted of eight women and four men; of these jurors, seven were white, four Hispanic, and one Asian. Of the alternates, there were five women and one man, consisting of three Asians, two whites, and one Hispanic. It was alleged that six of the jury had law enforcement connections.

Grant's family expressed outrage at the absence of blacks on the jury. The day before the trial began, Deputy District Attorney David Stein revealed a photo that Grant took of Mehserle with a cell phone camera. The photo showed Mehserle pointing a Taser at Grant.

=== Taser confusion ===
Several experts who observed video evidence suggested Mehserle might have confused his gun for his Taser, causing him to mistakenly believe he was tasering Grant. William Lewinski stated this as an expert witness in the case. If Mehserle thought he was firing his Taser, this could provide a full or partial defense to the murder charge. It depended on whether Mehserle had a legal right to use his Taser at all, which was questioned. Prosecutors alleged that paperwork, including a blood alcohol test, completed by Mehserle after the shooting showed that he had changed his story about what occurred.

While there had been previous cases where police officers confused guns with Tasers, modern Tasers weigh half as much as handguns. The prosecution argued that the position of Mehserle's Taser "in relation to his duty weapon, combined with the different 'feel' and color of the two weapons made it highly unlikely that he would have mistaken one for the other". Burris responded to claims of Taser confusion by arguing that video evidence did not support the idea of Taser confusion. In any event, he said, Mehserle had no reason to fire his Taser. Mehserle was wearing his Taser on the left side of his body (on the opposite side from which he wore his gun) – but set up for a cross-body, strong hand (right-hand) draw.

BART purchased the Taser X26 stun guns in September 2008 and provided them to officers after six hours of training, as recommended by the manufacturer.

=== Witness testimony ===
On June 14, Carlos Reyes recalled Mehserle saying, "Oh shit, I shot him" after shooting Grant. Grant's former girlfriend, Sophina Mesa, testified she called Grant while he and his friends were being detained, and he said, "They're beating us up for no reason, I'll call you back." Deputy District Attorney David Stein believed that Grant's phone call proved that he was not trying to resist arrest that night. Cell phone records showed two calls between Grant and Mesa — at 2:05 a.m. and 2:09 a.m. — the latter two minutes before Grant was shot.

On June 15, three eyewitnesses of the account testified that neither Grant nor the other suspects actively resisted the officers at any time. Each expressed disgust at the behavior of officers preceding the shooting that night.

On June 22, Jackie Bryson, a friend of Grant "who was kneeling and handcuffed just inches from Grant when Johannes Mehserle shot him", testified for the prosecution. Bryson said that Grant's hands were under Grant's body and Grant said: "I quit. I surrender." He claimed that Mehserle said "Fuck this" before shooting Grant. Defense attorney Rains repeatedly accused Bryson of lying to convict Mehserle and pointed out a video showing Bryson running toward the train while handcuffed. Responding to Rains' question, "You were going to leave your friend on that platform, weren't you?" Bryson said "I would never leave my friend." Rains accused Bryson of being inconsistent based on his statements in the civil lawsuit he had filed in early January 2009 against BART. Bryson said that he had lied to investigators, distrusted the police, and had been frequently stressed since Grant's killing.

On June 25, Mehserle took the witness stand. Sobbing, he said that he had not thought that he was holding his gun until he heard a pop and looked at his right hand. Responding to a question from Rains, he recalled Grant saying "you shot me" right after the shot went off. Judge Perry called a recess after Grant supporter Timothy Killings shouted out to Mehserle to "save those fucking tears". After another outburst, Killings was arrested for contempt of court.

=== Closing arguments and verdict ===
Judge Perry offered jurors three conviction options: second-degree murder (with a sentence of 15 years to life in prison), voluntary manslaughter (3 to 11 years), or involuntary manslaughter (2 to 4 years); in addition the jury could have decided to acquit. Prosecutor Michael O'Brien said that by shooting Grant, Mehserle inherently committed a crime. Intention meant murder or voluntary manslaughter, and an accident indicated recklessness on Mehserle's part and thus involuntary manslaughter. Judge Perry gave two interpretations of Mehserle's shocked reaction after shooting Grant: either Mehserle had intended to use his Taser or he realized that many people were witnesses to his action.

Closing arguments took place on July 1. Expressing a belief that Mehserle "lost all control" the night he shot Grant and labeled the shooting as an accident to avoid liability, Deputy District Attorney David Stein asked the jury to convict Mehserle of second-degree murder. Defense attorney Rains argued that the shooting was accidental and told them not to make "some sort of commentary on the state of relations between the police and the community in this country". Jury deliberations began on Friday, July 2. The jury had the day off on July 5 because of the Independence Day holiday.

On July 6, deliberations were suspended after one juror left for vacation, having notified the judge in advance, another juror went to a medical appointment, and another called in sick. One new alternate juror joined the panel. One juror submitted a question asking whether provocation by "sources other than the suspect(s)" can make one guilty of voluntary manslaughter. Stein argued that the jury should be able to consider outside influences on Mehserle, but Rains disagreed.

On July 8, 2010, the jury informed the court that they had reached a verdict by 2:10 p.m. The deliberations with this jury panel totaled six and a half hours over the course of two days. At approximately 4:00 p.m., the jury announced that they had found Johannes Mehserle guilty of involuntary manslaughter, and not guilty of charges for second-degree murder or voluntary manslaughter charges. The jury found Mehserle guilty of a gun enhancement charge that could have added up to ten years to his prison sentence, made him ineligible for probation, and required him to serve 85 percent of his sentence, in contrast to the 50 percent that most state prisoners serve.

Having previously been freed on a $3 million bond, Mehserle was remanded into custody after the verdict was read. The next court date, when sentencing would occur, was set for August 6, 2010.

After the verdict, the court released a two-page letter written by Mehserle in which he said: "no words can express how truly sorry I am".

== Sentencing ==
Mehserle was originally scheduled to be sentenced on August 6, 2010 but sentencing was rescheduled for November 5 at the defense's request.

On November 5, 2010, Mehserle was sentenced to two years with double credit for time already served, reducing his term by 292 days for the 146 days he has already spent in jail. The judge overturned the gun enhancement, which could have added an additional 3 to 10 years to the sentence. He was released from prison at 12:01 a.m. on June 13, 2011.

=== Appeal ===
On May 9, 2012, nearly a year after his release from prison, Mehserle appealed his conviction to the First District Court of Appeal in San Francisco. His lawyer, Dylan Schaffer, stated the purpose of this appeal was to allow Mehserle to return to "police work", which was not possible with this conviction on his record. They intended to continue to the state and the U.S. Supreme Court, but in September 2012, the California Supreme Court unanimously denied review of an appellate ruling upholding the conviction.

== Responses ==
=== BART ===
On January 8, 2009, BART's elected directors offered apologies to the victim's family. BART later filed a legal response to the lawsuit that claimed that the shooting was "a tragic accident", and that Grant contributed to the fatal incident. BART said the officers were "just defending themselves" and that "Oscar Grant willfully, wrongfully, and unlawfully made an assault upon defendants and would have beaten, bruised, and ill-treated them if defendants had not immediately defended themselves."

In the days after the shooting, BART held multiple public meetings to ease tensions, led by BART Director Carole Ward Allen. She called on the BART Board to hire two independent auditors to investigate the shooting, and to provide recommendations to the board regarding BART Police misconduct. Director Ward Allen established BART's first Police Department Review Committee and worked with Assemblyman Sandre Swanson to pass AB 1586 in the California State Legislature, which enforced civilian oversight of the BART Police Department. BART board member Lynette Sweet said that "BART has not handled this [situation] correctly," and called for the BART police chief and general manager to step down, but only one other board member, Tom Radulovich, has supported such action.

An investigation was conducted to determine whether any other officers should be disciplined. On January 12, investigation results were forwarded to the district attorney. The investigation, which interviewed seven police officers and 33 other witnesses, came to no conclusion and made no recommendations. The details were forwarded to Meyers Nave, an outside law firm, for an independent investigation. It was led by Jayne Williams, the former city attorney for San Leandro, and was estimated to cost $250,000. In August, the law firm provided two reports to BART but released only one publicly. The report said officers failed to follow recommended procedures, failed to work as a team, and had lapses in both tactical communication and leadership.

KTVU broadcast cell-phone video that showed Pirone striking Grant, resulting in additional agency actions. BART General Manager Dorothy Dugger said a "rigorous" internal affairs investigation would be ordered. Later, an attorney, representing BART and referring to the same video, said that Grant provoked Pirone's blow by trying to knee Pirone at least twice, "It is our position that there was a provocation and assault on Mr. Pirone based upon a video that shows Mr. Grant apparently hitting Mr. Pirone with his knee," On September 22, KTVU reported that Meyers Nave, in its unreleased report, had recommended the termination of Tony Pirone and Marysol Domenici. After being on leave since the incident, Domenici was terminated on March 24, 2010. She was rehired the following December after labor arbitration settled in her favor. Pirone was terminated on April 21 after an internal investigation upheld a finding of misconduct against him. Like Domenici, Pirone later sought to be reinstated through arbitration. This is a process whereby the BART administration and BART police union elect a member of the police union to decide if the firing of Anthony Pirone was justified. This arbitration was delayed, as Pirone served a tour in Afghanistan in the US Army. When he returned, the arbitration was set to finish by the end of 2013, but was delayed until the end of 2014. In December 2014, BART spokesperson Alicia Trost told reporters that Pirone's arbitration was denied, and the arbitrator upheld the termination.

=== Public ===
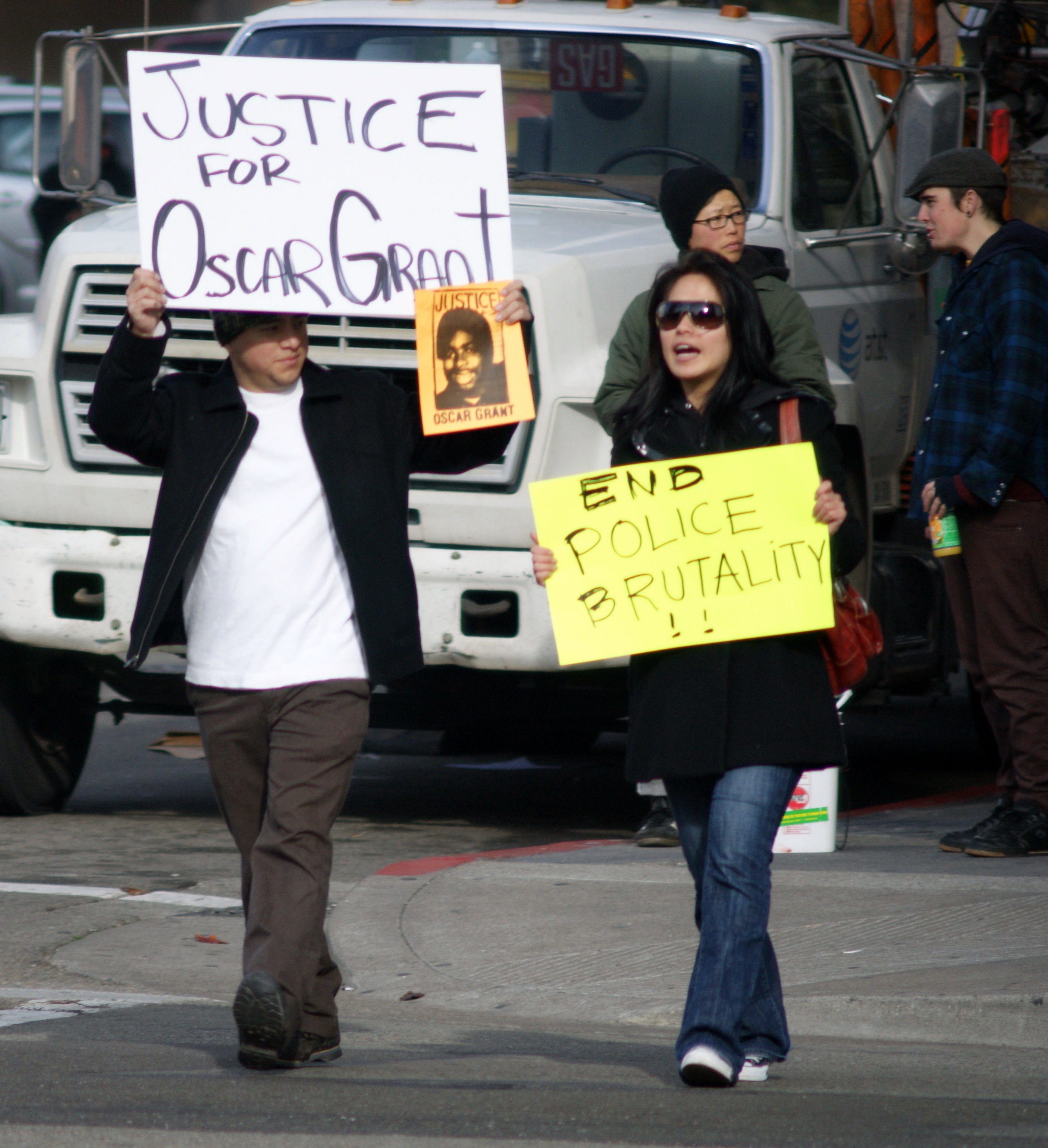
Protesters holding signs on January 8, 2009

Protesters organized several demonstrations and marches in the weeks following the shooting and during court hearings. Alice Huffman, state president of the NAACP, said there was little doubt the shooting was criminal. Many reporters and community organizers stated that racial issues played a role both in the killing and in the community response. Grant's family claimed that officers used racial slurs during the arrest. BART Police Chief Gary Gee remarked that the BART investigation had found no "nexus to race that provoked this to happen".

There was a broad public perception that BART Police were not conducting an effective investigation. Efforts by BART officers to confiscate witnesses' cellphone images during the incident created controversy. The shooting stirred outrage among political leaders and legal observers; Alameda County Supervisor Keith Carson, Oakland City Councilmember Desley Brooks (Eastmont-Seminary), and Berkeley Copwatch labeled the shooting an execution. Local columnists criticized such language as "inflammatory" and "the exact opposite of the kind of sane leadership we need and expect from our elected officials".

When the case went to trial, tensions were provoked because the selected jury contained no Black people.

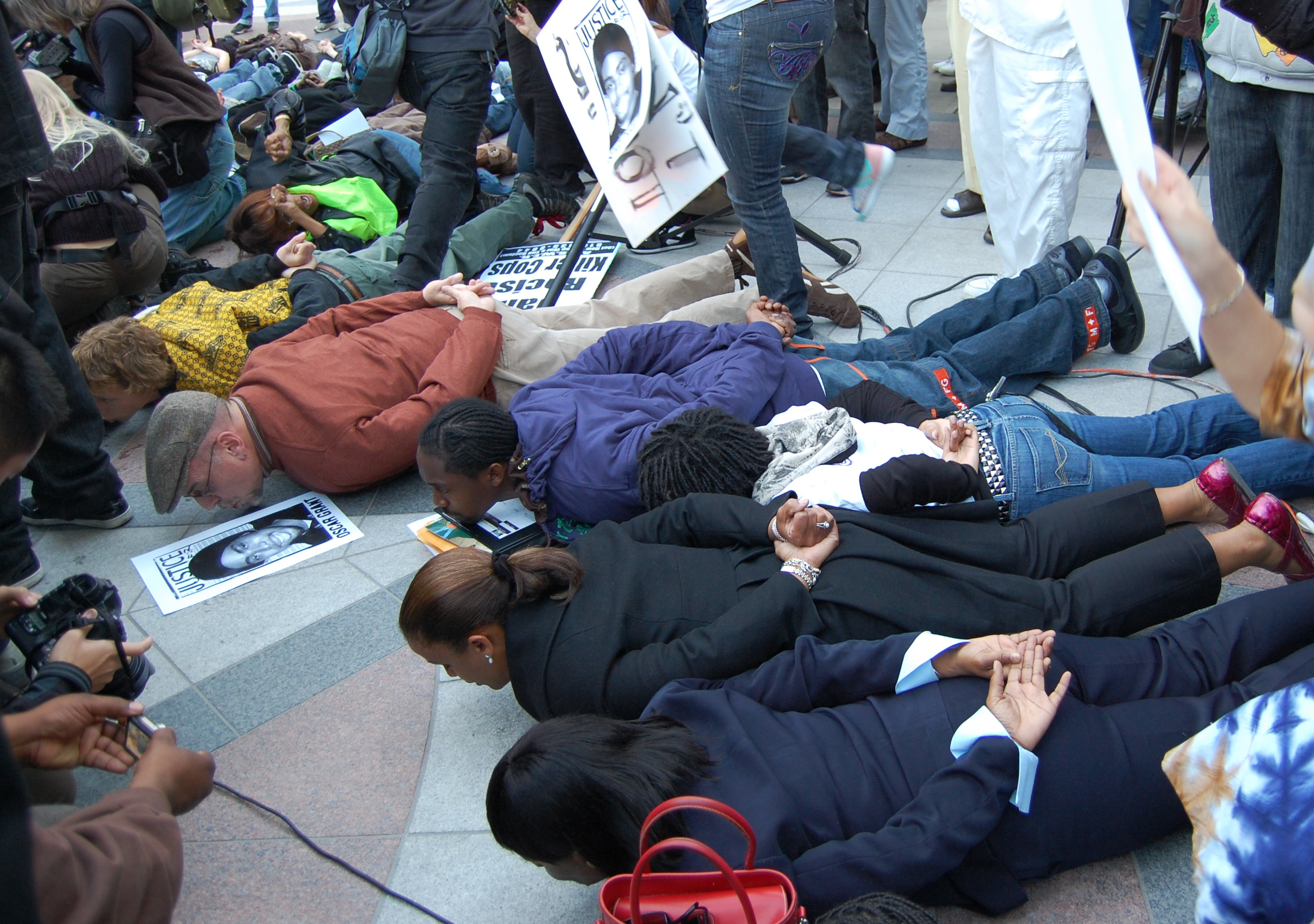
March for Oscar Grant, 14 January 2009

Grant's death has been cited as one of several police killings that contributed to the nationwide Black Lives Matter movement.

=== Protests ===
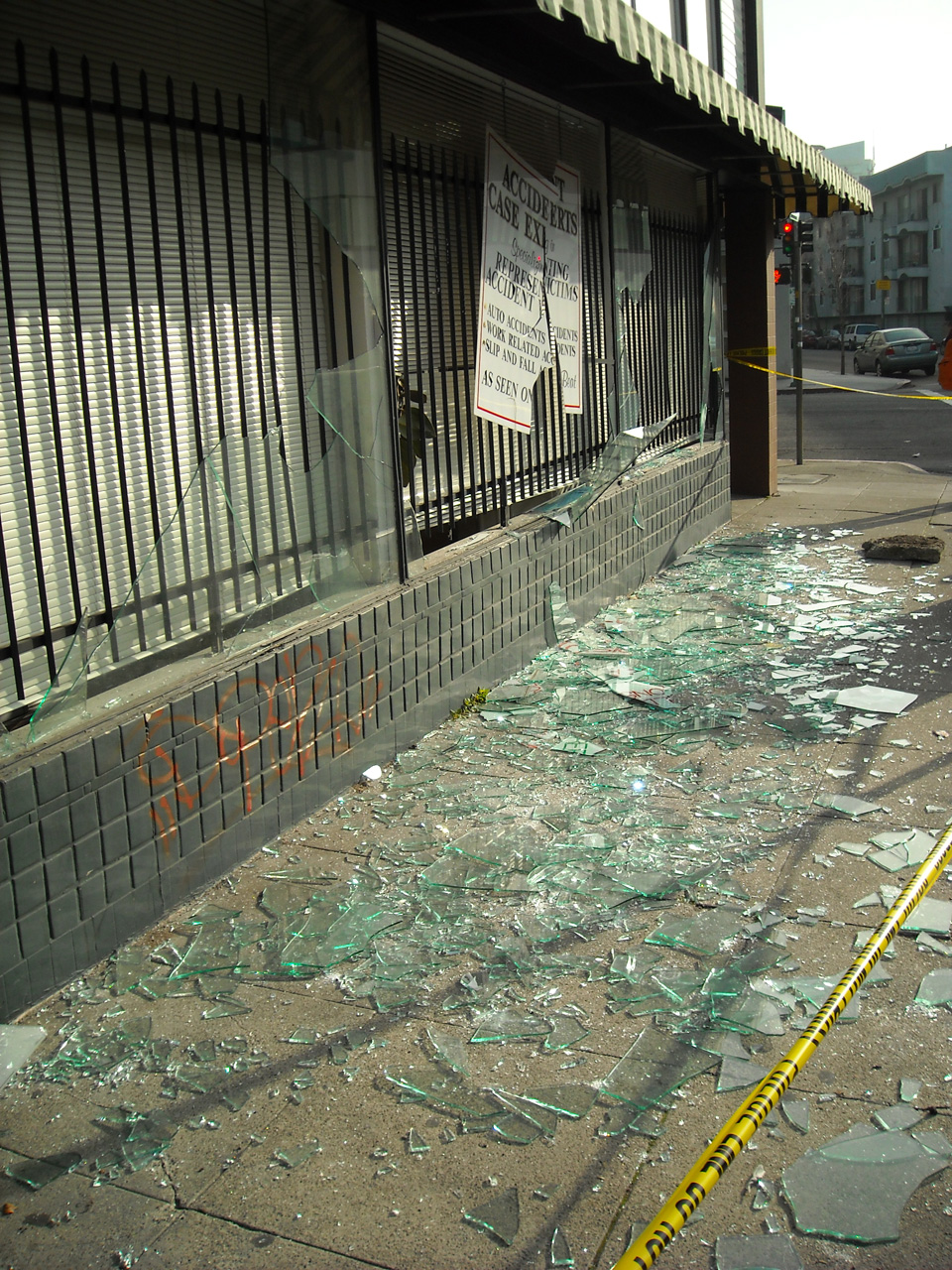
During hours of the unrest, shops were vandalized in Downtown Oakland.

The fatal shooting of Grant was a catalyst for several protests. On January 8, 2009, a protest march in Oakland of about 250 people became violent. Rioters caused more than $200,000 in damages: breaking shop and car windows, burning cars, setting trash bins on fire, and throwing bottles at police officers. Police arrested more than 100 persons. Grant's family pleaded for calm and spoke out against the violence at a press conference the next day. On January 9, police in riot gear dispersed a crowd of about 100 demonstrators after some of the rioters stopped vehicles and threw trash cans in the street.

A January 14 demonstration briefly turned violent, and police arrested 18 people after rioters smashed car and store windows in Oakland's City Center district. Another eight were arrested in a January 30 demonstration after Mehserle's bail hearing, in which he said that he had intended to use his Taser rather than to shoot Grant. Mayor Ron Dellums suggested that Mehserle's right to bail should be abrogated to prevent violence in the community.

Oakland Tribune columnist Tammerlin Drummond criticized the protestors as "self-described 'anarchists,' who aren't even from Oakland, and wannabe Black Panther Party members... playing right into the hands of the defense" by giving Mehserle a plausible case for change of venue.

On May 18, 2009, 100 people protested outside of the Alameda County Courthouse during the preliminary hearing and then marched to the nearby Oakland Police Department. A protest organizer was arrested after the group blocked traffic.

Protests continued throughout the pretrial process. At the hearing on February 19, 2010, some 50 protesters carried signs outside the Los Angeles courthouse. An estimated 200 protesters gathered at San Francisco's Embarcadero BART station on April 8, 2010, to call for the disbanding of the transit system's police department and the firing of an officer who was on the scene when Grant was shot.

On July 8, 2010, following the verdict, protests began peacefully, and officials commended both the protesters and the police for their demonstrated restraint. When the time of the verdict announcement was announced, many people packed BART trains to leave Oakland in fear of unrest, and Interstates 880 and 980 had heavy traffic. Multiple peaceful gatherings were held throughout Oakland after the verdict was announced, and sporadic conflicts were quelled quickly by the police early in the evening. As night fell, people engaged in opportunistic looting of local businesses. Oakland's police chief was quoted as saying that the people doing violence did not primarily seem to be Oakland residents protesting the verdict, but instead were self-styled "anarchists...who are almost professional people who go into crowds like this and cause problems". Oakland police arrested 83 people on a variety of charges, ranging from vandalism to failure to disperse to assault. According to the Oakland Police Chief Batts, nearly 3 out of 4 of those arrested during the protest did not live in Oakland.

The San Francisco Chronicle reported that many of the rioters who were most aggressive in damaging Oakland businesses and property were organized white anarchists wearing black clothing and hoods. An anarchist slogan was painted on one wall that read "Say 'no' to work. Say 'yes' to looting."

Some Oakland officials objected to the "anarchist" label, saying that the outside agitators seemed to lack any cohesive philosophy and were simply bent on making trouble.

== Civil lawsuits ==
Several lawsuits were filed against BART after these events; two made it to trial. Oakland attorney John Burris filed a $25 million wrongful death claim against BART on behalf of Grant's family (mother, daughter, sister and girlfriend) on January 6, 2009.

In February 2009, Burris filed claims for a total of $1.5 million on behalf of five of Grant's friends, whom he says were detained without cause for five hours after the shooting, alleging illegal search and seizure, false arrest, and use of excessive force.

Burris later increased the amount sought by Grant's family to $50 million. The civil case was partially resolved when BART settled with Grant's daughter for $5.1 million (with accrued interest), according to Burris' law firm. BART paid a $1.3 million settlement to Grant's mother. The five friends of Grant settled with BART and received a total of $175,000.

Grant's father, who has been in prison since before Grant was born, separately sued Mehserle for damages related to Grant III's death.

Zeporia Smith, the mother of Johntue Caldwell, a friend of Grant's, filed a suit in 2011 (after her son was killed in a separate incident). She claimed that Officer Marysol Domenici had used excessive force against her son while detaining him on the platform at Fruitvale. Caldwell had testified in a video deposition in 2009 that after Grant III was shot, Officer Domenici dragged Caldwell across the platform, threatened him with a Taser, and shoved him on a departing train.

In 2014 a civil jury heard both the Grant Jr. and Smith cases. On July 1, 2014, the civil jury rejected the claims of Grant's father against Mehserle in the shooting of Grant, as they concluded that his imprisonment had prevented him from having a close relationship with his son.

In the same trial, the jury ruled in favor of Officer Domenici and against Smith. One person said that the lack of a video documenting Caldwell's claim of excessive force had been a determining factor.

== In popular culture ==
- The documentary film Operation Small Axe (2010) focused on police brutality in the Bay Area in the context of the shooting of Grant, and, later that year, of Lovelle Mixon, who was accused of having fatally shot four police officers. Directed and produced by Adimu Madyun, the film won the 2010 Rise Up Award from The Patois International Rights Film Festival in New Orleans. It was written by J.R. Valrey, a volunteer producer and advocacy journalist at San Francisco KPFA-FM.
- The Oakland, California indie rock band Rogue Wave refer to the incident in the song "Solitary Gun" on their 2010 album Permalight: "Stepped off the train and looked for Fruitvale signs. The January air it whips across my spine."
- Oakland jazz composer and trumpeter Ambrose Akinmusire included the track "My Name is Oscar" on his 2011 album When the Heart Emerges Glistening with spoken word lyrics about Oscar's killing: "I am youth / Don't shoot! / Oakland / Live! / My name is Oscar / We are the same".
- In 2011, Seattle-based hip-hop duo Blue Scholars released the album Cinemetropolis, featuring a song called "Oskar Barnack ∞ Oscar Grant", with lyrics centering around filming (Barnack) police activity (Grant).
- In January 2013, filmmaker Ryan Coogler premiered Fruitvale (later retitled Fruitvale Station). The feature drama portrays the last 24 hours of Grant's life, showing him with family, friends and at work. Coogler used some of the eyewitness footage made during the BART incident. Principal photography included locations in Oakland, San Francisco, San Leandro, and San Quentin State Prison. It starred Michael B. Jordan as Oscar, and Octavia Spencer as Oscar's mother Wanda. On January 26, 2013, the film won the U.S. Dramatic Grand Jury Prize as well as the U.S. Dramatic Audience Award at the 2013 Sundance Film Festival.
- In 2014, playwright Chinaka Hodge premiered Chasing Mehserle, a play about Watts, a young man from Oakland who becomes obsessed with chasing down and killing officer Johannes Mehserle.
- In 2017, Angie Thomas published her debut novel, The Hate U Give, which was expanded from a short story she wrote in college in reaction to the shooting of Grant.
- In 2019, Daveed Diggs and Rafael Casal released their album Seven Nights in Chicago. The track "Breath" references the shooting of Oscar Grant.

== See also ==
- List of unarmed African Americans killed by law enforcement officers in the United States
- List of killings by law enforcement officers in the United States
- Slips and capture
