= Smoking gun =

Metaphor for conclusive evidence of an act

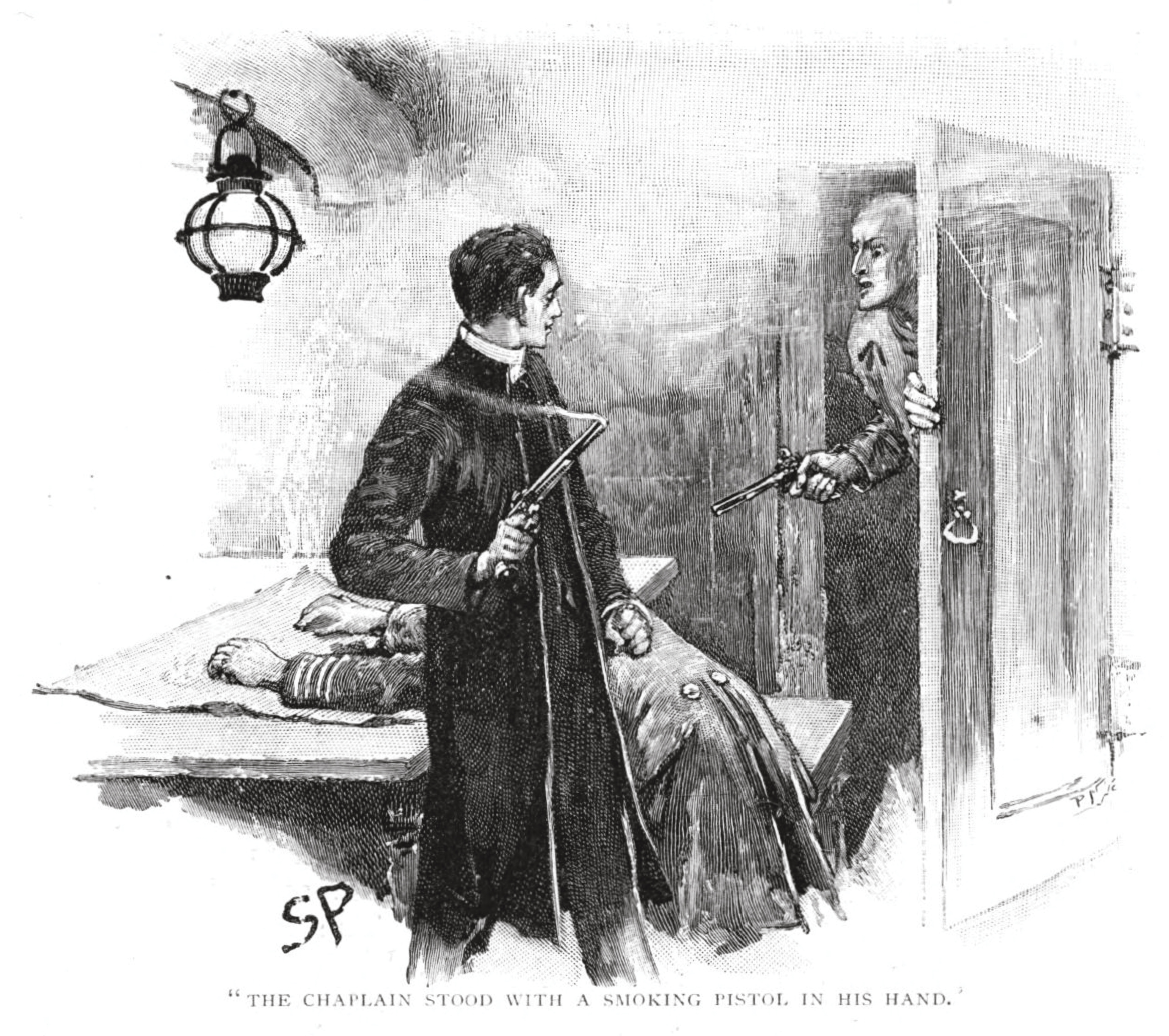
Illustration by Sidney Paget (1893).

The term "smoking gun" refers to an object or fact that serves as conclusive evidence of a crime or similar act, just short of being caught in flagrante delicto. "Smoking gun" refers to the strongest kind of circumstantial evidence, as opposed to direct evidence. Direct evidence would be eyewitness testimony of someone who saw an actus reus (the actual alleged act), while connected events (the preceding chase, etc.) are considered circumstantial.

== Phrase origin ==
The phrase originally came from the idea that finding a very recently fired (hence smoking) gun on the person of a suspect wanted for shooting someone would in that situation be nearly unshakable proof of having committed the crime. A variant of the phrase (as "smoking pistol") is used in the Sherlock Holmes story, "The Adventure of the Gloria Scott" (1893).

== Extended meaning ==
In addition to this, its meaning has evolved in uses completely unrelated to criminal activity: for example, scientific evidence that is highly suggestive in favor of a particular hypothesis is sometimes called "smoking gun evidence".

== See also ==
- Burden of proof (law)
- Incontrovertible evidence
- Nixon White House tapes § "Smoking Gun" tape
