= Fruitvale Station =

2013 film by Ryan Coogler

- Theatrical release poster
- Directed by: Ryan Coogler
- Written by: Ryan Coogler
- Produced by: Nina Yang Bongiovi; Forest Whitaker
- Starring: Michael B. Jordan; Melonie Diaz; Kevin Durand; Chad Michael Murray; Ahna O'Reilly; Octavia Spencer
- Cinematography: Rachel Morrison
- Edited by: Michael P. Shawver; Claudia Castello
- Music by: Ludwig Göransson
- Production company: Significant Productions
- Distributed by: The Weinstein Company
- Release dates: January 19, 2013 (Sundance); July 12, 2013 (United States)
- Running time: 85 minutes
- Country: United States
- Language: English
- Budget: $900,000
- Box office: $17.4 million

Fruitvale Station is a 2013 American biographical drama film written and directed by Ryan Coogler in his feature directorial debut. It is based on the events leading to the death of Oscar Grant, a young man killed in 2009 by Bay Area Rapid Transit (BART) police officer Johannes Mehserle at the Fruitvale district BART station in Oakland, California. The film stars Michael B. Jordan as Grant, with Kevin Durand and Chad Michael Murray playing the two BART police officers involved in Grant's death, although their names were changed for the film. Melonie Diaz, Ahna O'Reilly, and Octavia Spencer also star.

The film debuted under its original title, Fruitvale, at the 2013 Sundance Film Festival, where it won the Grand Jury Prize and the Audience Award for U.S. dramatic film, and was screened in the Un Certain Regard section at the 2013 Cannes Film Festival, where it won the award for Best First Film. It received critical acclaim, and was released in theaters on July 12, 2013, grossing over $17 million against its $900,000 budget.

== Plot ==
The film depicts the last day of the life of Oscar Grant III, a 22-year-old from Hayward, California, before he was fatally shot by BART Police in the early morning hours of January 1, 2009. It begins with actual footage of Oscar and his friends being detained by BART Police at the Fruitvale station in Oakland on January 1, 2009, at 2:15 a.m., right before the shooting.

On December 31, 2008, Oscar and his girlfriend Sophina argue about Oscar’s recent infidelity. He unsuccessfully attempts to get his job back at Farmer Joe's, a grocery store. He briefly considers returning to dealing marijuana, but instead decides to dump his stash. In the evening, he attends a birthday party for his mother, Wanda, and agrees to take the BART train to see fireworks and other New Year's festivities in San Francisco, since she worries about him driving.

On the return train, Katie, a customer at the grocery store where Oscar used to work, recognizes him and calls out his name. This causes a man Oscar knew in prison to notice him, and a fight breaks out. BART police respond to the scene, and Oscar is among the passengers who are detained. While being restrained by officers Caruso and Ingram, Ingram shoots Oscar in the back. A stunned Caruso demands to know what happened. Oscar is rushed to the hospital and dies just hours after undergoing emergency surgery.

Onscreen text describes the aftermath: Oscar's killing sparked a series of protests and riots across the city after several witnesses recorded the incident with cellphones and video cameras. The BART officers involved were fired, and "Ingram" (the officers' names were changed) was later tried and found guilty of involuntary manslaughter, claiming he mistook his gun for his taser, and served an 11-month sentence. The final footage is of a gathering of people celebrating Oscar's life on January 1, 2013, with Grant's daughter, Tatiana, among them.

== Cast ==
- Michael B. Jordan as Oscar Grant III
- Melonie Diaz as Sophina Mesa, Oscar's girlfriend
- Octavia Spencer as Wanda Johnson, Oscar's mother
- Kevin Durand as Officer Caruso (based on Tony Pirone)
- Chad Michael Murray as Officer Ingram (Johannes Mehserle)
- Ahna O'Reilly as Katie, who Oscar helps at Farmer Joe's
- Ariana Neal as Tatiana, Oscar and Sophina's daughter
- Keenan Coogler as Cato, Oscar's friend, who works at Farmer Joe's
- Trestin George as Brandon, Oscar's friend
- Joey Oglesby as Daniel Cale, who had altercations with Oscar both in and out of prison
- Michael James as Carlos, Oscar's friend
- Marjorie Shears as Grandma Bonnie, Oscar's grandmother
- Destiny Ekwueme as Chantay, Oscar's sister
- Bianca Rodriguez as Vanessa, Kris' girlfriend
- Julian Keyes as Kris, Oscar's friend
- Kenny Griffin as Jason, Oscar's friend
- Thomas Wright as Tim, Oscar's friend
- Jemal McNeil as Cephus, Oscar's uncle
- Steven Craig Johnson as Daryl, Oscar's uncle
- Alejandra Nolasco as Officer Salazar (Marysol Domenici)
- Victor Toman as Emi, a manager at Farmer Joe's
- Herman Tsui as Marcus, who used to buy marijuana from Oscar
- Darren Bridgett as Peter, who talks with Oscar while they are waiting for their significant others to use the restroom
- Lucena Herrera as Rose, Sophina's sister
- Razon Tramble as Nurse
- Nassir Zughayer as Sammy, a storeowner who lets Sophina use the restroom on New Year's Eve
- Christina Elmore as Ashae, Lauren's girlfriend
- Tamera Tomakili as Lauren, Ashae's girlfriend

Oscar Grant's real-life mother, Wanda Johnson, has a small role in the film as Mrs. Stacy, Tatiana's preschool teacher.

== Production ==
=== Development ===
Ryan Coogler was a graduate student at the University of Southern California School of Cinematic Arts when Grant was shot on January 1, 2009. Coogler expressed his desire to make a film about Grant's last day: "I wanted the audience to get to know this guy, to get attached, so that when the situation that happens to him happens, it's not just like you read it in the paper, you know what I mean? When you know somebody as a human being, you know that life means something." Coogler met the Grant family's attorney, John Burris, through a mutual friend, and also met with and worked with Grant's family.

In January 2011, Forest Whitaker's production company was looking for new young filmmakers to mentor. Coogler met the Head of Production Nina Yang Bongiovi and showed her his projects. He soon had a meeting with Whitaker, who supported Fruitvale. Coogler met with advisers of the Sundance Screenwriters Lab and developed the script with the help of creative advisors Tyger Williams, Jessie Nelson and Zach Sklar. The film received funding from the Feature Film Program (FFP) and the San Francisco Film Society.

Coogler had Michael B. Jordan in mind to play Grant before writing the script. In April 2012, Jordan and Octavia Spencer joined the cast. Spencer also received a co-executive producer credit as she directly participated in funding the film and contacted investors when a deal was lost during the filming. Notable investors included Kathryn Stockett, author of The Help, a bestselling novel adapted as a successful film, for which Spencer won an Oscar. In April 2012, Hannah Beachler signed on as the film's production designer.

=== Filming ===
Fruitvale Station was shot in Oakland, California, for 20 days in July 2012. Scenes were shot at and around the Bay Area Rapid Transit platform where Grant was killed. BART agreed to let the crew film at Fruitvale station for three four-hour nights. Most of the platform scenes were shot over the course of two nights (with another night dedicated to the sequences on the train that led up to the police confrontation). San Quentin State Prison served as a filming location for a flashback scene with prisoners featured as extras. The film was shot in Super 16 mm format using Arriflex 416 cameras and Zeiss Ultra 16 lenses.

The film includes actual amateur footage of the shooting, which Coogler initially did not want to use:

I didn't want any real footage in the film. But you sometimes have to take a step back. Being from the Bay Area, I knew that footage like the back of my hand, but more people from around the world had no idea about this story. It made sense for them to see that footage and see what happened to Oscar, and I think it was a responsibility that we had to put that out there.

=== Soundtrack ===
The film's musical score is by Coogler's fellow USC graduate Ludwig Göransson, who said of the scoring process:

Ryan and I talked a lot about how sound design was going to have a huge role in the movie and very early on I got sent the actual sound recordings of the BART train. I manipulated the train sound and made it almost feel like a dark ambient synth sound and I used it almost throughout the whole BART platform scene. The other element in the score is lots of layered and manipulated guitars sounding almost like haunting pads.

Coogler added:

One thing that we always wanted to be conscious of with the score was to make sure that it always felt organic. A lot of the film would play without score, so Ludwig made sure that whenever we brought score in came out of sounds in the environment.

A soundtrack album, Fruitvale Station: Original Motion Picture Soundtrack, was released through Lakeshore Records, digitally on September 24, 2013, and on CD on October 15.

Track listing
No.	Title	Artist	Length
1.	"Mob Shit"	The Jacka, Cellski & Peezy	4:40
2.	"Rubber Band"	Mar Keyes, William Peoples & Noah Coogler	4:04
3.	"Won't Be Right"	The Jacka & Cellski	4:13
4.	"Hey Little Mama"	Mistah F.A.B, Johnny Ca$h & The Jacka	3:56
5.	"Intelligent"	Mar Keyes, William Peoples & Phillip Henderson	3:25
6.	"Tatiana"	Ludwig Göransson	1:13
7.	"Emi"	Ludwig Göransson	0:47
8.	"The Dog"	Ludwig Göransson	1:18
9.	"Prison"	Ludwig Göransson	1:00
10.	"Picking Up T"	Ludwig Göransson	0:44
11.	"Undefeated"	Ludwig Göransson	0:26
12.	"Love and Oprah"	Ludwig Göransson	0:36
13.	"Dinner Time"	Ludwig Göransson	1:38
14.	"Tatiana and Firecrackers"	Ludwig Göransson	1:13
15.	"Gumbo"	Ludwig Göransson	0:46
16.	"Bart Station"	Ludwig Göransson	5:00
17.	"Who's That For?"	Ludwig Göransson	2:30
18.	"End Titles"	Ludwig Göransson	6:47
19.	"Fruitvale Suite"	Ludwig Göransson	7:53
Total length:			52:09

== Marketing ==
The Weinstein Company commissioned three murals to be painted in Los Angeles, New York, and San Francisco by street artists Ron English, Lydia Emily, and LNY in anticipation of the film.

Some people questioned the decision to have a poster for the film in the actual Fruitvale Station, but a BART spokeswoman said:

There was no debate whether to allow Fruitvale Station [advertisements] on BART. None whatsoever. We really support Ryan. He's just an amazing person ... I think that Ryan had said it was his intention to show his love for Oakland and the people of Oakland, and he really succeeded.

Promotional material used on the film's Facebook page and website referred to the controversial killing of Trayvon Martin in Florida, which was in the news at the time of the film's release. This drew some criticism, with publicist Angie Meyer stating: "It's absolutely inappropriate and morally wrong to use a high-profile case to create publicity and buzz around a movie release."

As part of its film promotion, the Weinstein Co. set up the "I am __" campaign to encourage people to share stories of overcoming acts of social injustice or mistreatment, and to upload photos or other artworks related to those experiences.

== Release ==
=== Theatrical ===
Fruitvale Station premiered on January 19, 2013, at the Sundance Film Festival, where it was screened as Fruitvale, its original title. It became the center of a bidding war that included studios such as Fox Searchlight, Paramount Pictures, Focus Features, and CBS Films, with The Weinstein Company ultimately acquiring the film's distribution rights for about $2 million. In May 2013, Fruitvale Station appeared at the 66th Cannes Film Festival in the Un Certain Regard section, which recognizes unique and innovative films, and won the award for Best First Film.

The film's Oakland premiere was a private screening held at the Grand Lake Theater on June 20, 2013, and it opened in select additional markets on July 12, about the same time as the verdict in the trial of George Zimmerman for shooting Trayvon Martin.

=== Home media ===
Fruitvale Station was made available in Digital HD via Anchor Bay on December 31, 2013. DVD and Blu-ray combo packs were released on January 14, 2014.

== Reception and legacy ==
=== Box office ===
The film grossed an estimated $127,445 on the first day of its limited theatrical release and ended the weekend with a gross of $377,285 from seven theaters, for a per-theater average of $53,898. This was the third-highest opening of the year for a film in limited release (behind Spring Breakers and The Place Beyond the Pines), and one of the best openings for a Sundance festival top prize winner. A week after its debut, Fruitvale Station expanded to 35 theaters and earned $742,272, for a $21,832 per-screen average.

On July 26, the film opened nationwide in more than 1,000 locations. It ranked #10 at the weekend box office, earning $4.59 million. In total, the film has grossed $16,101,339 in the United States and $1,284,491 elsewhere, for a worldwide box office total of $17,385,830.

=== Critical reception ===
On review aggregator website Rotten Tomatoes, 94% of 216 critics' reviews of the film are positive, with an average score of 8.1/10; the site's "critics consensus" states: "Passionate and powerfully acted, Fruitvale Station serves as a celebration of life, a condemnation of death, and a triumph for star Michael B. Jordan." On Metacritic, the film has a weighted average score of 85 out of 100 based on reviews from 46 critics, indicating "universal acclaim". Audiences polled by CinemaScore gave the film an average grade of A on an A+ to F scale.

Todd McCarthy of The Hollywood Reporter called the film "a compelling debut" and "a powerful dramatic feature film". He also praised the lead performances, writing that, "As Oscar, Jordan at moments gives off vibes of a very young Denzel Washington in the way he combines gentleness and toughness; he effortlessly draws the viewer in toward him. Diaz is vibrant as his patient and loyal girlfriend, while Spencer brings her gravitas to the proceedings as his stalwart mother."

Writing for The Village Voice, chief film critic Stephanie Zacharek called Fruitvale Station "a restrained but forceful picture that captures some of the texture and detail of one human life", and praised Coogler, writing that he "dramatizes Oscar's last day by choosing not to dramatize it: The events unfold casually, without any particular scheme. And yet because we know how this story will end, there's a shivery, understated tension running beneath."

In his Sundance festival wrap-up, critic Kenneth Turan of the Los Angeles Times wrote of the film: "Made with assurance and quiet emotion, this unexpectedly devastating drama based on the real life 2009 shooting of an unarmed young black man at an Oakland Fruitvale Station of BART (San Francisco Bay Area Rapid Transit System - Fruitvale Station) impressed everyone as the work of an exceptional filmmaker."

In a more mixed review, Geoff Berkshire of Variety called the film "a well-intentioned attempt to put a human face on the tragic headlines surrounding Oscar Grant." He praised Jordan's performance, but critiqued the "relentlessly positive portrayal" of the film's subject, saying: "Best viewed as an ode to victim's rights, Fruitvale forgoes nuanced drama for heart-tugging, head-shaking and rabble-rousing."

The film appeared on several critics' top ten lists of the best films of 2013:

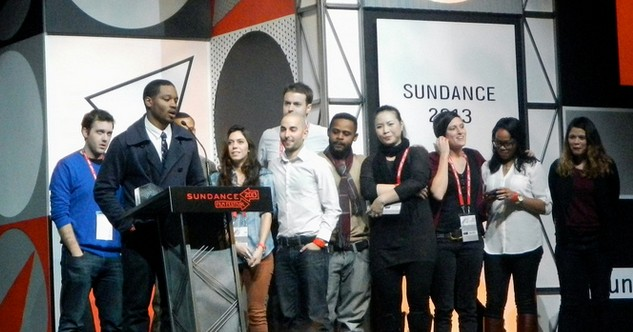
Ryan Coogler accepts the U.S. Grand Jury Prize: Dramatic with the crew at the 2013 Sundance Film Festival.

- 2nd – Matt Zoller Seitz, RogerEbert.com
- 3rd – Betsy Sharkey, Los Angeles Times
- 3rd – Mara Reinstein, Us Weekly
- 4th – Owen Gleiberman, Entertainment Weekly
- 4th – Chris Nashawaty, Entertainment Weekly
- 5th – Michael Phillips, Chicago Tribune
- 8th – Lisa Schwarzbaum, BBC
- 8th – Joe Neumaier, New York Daily News
- 9th – Ann Hornaday, The Washington Post
- 9th – Randy Myers, San Jose Mercury News
- 9th – Anne Thompson, Indiewire
- 9th – Sasha Stone, Awards Daily
- No rank – Joe Morgenstern, Wall Street Journal
- No rank – Kenneth Turan, Los Angeles Times
- No rank – Claudia Puig, USA Today
- No rank – Carrie Rickey
- No rank – Jonathan Rosenbaum

Actor Joseph Gordon-Levitt praised the film as the "best film" of the 2013 Sundance Film Festival, and singer Billie Eilish has stated that it is her favorite film four years in a row in her annual Vanity Fair interview.

=== Accolades ===
Award	Date of ceremony	Category	Recipients and nominees	Result
AACTA Awards	January 10, 2014	Best International Supporting Actress	Octavia Spencer	Nominated
African-American Film Critics Association	December 13, 2013	Best Independent Film	Fruitvale Station	Won
American Film Institute	January 10, 2014	Top Ten Films of the Year	Fruitvale Station	Won
Austin Film Critics Association	December 17, 2013	Best First Film	Ryan Coogler	Won
Black Reel Awards	February 13, 2014	Outstanding Motion Picture	Fruitvale Station / Nina Yang Bonogivoi and Forest Whitaker	Nominated
Black Reel Awards	February 13, 2014	Outstanding Actor	Michael B. Jordan	Nominated
Black Reel Awards	February 13, 2014	Outstanding Supporting Actress	Melonie Diaz	Nominated
Black Reel Awards	February 13, 2014	Outstanding Supporting Actress	Octavia Spencer	Nominated
Black Reel Awards	February 13, 2014	Outstanding Director	Ryan Coogler	Nominated
Black Reel Awards	February 13, 2014	Outstanding Screenplay (Original or Adapted)	Ryan Coogler	Nominated
Black Reel Awards	February 13, 2014	Outstanding Ensemble	The cast of Fruitvale Station	Nominated
Black Reel Awards	February 13, 2014	Outstanding Score	Ludwig Göransson	Nominated
Black Reel Awards	February 13, 2014	Outstanding Breakthrough Actress Performance	Melonie Diaz	Nominated
Boston Online Film Critics Association	December 8, 2013	Best New Filmmaker	Ryan Coogler	Won
Cannes Film Festival	May 25, 2013	Prix de l'Avenir d'Un Certain Regard	Ryan Coogler	Won
Cannes Film Festival	May 25, 2013	Grand Prix d'Un Certain Regard	Ryan Coogler	Nominated
Cannes Film Festival	May 25, 2013	Camera d'Or	Ryan Coogler	Nominated
Carmel Art and Film Festival	October 12, 2013	Breakout Actress of 2013	Melonie Diaz	Won
Central Ohio Film Critics	January 2, 2014	Best Actor	Michael B. Jordan	Nominated
Central Ohio Film Critics	January 2, 2014	Breakthrough Film Artist	Ryan Coogler	Nominated
Chicago Film Critics Association	December 16, 2013	Most Promising Filmmaker	Ryan Coogler	Nominated
Dallas-Fort Worth Film Critics Association	December 6, 2013	Russell Smith Award	Fruitvale Station	Won
Deauville American Film Festival	September 2013	Prix du Jury Révélation Cartier	Fruitvale Station	Won
Deauville American Film Festival	September 2013	Prix du Public	Fruitvale Station	Won
Denver Film Critics Society	January 13, 2014	Best Supporting Actress	Octavia Spencer	Nominated
Detroit Film Critics Society	December 13, 2013	Best Breakthrough	Ryan Coogler	Nominated
Detroit Film Critics Society	December 13, 2013	Best Breakthrough	Michael B. Jordan	Nominated
Florida Film Critics Circle	December 18, 2013	Pauline Kael Breakout Award	Michael B. Jordan	Runner-Up
Gotham Awards	December 2, 2013	Bingham Ray Breakthrough Director Award	Ryan Coogler	Won
Gotham Awards	December 2, 2013	Breakthrough Actor	Michael B. Jordan	Won
Gotham Awards	December 2, 2013	Audience Award	Fruitvale Station	Nominated
Hollywood Film Festival	18–20 October 2013	Hollywood Spotlight Award	Michael B. Jordan	Won
Houston Film Critics Society	December 15, 2013	Best Picture	Fruitvale Station	Nominated
Houston Film Critics Society	December 15, 2013	Best Supporting Actress	Octavia Spencer	Nominated
Humanitas Prize	September 20, 2013	Sundance Feature Film Category	Fruitvale Station	Won
Independent Spirit Awards	March 1, 2014	Best First Feature	Fruitvale Station / Ryan Coogler	Won
Independent Spirit Awards	March 1, 2014	Best Male Lead	Michael B. Jordan	Nominated
Independent Spirit Awards	March 1, 2014	Best Supporting Female	Melonie Diaz	Nominated
Indiana Film Critics Association	December 16, 2013	Best Picture	Fruitvale Station	Nominated
Indiana Film Critics Association	December 16, 2013	Best Actor	Michael B. Jordan	Nominated
Indiana Film Critics Association	December 16, 2013	Best Supporting Actress	Octavia Spencer	Nominated
Las Vegas Film Critics Society	December 18, 2013	Breakout Filmmaker of the Year	Ryan Coogler	Won
NAACP Image Awards	February 22, 2014	Outstanding Motion Picture	Fruitvale Station	Nominated
NAACP Image Awards	February 22, 2014	Outstanding Actor in a Motion Picture	Michael B. Jordan	Nominated
NAACP Image Awards	February 22, 2014	Outstanding Supporting Actress in a Motion Picture	Octavia Spencer	Nominated
NAACP Image Awards	February 22, 2014	Outstanding Independent Motion Picture	Fruitvale Station	Won
NAACP Image Awards	February 22, 2014	Outstanding Writing in a Motion Picture	Ryan Coogler	Nominated
Nantucket Film Festival	July 1, 2013	Vimeo Award for Best Writer/Director	Ryan Coogler	Won
National Board of Review	December 4, 2013	Top Ten Films	Fruitvale Station	Won
National Board of Review	December 4, 2013	Best Supporting Actress	Octavia Spencer	Won
National Board of Review	December 4, 2013	Breakthrough Actor	Michael B. Jordan	Won
National Board of Review	December 4, 2013	Best Directorial Debut	Ryan Coogler	Won
New York Film Critics Circle	December 3, 2013	Best First Film	Fruitvale Station	Won
New York Film Critics Online	December 8, 2013	Best Debut Director	Ryan Coogler	Won
Phoenix Film Critics Society	December 17, 2013	Breakthrough Performance on Camera	Michael B. Jordan	Nominated
Phoenix Film Critics Society	December 17, 2013	Breakthrough Performance Behind the Camera	Ryan Coogler	Nominated
Producers Guild of America	January 19, 2014	Stanley Kramer Award	Fruitvale Station	Won
San Francisco Film Critics Circle	December 15, 2013	Best Supporting Actress	Octavia Spencer	Nominated
San Francisco Film Critics Circle	December 15, 2013	Marlon Riggs Award	Ryan Coogler	Won
Santa Barbara International Film Festival	February 4, 2014	Virtuoso Award	Michael B. Jordan	Won
Satellite Awards	March 9, 2014	Breakthrough Award Performance	Michael B. Jordan	Won
Satellite Awards	March 9, 2014	Honorary Satellite Award	Ryan Coogler	Won
St. Louis Gateway Film Critics Association	December 16, 2013	Best Actor	Michael B. Jordan	Nominated
Stockholm International Film Festival	November 15, 2013	Best First Film	Fruitvale Station	Won
Sundance Film Festival	January 26, 2013	Audience Award: U.S. Dramatic	Ryan Coogler	Won
Sundance Film Festival	January 26, 2013	Grand Jury Prize: U.S. Dramatic	Ryan Coogler	Won
Traverse City Film Festival	August 4, 2013	Audience Award – Best American Film	Fruitvale Station	Won
Washington D.C. Area Film Critics Association	December 9, 2013	Best Supporting Actress	Octavia Spencer	Nominated
Women Film Critics Circle	December 17, 2013	Best Actor	Michael B. Jordan	Runner-Up
Zurich Film Festival	October 6, 2013	Best International Feature Film	Fruitvale Station	Nominated
Zurich Film Festival	October 6, 2013	Best Actor – Special Mention	Michael B. Jordan	Won

== See also ==
- List of African American films of the 2010s

Awards
Preceded by Beasts of the Southern Wild	Sundance Grand Jury Prize: U.S. Dramatic; 2013	Succeeded by Whiplash
