= Bay Area Rapid Transit Police Department =

Transit police agency of the BART rail system in the U.S. state of California

Bay Area Rapid Transit District Police Department
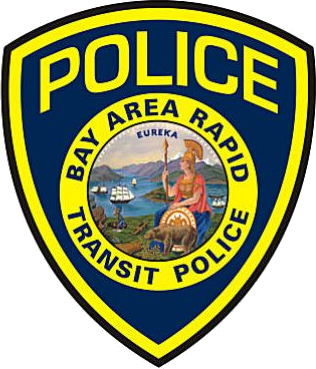
- Current patch of the BART Police Department

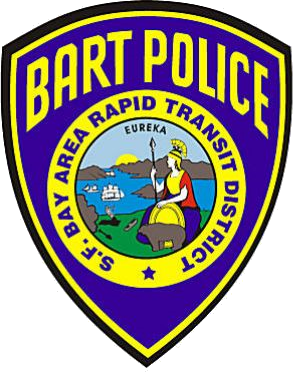
- Former patch of the BART Police Department
- Common name: BART Police
- Abbreviation: BARTPD

Agency overview
- Formed: 1972

Jurisdictional structure
- Operations jurisdiction: California, United States
- Area: 2,667.49 sq mi (6,908.8 km^{2}) (land area in 4 counties)
- Population: 4,082,982 (4 county area)
- Legal jurisdiction: San Francisco Bay Area, California
- Governing body: BARTD

Operational structure
- Headquarters: Oakland, California, U.S.
- Officers: 206
- Unsworn members: 90
- Agency executive: Kevin Franklin, Chief of Police
- Divisions: 5

Facilities
- Stations: 50

Website
- www.BART.gov

The BART Police (BARTPD), officially the Bay Area Rapid Transit Police Department, is the transit police agency of the BART rail system in the U.S. state of California. The department has approximately three hundred police personnel, including over two hundred sworn peace officers. The chief, Kevin Franklin commands the agency's law enforcement, parking, and community relations services. BART Police participates in a mutual aid agreement with other Bay Area law enforcement agencies. In 2011 and 2012 the department came under national scrutiny due to several officers involved in fatalities of the rail system's patrons.

When terrorism began to be treated as a more active threat after the September 11 attacks, BART increased its emphasis on infrastructure protection. The police department hosts drills and participates in counter-terrorism working groups. The agency has an officer assigned full-time to the FBI's Joint Terrorism Task Force. Furthermore, a command officer is designated as a mutual-aid, counter-terrorism, and homeland-security liaison. BART's police dogs are certified in explosives detection.

The stated goal of the BART Police Department is to build a more community-oriented police force that is tough on crime and strong on customer service. Zone commanders and their personnel form working partnerships with BART riders, employees, community groups, educational institutions, and businesses. The goal is to ensure that personal safety, quality of life, and protection of property remain among BART's top priorities for the stakeholders in its community.

== History ==
In 1969, three years before BART opened for revenue service, the transit district's board of directors recommended that local police and sheriff's departments patrol the stations, trains, rights-of-way, and other BART-owned properties that were within their respective jurisdictions. The police chiefs and sheriffs, forecasting that BART's proposal would create jurisdictional disputes and inconsistent levels of police service, rejected the board's proposal. As a result, legislation was passed to form an autonomous law enforcement agency, the BART Police Department.

During BART's first 13 years of revenue service, police officers reported to the transit district's headquarters in Oakland. In 1985, a team of officers was assigned to report to the Concord transportation facility, where a police field office was established. By not having to travel the 20 miles between Oakland and Concord, the officers were able to patrol their beats longer and become more familiar with the community. BART riders, station agents, and train operators benefited from having more police presence and interaction with the same officers. This led to three additional field offices within six months.

In July 1993, then-police chief Harold Taylor recommended a comprehensive plan to decentralize the department into four geographical police zones, each with its own headquarters and field offices. Zone commanders would be given personnel, equipment, and resources to manage their respective police operations. A peer-review panel, which included four police chiefs and the safety-audit administrator from the American Public Transportation Association, gave Chief Taylor's plan its endorsement, along with other recommendations on how the BART police could work more closely with other transit employees, communities, businesses, and schools that the transit district serves.

Police command-level officers provide input to planners for BART's future extensions to Warm Springs and Santa Clara County.

BART Police formerly had an eagle-top shield type badge, but in April 2011 switched to the 7-point star style traditional to Bay Area law enforcement. Uniforms are dark blue, similar to SFPD.

Officers are only issued SIG Sauer P320 pistols by the department, but have the option of using firearms approved by the department at their own expense.

=== Officer-involved fatalities ===
==== Bruce Edward Seward ====
In 2001, a mentally ill man named Bruce Edward Seward was shot by an officer at the Hayward Station. Reportedly the sleeping passenger awoke and grabbed the officer's nightstick causing the officer to reflexively shoot him; resulting in death.

==== Oscar Grant ====
In 2009, officer Johannes Mehserle fatally shot Oscar Grant III on the Fruitvale station.

Eyewitnesses gathered direct evidence of the shooting with cellular video cameras which were later submitted to social networks such as YouTube in addition to media outlets. The videos were watched hundreds of thousands of times online. In the days following the shooting, peaceful and violent demonstrations occurred.

After an investigation and public uproar, Mehserle was arrested and charged with second-degree murder, to which he pleaded not guilty. He was convicted of involuntary manslaughter in 2010 and was sentenced to two years. Mehserle served his sentence at the Los Angeles County Jail and was released in 2011 on parole.

Subsequent to the criminal trial Oakland civil rights attorney John Burris filed a US$25 million wrongful death civil lawsuit against BART on behalf of Grant's daughter and girlfriend.

In response to the Grant shooting, BART created a civilian oversight committee to monitor police-related incidents. The civilian oversight of the BART Police Department is directly attributable to the leadership of Assemblyman Sandre Swanson who authored the legislation, BART director Carole Ward Allen who lobbied members of the California state legislature to create an oversight committee with an Independent Auditor position, and Governor Arnold Schwarzenegger who signed the bill into law.

==== Charles Hill ====
In 2011, a mentally ill homeless man, Charles Blair Hill, assaulted two officers with weapons at the Civic Center / UN Plaza station in San Francisco. As a result, he was shot by BART police. The department reported that Hill was drunk and armed with two knives and a broken bottle. Approximately twenty-three seconds after arriving on scene, the officers fired three rounds, striking Hill in the chest and killing him. BART Police chief Kenton Rainey stated lethal force was appropriate.

The shooting of Charles Hill led to a non-violent but disruptive demonstration by approximately seventy-five protesters inside the Civic Center and 16th Street Stations on July 11. Demonstrators departing the 16th St Mission station returned downtown on Mission St, blocking traffic and engaging in acts of vandalism en route. One citizen was arrested for intoxication.

==== Sahleem Tindle ====
Officer Joseph Mateu shot and killed Sahleem Tindle in January 2018. Officer Mateu had heard shots, and ran to the scene where two men were fighting over a gun. He intervened, firing into Tindle's back three times. The shooting resulted in a civil rights lawsuit against BART. Prosecutors wound up declining to file any charges.

=== Cell phone network shutdown ===
On August 11, 2011, BART officials successfully prevented another evening-commute anti-police demonstration by shutting down the public cell phone network serving their jurisdiction in and between the downtown San Francisco stations. The police had received information that the protest was to be coordinated live via internet and text messages. This was the first documented instance of any government agency in the United States shutting down public communications to disrupt a protest. The American Civil Liberties Union called the decision "in effect an effort by a governmental entity to silence its critics."

== Operations ==
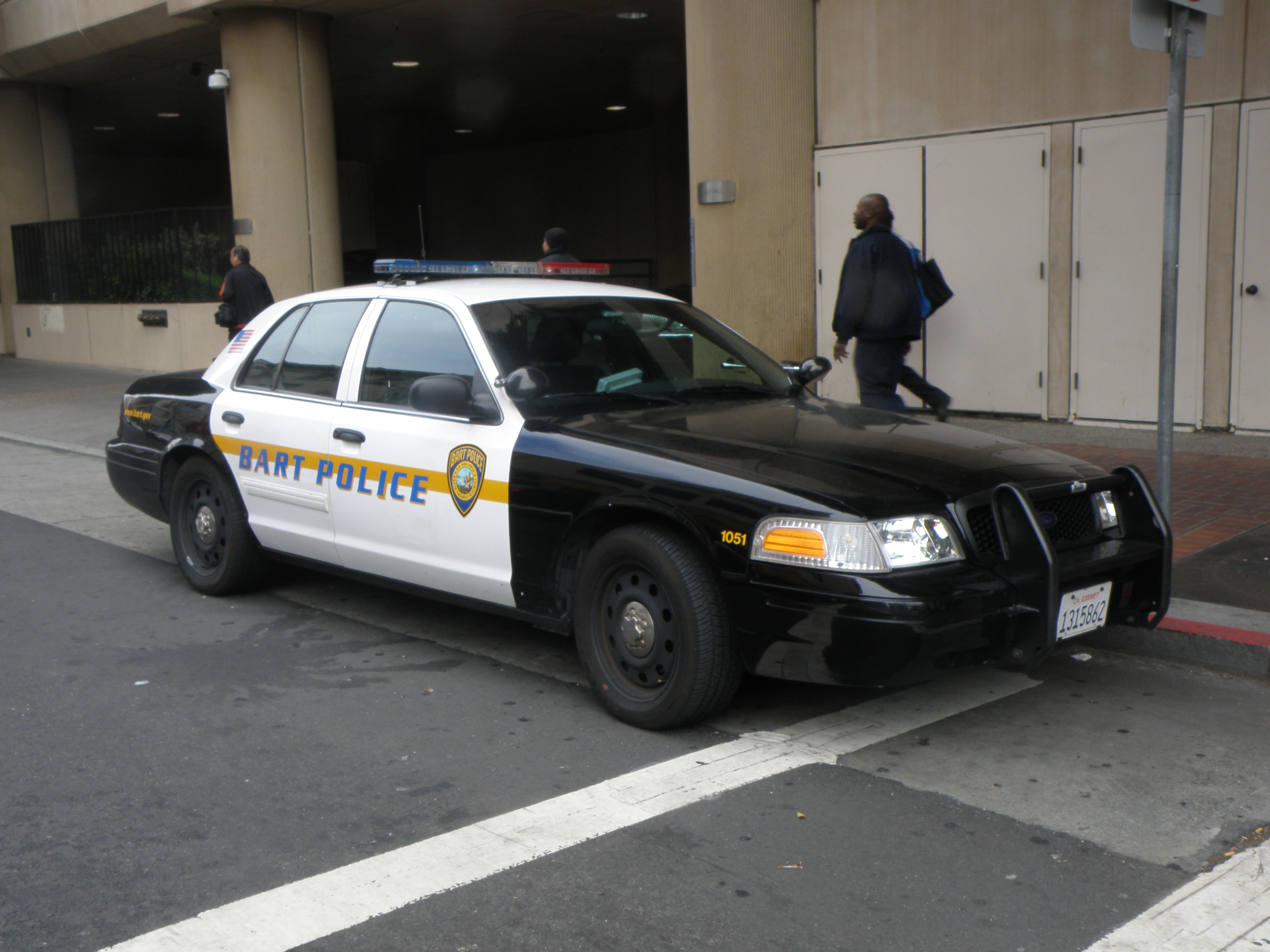
A Ford Crown Victoria Police Interceptor of BART Police

The BART police have various positions in their ranks. including peace officers, community service officers, dispatchers, revenue protection guards, and administrative staff. Most officers are assigned to patrol, and others are assigned to special operations teams.

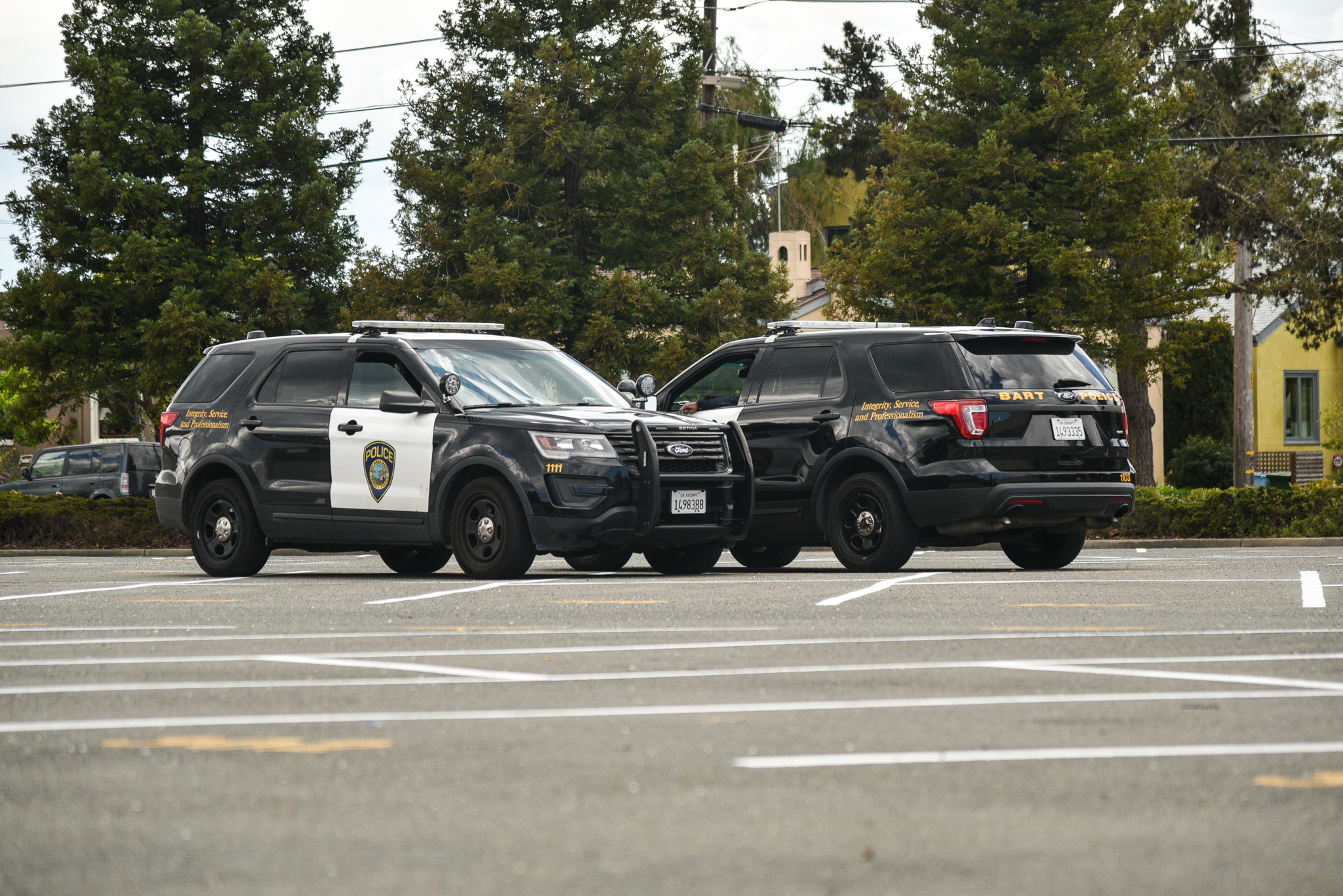
Two BART Police cars in the parking lot of the North Berkeley BART station.

The department's decentralized patrol bureau is divided into six police zones. Each has its own headquarters and field office(s). The police department has: criminal investigation, personnel and training, record, warrant, crime analysis, traffic administration, property and evidence, and revenue protection divisions. There is also the office of the chief which is composed of an internal affairs and a budget coordination office.

Further specialties for the police department include: field training officer, K9, background investigations, crime analyst, administrative traffic officer, FBI Joint Terrorism Task Force (JTTF) investigator, special-enforcement teams, recruiting and personnel, and crisis intervention teams.

The agency has police facilities in: Castro Valley, Daly City, Concord, El Cerrito, Hayward, Oakland, Pittsburg, Pleasanton, San Bruno, San Francisco, San Leandro, Fremont, San Jose, and Walnut Creek.

== Fatality ==
One BART police officer has died in the line of duty.

Officer	Date of death	Details
Detective Sgt. Tom Smith	Tuesday, January 21, 2014	Gunfire (friendly fire)

== See also ==
- New York City Transit Police
- South Coast British Columbia Transportation Authority Police Service
