= Oakland Aviation High School =

High school in Oakland, California, US

- 7850 Earhart Road; Oakland, CA 94621

Information
- Type: Public high school (Specialized/Non-SHSAT)
- Motto: "Where Dreams Take Flight!"
- Established: 2005
- Closed: 2011
- Principal: Constance Senna-Spinnato (last)
- Faculty: 8.0 FTEs
- Grades: 9–12
- Enrollment: 125 (as of 2010–11)
- Student to teacher ratio: 20:1
- Mascot: Lions
- Nickname: "Aviation"
- Website: www.aviationhighschool.org

Oakland Aviation High School was a public charter high school in Oakland, California.

== History ==
The Oakland Aviation High School Design Team was formed in 2002 through a partnership with Oakland Community Organizations, the Port of Oakland, and the College of Alameda with participation and support from the Tuskegee Airmen, Western Aerospace Museum, Oakland Unified School District, and EC Reems Academy of Technology and Art. As a California Public Charter School, it did not charge tuition and or have any admission requirements.

Students at the school were enrolled in one of three major areas of concentration: aviation maintenance technology; preparation for a career in business or international trade; or a personalized business internship program. The school opened in 2005.

Despite its unique program and offerings, during its first four years, the school struggled to maintain the needed student enrollment and performance results.

In 2011 the school's aviation science teacher was selected by NASA for the "Explorer Schools" program, to participate in summer research experiences and professional development opportunities "based on their demonstrated innovative use of project materials and an elevated and meaningful level of project participation." That year, he participated in research projects with the agency, launching weather balloons and performing microgravity experiments.

After a hearing with the Oakland City School Board in March 2011, the school's charter was not renewed, and the campus was shuttered in June 2011, graduating only two classes.
