= Fruitvale station =

Rapid transit station in San Francisco Bay Area

Fruitvale
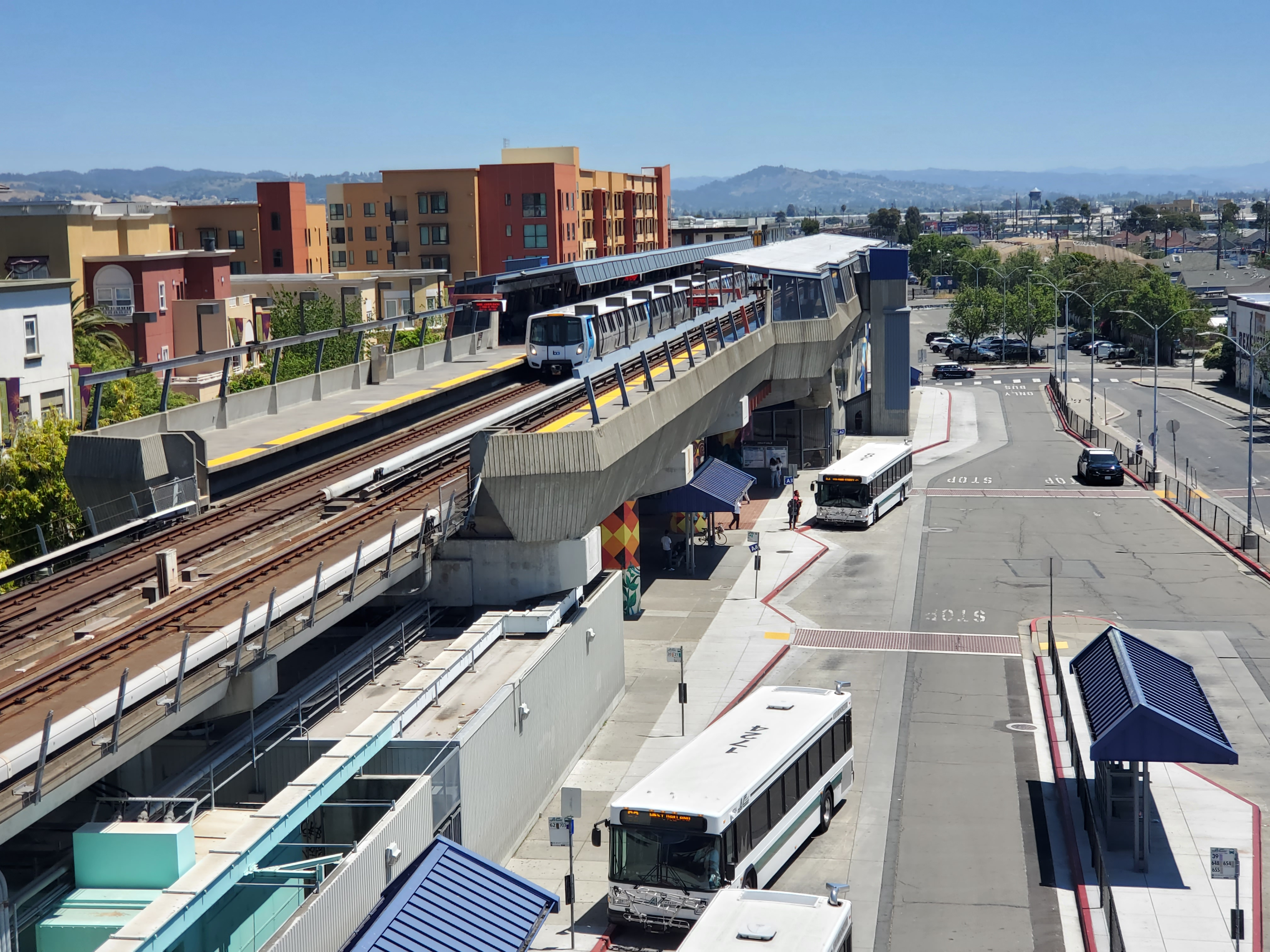
- Fruitvale station in May 2025

General information
- Location: 3401 East 12th Street; Oakland, California
- Coordinates: 37.7748°N 122.2241°W
- Line: BART A-Line
- Platforms: 2 side platforms
- Tracks: 2
- Connections: AC Transit: O, 1T, 14, 19, 30, 31, 51A, 54, 62, 706, 801, 851

Construction
- Structure type: Elevated
- Parking: 1,268 spaces
- Cycle facilities: Racks, station, 20 lockers
- Accessible: Yes
- Architect: Neil Smith; Reynolds & Chamberlain

Other information
- Station code: BART: FTVL

History
- Opened: September 11, 1972

Passengers
- 2025: 4,111 (weekday average)

Services
Preceding station	Bay Area Rapid Transit	Following station
Lake Merritt toward Daly City	Blue Line	Coliseum toward Dublin/Pleasanton
Lake Merritt toward Daly City	Green Line	Coliseum toward Berryessa
Lake Merritt toward Richmond	Orange Line	Coliseum toward Berryessa
Preceding station	AC Transit	Following station
31st Avenue toward Uptown Transit Center	Tempo Station on International Boulevard	39th Avenue toward San Leandro BART
Location

Fruitvale station is a Bay Area Rapid Transit (BART) station located in the Fruitvale District of Oakland, California, United States. The elevated station has two side platforms. The station is served by the Orange, Green, and Blue lines.

== History ==
By August 1965, the city of Oakland's preferred name for the station was "Fruitvale". BART approved the name that December. Service at the station began on September 11, 1972. Due to a national strike that year by elevator constructors, elevator construction on the early stations was delayed. Elevators at most of the initial stations, including Fruitvale, were completed in the months following the opening.

Planning for mixed-use transit oriented development (TOD) to replace the surface parking lots beginning in the late 1990s. The first phase included 47 residential units, 37,000 square feet (3,400 m^{2}) of retail, a charter high school, a health clinic, a preschool, a senior center, a public library, and a BART parking garage; it was completed in 2004. BART sold the remaining surface lot to the Oakland Redevelopment Agency in 2010. A 94-unit residential building opened in 2019, followed by a 181-unit building with 6,000 square feet (560 m^{2}) of retail space in 2024. The redevelopment of the station area to a mixed-use "transit village" has served as a model for similar planning elsewhere in the Bay Area. As of 2024, BART indicates "significant market, local support, and/or implementation barriers" that must be overcome to allow additional TOD on the Derby Avenue parking lot and the busway. Such development would not begin until at least the mid-2030s.

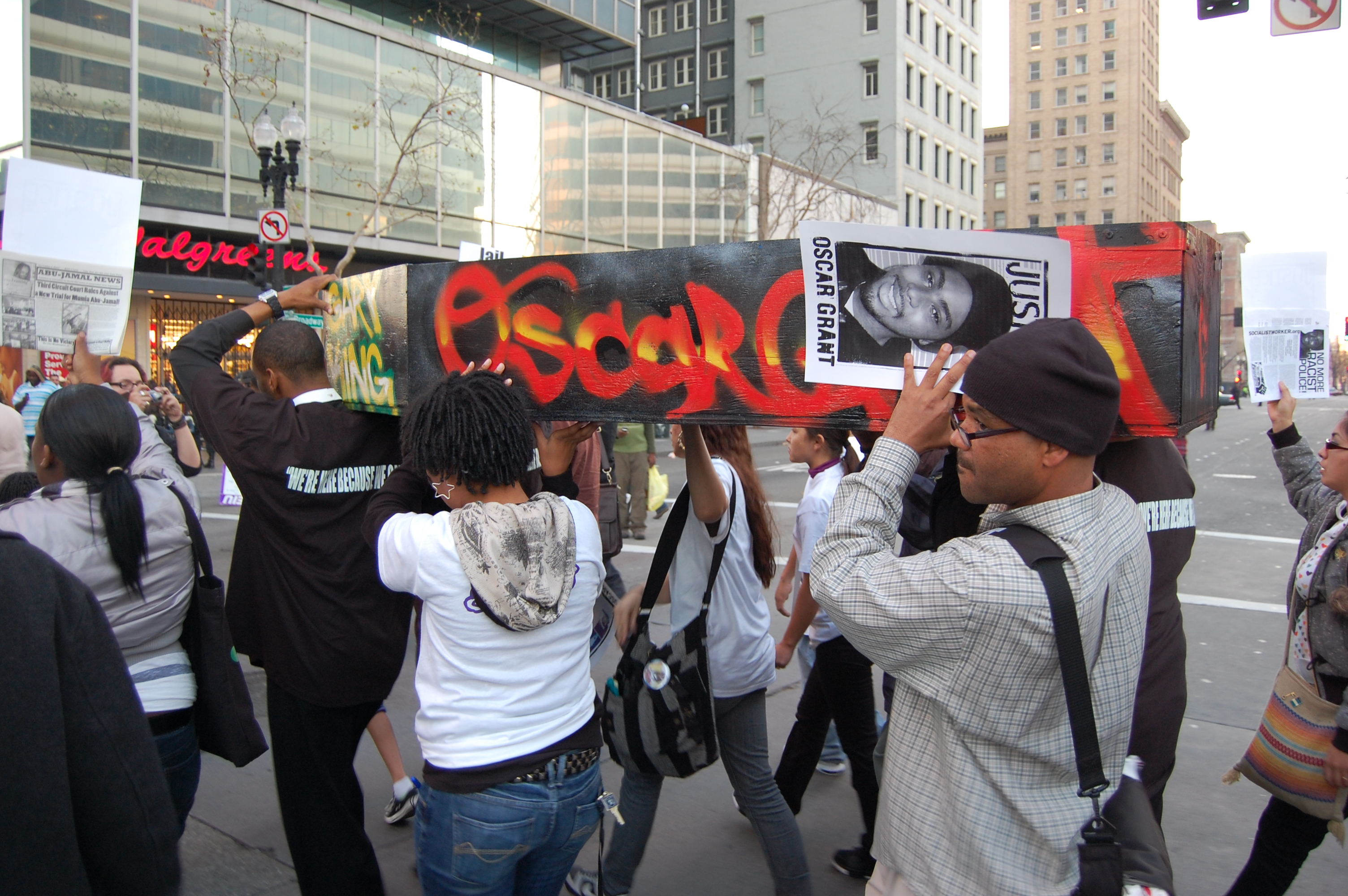
Protesters after the 2009 police shooting of Oscar Grant

On January 1, 2009, a BART police officer fatally shot an unarmed man, Oscar Grant III, at Fruitvale station while responding to reports of a fight on a train. Grant's death sparked several protests in Oakland, and was one of several police killings that contributed to the nationwide Black Lives Matter movement. Fruitvale Station, a film about the killing, was released in 2013.

Tempo bus rapid transit service on International Boulevard began on August 9, 2020. The line's Fruitvale station is located about 600 feet (180 m) northeast of the BART station. Installation of second-generation BART faregates at the station took place from August 13–21, 2024.
