= Direct evidence =

Evidence that supports an assertion directly, without intervening inference

In law, a body of facts that directly supports the truth of an assertion without intervening inference. It is often exemplified by eyewitness testimony, which consists of a witness's description of their reputed direct sensory experience of an alleged act without the presentation of additional facts. By contrast, circumstantial evidence can help prove via inference whether an assertion is true, such as forensics presented by an expert witness.

In a criminal case, an eyewitness provides direct evidence of the actus reus if they testify that they witnessed the actual performance of the criminal event under question. Other testimony, such as the witness description of a chase leading up to an act of violence or a so-called smoking gun is considered circumstantial.

== See also ==
- Digital evidence – Evidential information stored or transmitted in digital form
- Evidence – Material supporting an assertion
- Hearsay – Usually inadmissible description of out-of-court statements
- In flagrante delicto – The catching of a criminal "red-handed"
