= Lists of San Francisco Bay Area topics =

This is a list of lists of San Francisco Bay Area topics, lists related to the San Francisco Bay Area, California, and its various subregions, excluding lists specific to the city of San Francisco itself. For the San Francisco-related lists, see Lists of San Francisco topics.

== Buildings ==
- List of Berkeley Landmarks in Berkeley, California
- List of tallest buildings in Oakland, California
- List of tallest buildings in San Jose

== Culture ==
- List of bands from the San Francisco Bay Area
- List of San Francisco Bay Area festivals and fairs
- List of museums in the San Francisco Bay Area
- List of attractions in Silicon Valley
- List of San Francisco Bay Area writers

== Economy ==
- List of companies based in the San Francisco Bay Area
- List of acquisitions by Juniper Networks
- List of television stations in the San Francisco Bay Area

== Education ==
- List of Nobel laureates affiliated with the University of California, Berkeley
- List of University of California, Berkeley alumni
- List of University of California, Berkeley faculty
- List of Berkeley High School (Berkeley, California) people
- List of Mills College people
- List of Oakland California elementary schools
- List of Oakland, California high schools
- List of public Oakland California middle schools
- List of Pacific Union College alumni
- List of San Jose State University people
- Santa Rosa City Schools
- List of school districts in Sonoma County, California
- List of Stanford University residence halls

== Environment ==
- List of Sonoma County Regional Parks facilities
- List of parks in Oakland, California
- List of beaches in Sonoma County, California
- List of lakes in the San Francisco Bay Area
- List of summits of the San Francisco Bay Area
- List of watercourses in the San Francisco Bay Area
- List of San Francisco Bay Area wildflowers

== Geography ==
- List of cities and towns in the San Francisco Bay Area
- List of Berkeley neighborhoods
- List of neighborhoods in Oakland, California
- List of streets in San Jose, California

== Government ==
- List of mayors of Cotati, California
- List of mayors of Oakland, California
- List of city managers of San Jose, California
- List of mayors of San Jose, California

== History ==
- Timeline of the San Francisco Bay Area
- List of inmates of Alcatraz
- List of ships built in Alameda, California
- List of people associated with the California Gold Rush
- List of Ohlone villages

== National Register of Historic Places ==
- National Register of Historic Places listings in Alameda County, California
- National Register of Historic Places listings in Contra Costa County, California
- National Register of Historic Places listings in Marin County, California
- National Register of Historic Places listings in Mendocino County, California
- National Register of Historic Places listings in Napa County, California
- National Register of Historic Places listings in San Mateo County, California
- National Register of Historic Places listings in Santa Clara County, California
- National Register of Historic Places listings in Solano County, California
- National Register of Historic Places listings in Sonoma County, California

== People (by region) ==
- List of people from Hayward, California
- List of people from Marin County, California
- List of people from Oakland, California
- List of people from San Jose, California

== Sports ==
- List of Oakland Athletics Opening Day starting pitchers
- List of Oakland Athletics team records
- List of milestone home runs by Barry Bonds
- List of California Golden Seals head coaches
- List of California Golden Seals players
- List of Golden State Warriors head coaches
- List of baseball parks in Oakland, California
- List of Oakland Raiders head coaches
- List of San Jose Sharks players

== Transportation ==
- List of airports in the San Francisco Bay Area
- List of Bay Area Rapid Transit stations
- List of Caltrain stations
- List of Golden Gate Transit routes
- List of Muni Metro stations
- List of VTA light rail stations
- List of San Francisco Bay Area trains
- Transportation in the San Francisco Bay Area
- List of Santa Clara VTA bus routes

== See also ==
- Lists of San Francisco topics
- Outline of California
