= CIF Oakland Section =

High school athletic organization in California

- Type: NPO
- Legal status: Association
- Purpose: Athletic
- Headquarters: Oakland, California
- Location: 900 High St.
- Region served: Oakland, California
- Members: 20 schools
- Commissioner: Franky Navarro
- Affiliations: California Interscholastic Federation
- Website: cifoakland.org

The Oakland Section (OS) is the governing body of high school sports for school for the Oakland Unified School District. It is one of ten sections that comprise the California Interscholastic Federation (CIF). The OS has further divided the Bay Area Charter School Athletic Conference (BACSAC) and Oakland Athletic League (OAL).

== History ==
The California Interscholastic League has suggested that OS merged with the CIF North Coast Section, as the OS is one of the smallest sections in the CIF.

In 2010–11 school year, charter schools in Oakland formed the Bay Area Charter School Athletic Conference and joined the Oakland Section.

== Members ==
=== OAL ===
- Castlemont High School
- Coliseum College Prep Academy
- Fremont High School
- Life Academy of Health and Bioscience
- Madison Park Academy
- McClymonds High School
- Oakland High School
- Oakland International High School
- Oakland Technical High School
- Skyline High School

=== BACSAC ===
- American Indian Public High School(AIMS)
- ARISE High School
- Bay Area Technology School
- Aspire California College Preparatory Academy
- Envision Academy of Arts & Technology
- FAME Public Charter School
- Aspire Golden State College Preparatory Academy
- Impact Academy of Arts & Technology
- KIPP King Collegiate High School
- Leadership Public School - Hayward
- Lighthouse Community Charter School
- Aspire Lionel Wilson Preparatory Academy
- Oakland Charter High School
- Oakland Unity High School
