= List of San Francisco Giants first-round draft picks =

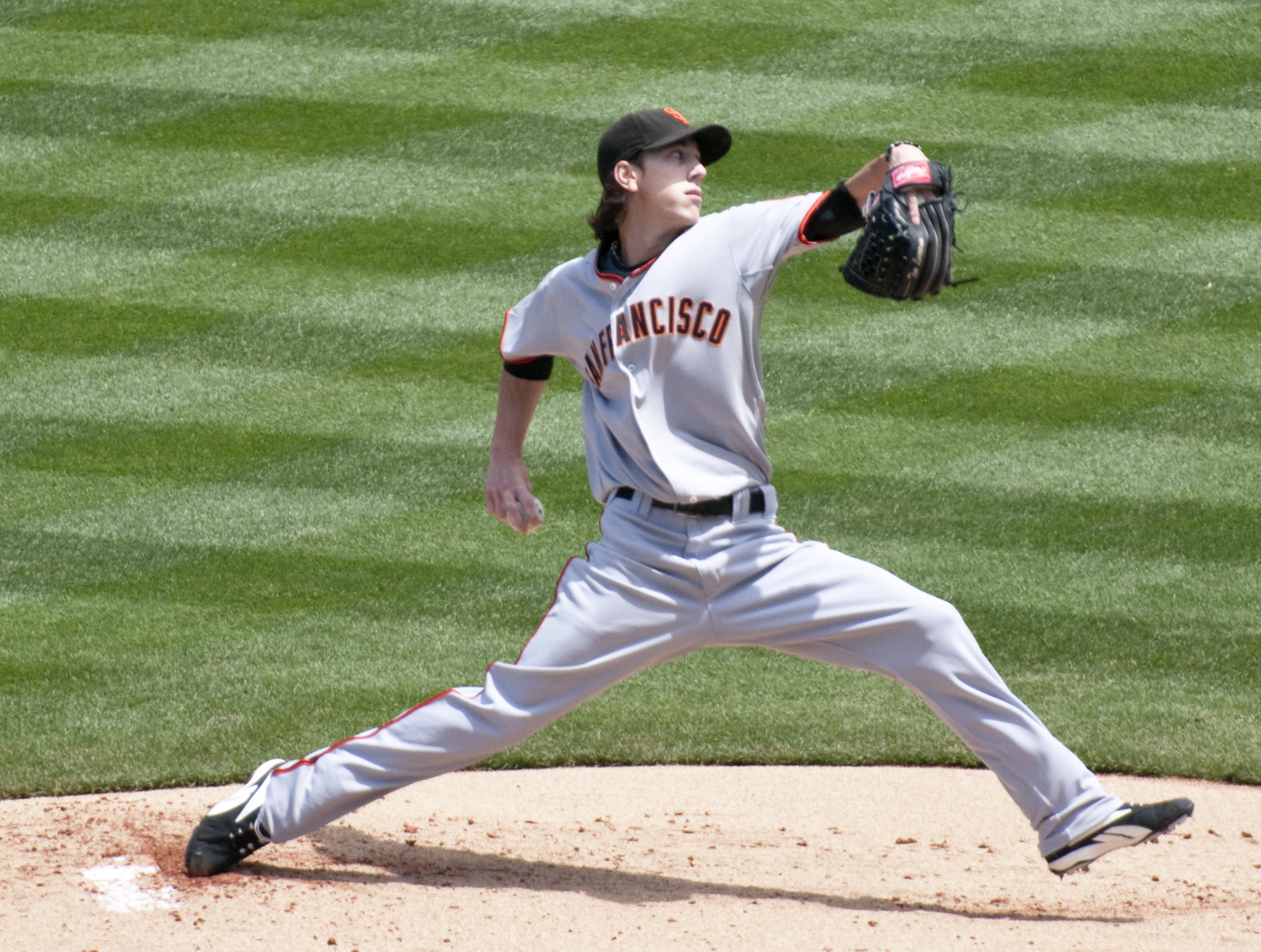
Tim Lincecum (2006) won two Cy Young Awards with the Giants.

The San Francisco Giants are a Major League Baseball (MLB) franchise based in San Francisco, California. They play in the National League West division. Officially known as the "First-Year Player Draft", the Rule 4 Draft is MLB's primary mechanism for assigning players from high schools, colleges, and other amateur clubs to its franchises. The draft order is determined based on the previous season's standings, with the team possessing the worst record receiving the first pick. In addition, teams which lost free agents in the previous off-season may be awarded compensatory or supplementary picks. Since the establishment of the draft in 1965, the Giants have selected 70 players in the first round.

Of those 70 players, 32 have been pitchers, the most of any position; 23 of these were right-handed, while 9 were left-handed. The Giants have also selected thirteen outfielders, seven shortstops, seven catchers, four third basemen, and three players each at first and second base. One player, 2010 selection Gary Brown, was drafted as a center fielder. The franchise has drafted eight players from colleges or high schools in their home state of California, more than any other. The Giants have never held the first-overall pick, but they did have the second pick twice: in 1985, with which they drafted Will Clark, and in 2018, used to select Joey Bart.

Four of San Francisco's first-round draft picks have won three World Series championships with the team—Matt Cain, Tim Lincecum, Madison Bumgarner, and Buster Posey—all as part of the 2010, 2012 and 2014 championship teams. Two of the Giants' selections have won the National League Rookie of the Year Award: Gary Matthews (drafted in 1968) won in 1973; and Posey (drafted in 2008) won the award in 2010. Posey was also named the National League's Most Valuable Player in 2012. Three of the Giants selections have been named the Most Valuable Player of the National League Championship Series; Matthews in 1983 with Philadelphia, Clark in 1989 and Bumgarner in 2014. Bumgarner was also named Most Valuable Player of the 2014 World Series. Lincecum, the Giants' 2006 selection, won the Cy Young Award—awarded annually to the best pitcher in each league—in 2008 and 2009.

San Francisco has made 16 selections in the supplemental round of the draft. They have also received 12 compensatory picks since the first draft in 1965. These additional picks are provided when a team loses a particularly valuable free agent in the previous off-season,^{[V]} or, more recently, if a team fails to sign a draft pick from the previous year. The Giants have failed to sign two of their first-round selections: 1979 pick Rick Luecken; and 1996 pick Matt White. The Giants did not receive any compensation for Luecken, but they did receive the 49th pick in 1997 for failing to sign White.

== Key ==
Year	Links to an article about that year's Major League Baseball draft
Position	Indicates the secondary/collegiate position at which the player was drafted, rather than the professional position the player went on to play
Pick	Indicates the number of the pick
*	Player did not sign with the Giants
§	Indicates a supplemental pick
'10	Player was a member of the Giants' 2010 championship team
'12	Player was a member of the Giants' 2012 championship team
'14	Player was a member of the Giants' 2014 championship team

== Picks ==
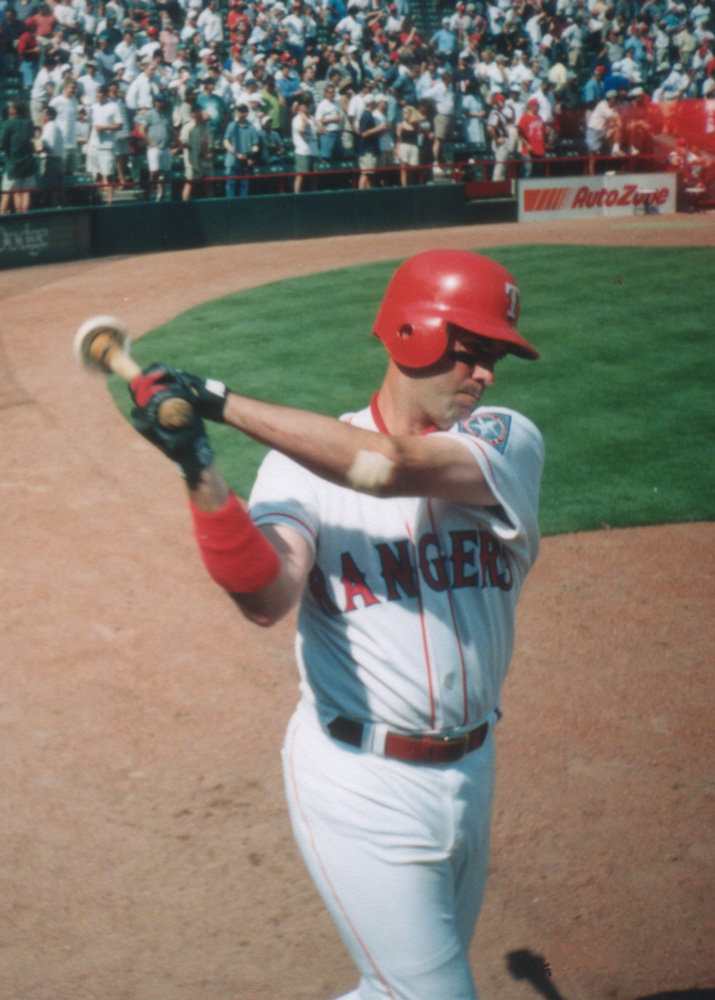
Will Clark (1985) won a silver medal when baseball was a demonstration sport in the 1984 Los Angeles Olympics.

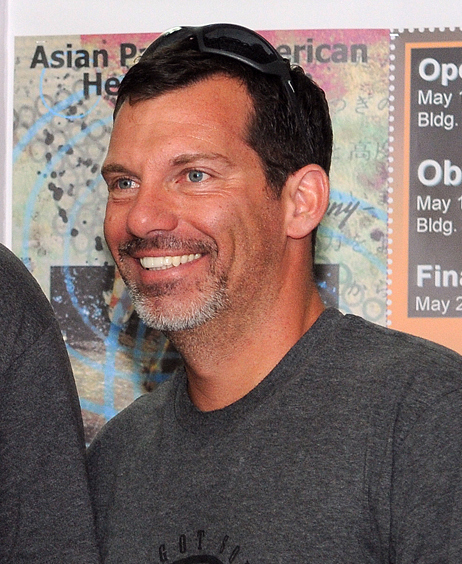
Mike Remlinger (1987) was named to the 2002 All-Star Team.

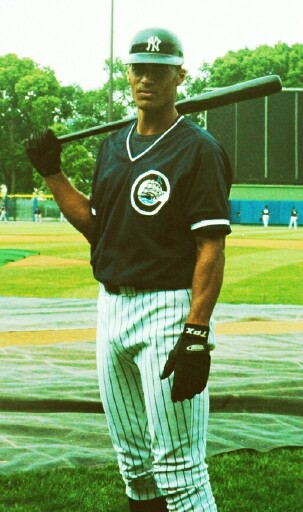
Marcus Jensen (1990) won a gold medal with the United States team at the 2000 Sydney Olympics.

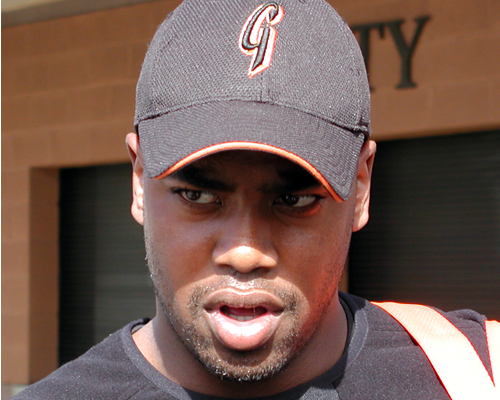
Jerome Williams (1999) is the Giants' only first-round selection to come from Hawaii.

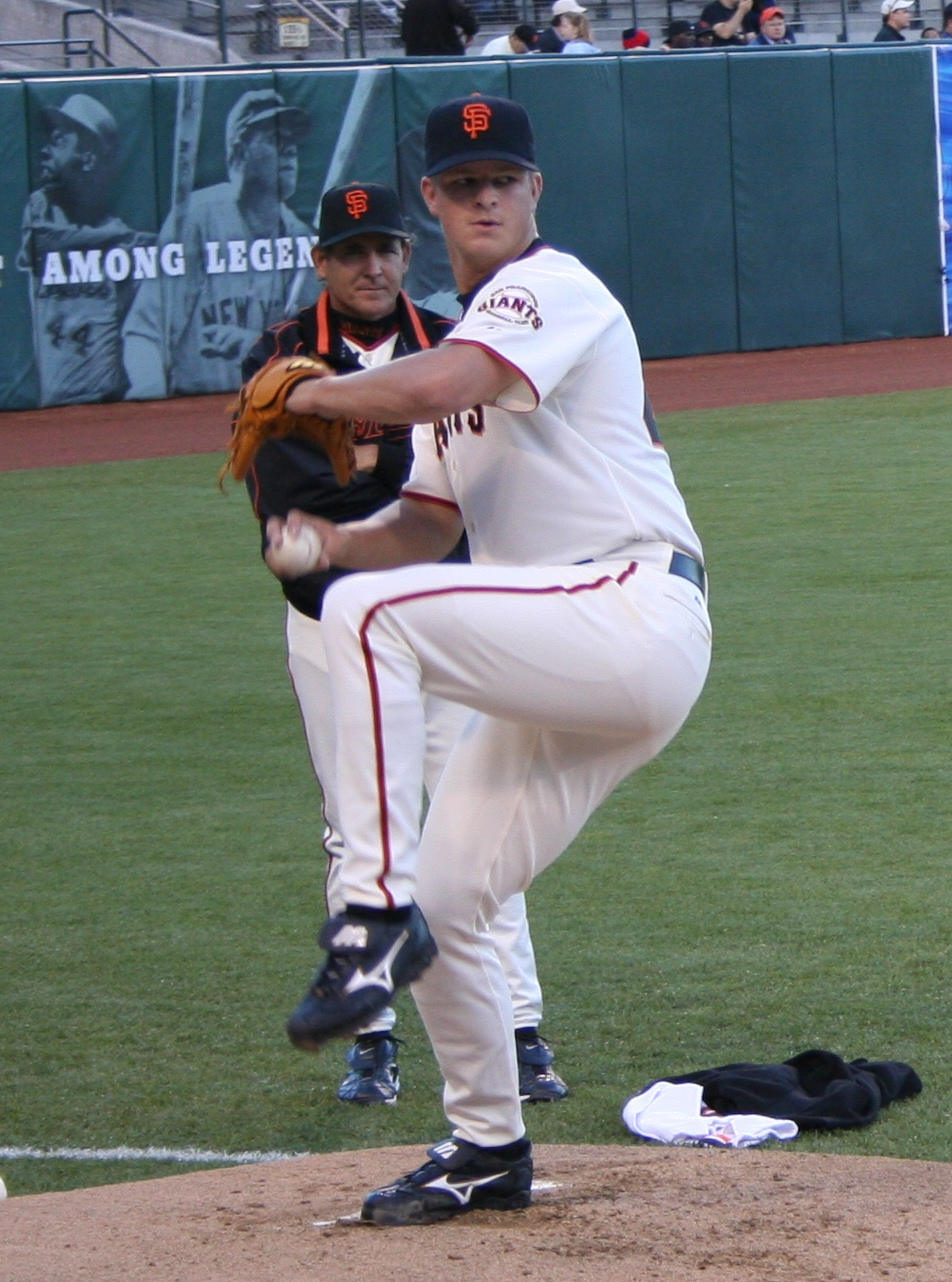
Matt Cain (2002) was awarded the Willie Mac Award in 2009.

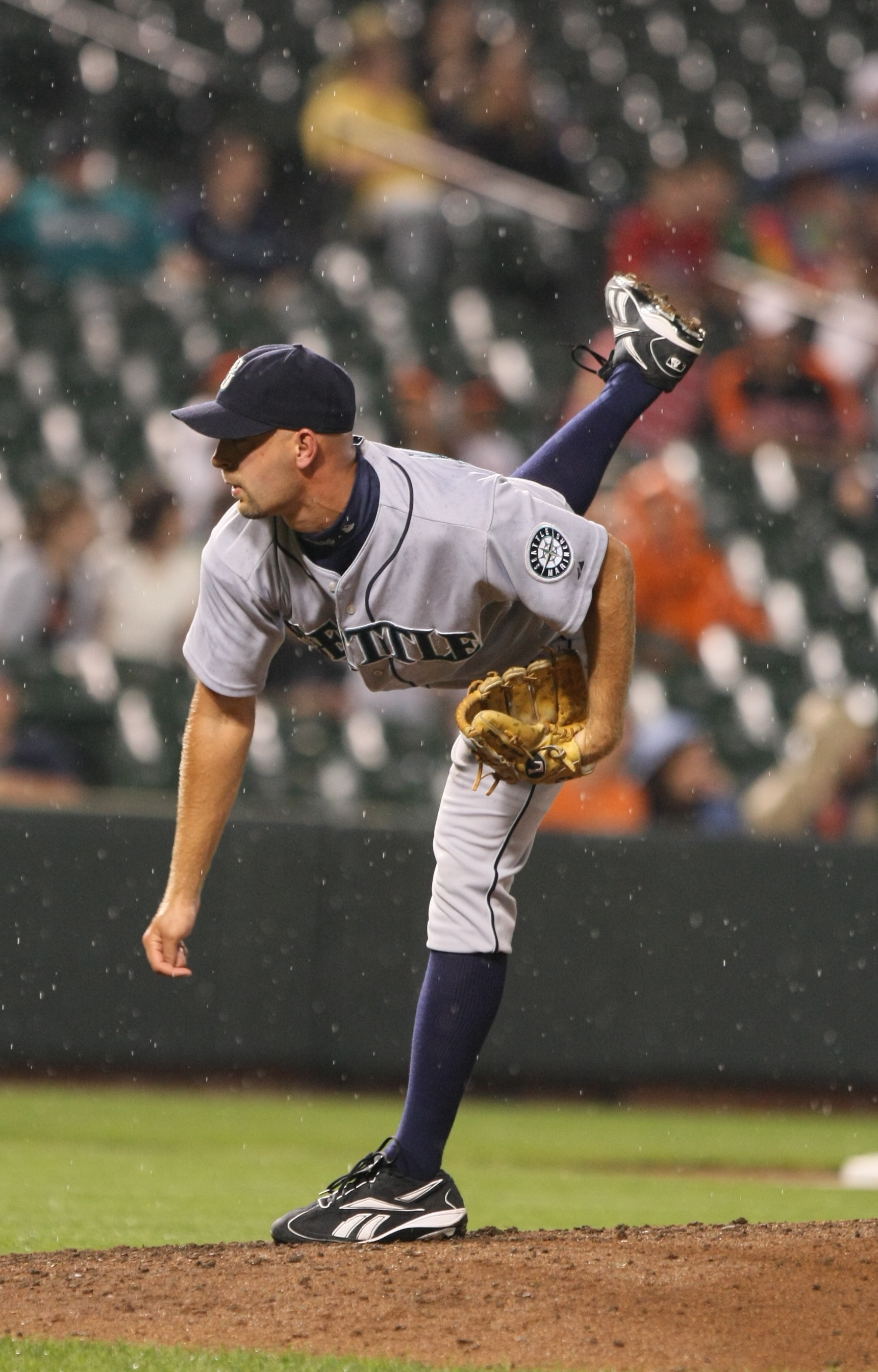
In alphabetical order, David Aardsma (2003) comes before any player in MLB history.

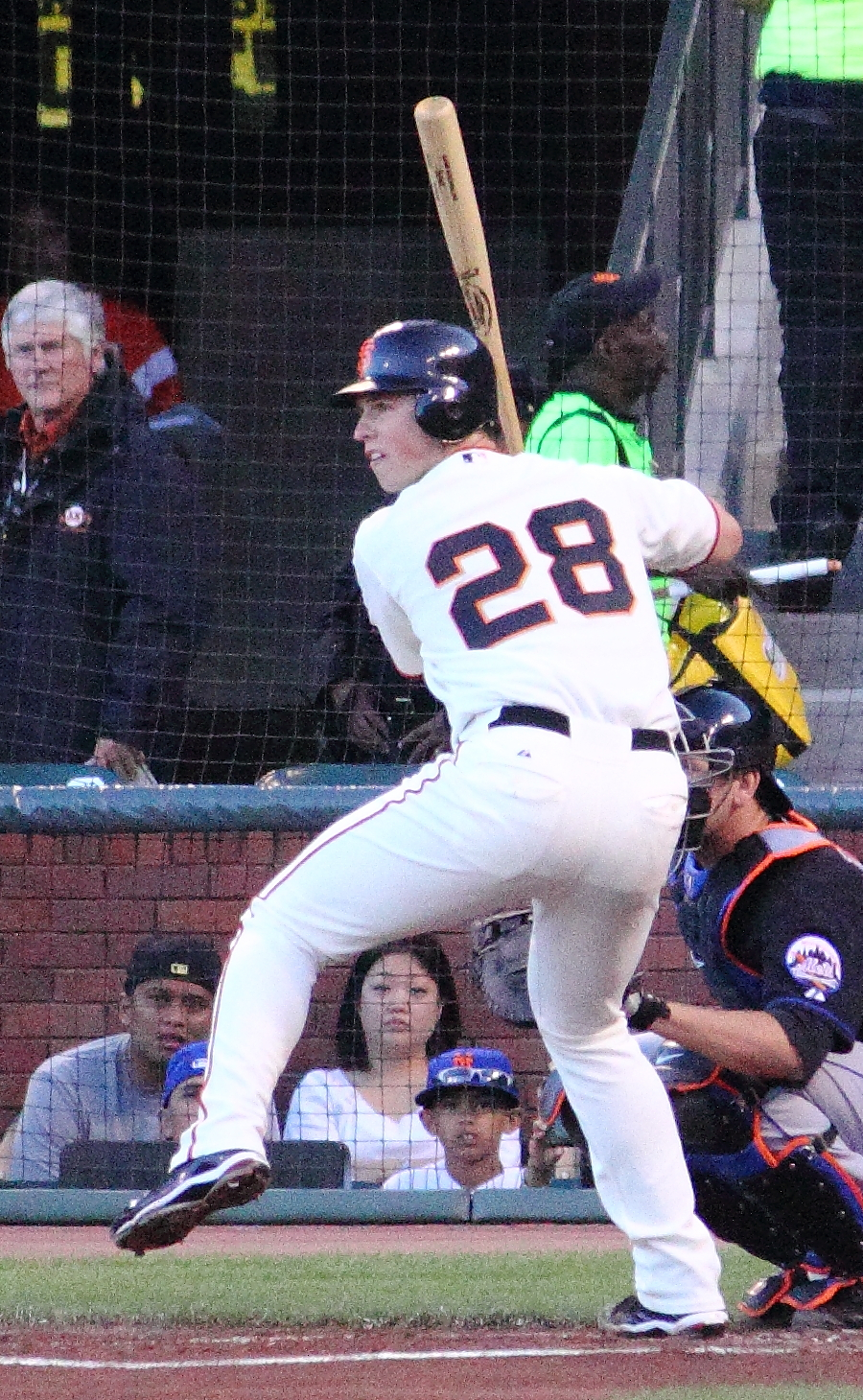
Buster Posey (2008) won the 2010 National League Rookie of the Year Award and 2012 National League Most Valuable Player Award.

Year	Name	Position	School location	Pick	Ref
1965	Al Gallagher	Third baseman	Santa Clara University (Santa Clara, California)	14	
1966	Bob Reynolds	Right-handed pitcher	Ingraham High School (Seattle)	17	
1967	Dave Rader	Catcher	South High School (Bakersfield, California)	18	
1968	Gary Matthews	Outfielder	San Fernando High School (San Fernando, California)	17	
1969	Mike Phillips	Shortstop	MacArthur High School (Irving, Texas)	18	
1970	John D'Acquisto	Right-handed pitcher	St. Augustine High School (San Diego)	17	
1971	Frank Riccelli	Left-handed pitcher	Christian Brothers Academy (Syracuse, New York)	18	
1972	Rob Dressler	Right-handed pitcher	Madison High School (Portland, Oregon)	19	
1973	Johnnie LeMaster	Shortstop	Paintsville High School (Paintsville, Kentucky)	6	
1974	Terry Lee	Second baseman	San Luis Obispo High School (San Luis Obispo, California)	19	
1975	Ted Barnicle	Left-handed pitcher	Jacksonville State University (Jacksonville, Alabama)	8	
1976	Mark Kuecker	Shortstop	Brenham High School (Brenham, Texas)	11	
1977	Craig Landis	Shortstop	Vintage High School (Napa, California)	10	
1978	Bob Cummings	Catcher	Brother Rice High School (Chicago)	7	
1979	Scott Garrelts	Right-handed pitcher	Paxton-Buckley-Loda High School (Buckley, Illinois)	15^{[a]}	
1979	Rick Luecken*	Right-handed pitcher	Spring Woods High School (Houston, Texas)	18	
1980	Jessie Reid	First baseman	Lynwood High School (Lynwood, California)	7	
1981	Mark Grant	Right-handed pitcher	Joliet Catholic High School (Joliet, Illinois)	10	
1982	Steve Stanicek	First baseman	University of Nebraska–Lincoln (Lincoln, Nebraska)	11	
1983	no first-round pick^{[b]}				
1984	Alan Cockrell	Outfielder	University of Tennessee (Knoxville, Tennessee)	9	
1984	Terry Mulholland	Left-handed pitcher	Marietta College (Marietta, Ohio)	24^{[c]}	
1985	Will Clark	First baseman	Mississippi State University (Starkville, Mississippi)	2	
1986	Matt Williams	Third baseman	University of Nevada, Las Vegas (Paradise, Nevada)	3	
1987	Mike Remlinger	Left-handed pitcher	Dartmouth College (Hanover, New Hampshire)	16	
1988	Royce Clayton	Shortstop	St. Bernard High School (Los Angeles)	15^{[d]}	
1988	Ted Wood	Outfielder	University of New Orleans (New Orleans)	29§^{[e]}	
1989	Steve Hosey	Outfielder	California State University, Fresno (Fresno, California)	14	
1990	Adam Hyzdu	Outfielder	Moeller High School (Cincinnati)	15^{[f]}	
1990	Eric Christopherson	Catcher	San Diego State University (San Diego)	19^{[g]}	
1990	Marcus Jensen	Catcher	Skyline High School (Oakland, California)	33§^{[g]}	
1991	Steve Whitaker	Left-handed pitcher	California State University, Long Beach (Long Beach, California)	33§^{[h]}	
1992	Calvin Murray	Outfielder	University of Texas at Austin (Austin, Texas)	7	
1993	Steve Soderstrom	Right-handed pitcher	California State University, Fresno (Fresno, California)	6	
1994	Dante Powell	Outfielder	California State University, Fullerton (Fullerton, California)	22^{[i]}	
1994	Jacob Cruz	Outfielder	Arizona State University (Tempe, Arizona)	32§^{[i]}	
1995	Joe Fontenot	Right-handed pitcher	Acadiana High School (Lafayette, Louisiana)	16	
1996	Matt White*	Right-handed pitcher	Waynesboro Area High School (Waynesboro, Pennsylvania)	7	
1997	Jason Grilli	Right-handed pitcher	Seton Hall University (South Orange, New Jersey)	4	
1997	Dan McKinley	Outfielder	Arizona State University (Tempe, Arizona)	49§^{[j]}	
1998	Tony Torcato	Third baseman	Woodland High School (Woodland, California)	19^{[k]}	
1998	Nate Bump	Right-handed pitcher	Pennsylvania State University (State College, Pennsylvania)	25	
1998	Arturo McDowell	Outfielder	Forest Hill Community High School (West Palm Beach, Florida)	29^{[l]}	
1998	Chris Jones	Left-handed pitcher	South Mecklenburg High School (Charlotte, North Carolina)	38§^{[l]}	
1998	Jeff Urban	Left-handed pitcher	Ball State University (Muncie, Indiana)	41§^{[m]}	
1999	Kurt Ainsworth	Right-handed pitcher	Louisiana State University (Baton Rouge, Louisiana)	24	
1999	Jerome Williams	Right-handed pitcher	Waipahu High School (Waipahu, Hawaii)	39§^{[n]}	
2000	Boof Bonser	Right-handed pitcher	Gibbs High School (St. Petersburg, Florida)	21	
2001	Brad Hennessey	Right-handed pitcher	Youngstown State University (Youngstown, Ohio)	21^{[o]}	
2001	Noah Lowry	Left-handed pitcher	Pepperdine University (Malibu, California)	30	
2001	Todd Linden	Outfielder	Louisiana State University (Baton Rouge, Louisiana)	41§^{[o]}	
2002	Matt Cain '10 '12 '14	Right-handed pitcher	Houston High School (Germantown, Tennessee)	25	
2003	David Aardsma	Right-handed pitcher	Rice University (Houston)	22^{[p]}	
2003	Craig Whitaker	Right-handed pitcher	Lufkin High School (Lufkin, Texas)	34§^{[p]}	
2004	no first-round pick^{[q]}				
2005	no first-round pick^{[r]}				
2006	Tim Lincecum '10 '12 '14	Right-handed pitcher	University of Washington (Seattle)	10	
2006	Emmanuel Burriss	Shortstop	Kent State University (Kent, Ohio)	33§^{[s]}	
2007	Madison Bumgarner '10 '12 '14	Left-handed pitcher	South Caldwell High School (Hudson, North Carolina)	10	
2007	Tim Alderson	Right-handed pitcher	Horizon High School (Scottsdale, Arizona)	22^{[t]}	
2007	Wendell Fairley	Outfielder	George County High School (Lucedale, Mississippi)	29^{[u]}	
2007	Nick Noonan	Second baseman	Francis W. Parker School (San Diego, California)	32§^{[u]}	
2007	Jackson Williams	Catcher	University of Oklahoma (Norman, Oklahoma)	43§^{[t]}	
2007	Charlie Culberson	Second baseman	Calhoun High School (Calhoun, Georgia)	51§^{[v]}	
2008	Buster Posey '10 '12 '14	Catcher	Florida State University (Tallahassee, Florida)	5	
2008	Conor Gillaspie	Third baseman	Wichita State University (Wichita, Kansas)	37§^{[w]}	
2009	Zack Wheeler	Right-handed pitcher	East Paulding High School (Dallas, Georgia)	6	
2010	Gary Brown	Center fielder	California State University, Fullerton (Fullerton, California)	24	
2011	Joe Panik '14	Shortstop	St. John's University (New York City)	29	
2011	Kyle Crick	Right-handed pitcher	Sherman High School (Sherman, Texas)	49§^{[x]}	
2012	Chris Stratton	Right-handed pitcher	Mississippi State University (Starkville, Mississippi)	20	
2013	Christian Arroyo	Shortstop	Hernando High School (Florida) (Brooksville, Florida)	25	
2014	Tyler Beede	Right-handed pitcher	Vanderbilt University (Nashville, Tennessee)	14	
2015	Phil Bickford	Right-handed pitcher	College of Southern Nevada (Henderson, Nevada)	18	
2015	Chris Shaw	First baseman	Boston College (Chestnut Hill, Massachusetts)	31	
2016	no first-round pick^{[b]}				
2017	Heliot Ramos	Outfielder	Leadership Christian Academy (Puerto Rico)	19^{[g]}	
2018	Joey Bart	Catcher	Georgia Tech (Buford, Georgia)	2	
2019	Hunter Bishop	Outfielder	Arizona State University (Tempe, Arizona)	10	
2020	Patrick Bailey	Catcher	North Carolina State University (Raleigh, North Carolina)	13	
2021	Will Bednar	Right-handed pitcher	Mississippi State (Starkville, Mississippi)	14	
2022	Reggie Crawford	Left-handed Pitcher and First baseman	University of Connecticut (Storrs, Connecticut)	30	
2023	Bryce Eldridge	First baseman	James Madison High School (Vienna, Virginia)	16	
2024	James Tibbs III	Outfielder	Florida State University (Tallahassee, Florida)	13	
2025	Gavin Kilen	Shortstop	University of Tennessee (Knoxville, Tennessee)	13	
2026	Jackson Flora	Right-handed pitcher	University of California, Santa Barbara (Santa Barbara, California)	4	
2026	Carson Bolemon	Left-handed pitcher	Southside Christian School (Simpsonville, South Carolina)	29§	

== Footnotes ==
- ^{V} Free agents are evaluated by the Elias Sports Bureau and rated "Type A", "Type B", or not compensation-eligible. If a team offers arbitration to a player but that player refuses and subsequently signs with another team, the original team may receive additional draft picks. If a "Type A" free agent leaves in this way his previous team receives a supplemental pick and a compensation pick from the team with which he signs. If a "Type B" free agent leaves in this way his previous team receives only a supplemental pick.
- ^{a} The Giants gained a compensatory first-round pick in 1979 from the California Angels for losing free agent Jim Barr.
- ^{b} The Giants lost their first-round pick in 1983 to the Montreal Expos as compensation for signing free agent Joel Youngblood.
- ^{c} The Giants gained a compensatory first-round pick in 1984 from the Detroit Tigers for losing free agent Darrell Evans.
- ^{d} The Giants gained a compensatory first-round pick in 1988 from the Cincinnati Reds for losing free agent Eddie Milner. They lost their original first-round pick to the Cleveland Indians as compensation for signing free agent Brett Butler.
- ^{e} The Giants gained a supplemental first-round pick in 1988 for losing free agent Chili Davis.
- ^{f} The Giants gained a compensatory first-round pick in 1990 for losing free agent Ken Oberkfell to the Houston Astros. They lost their original first-round pick to the Astros as compensation for signing free agent Kevin Bass.
- ^{g} The Giants gained a compensatory and a supplemental first-round pick in 1990 for losing free agent Craig Lefferts to the San Diego Padres.
- ^{h} The Giants gained a supplemental first-round pick in 1991 for losing free agent Brett Butler. They lost their original first-round pick to the Toronto Blue Jays as compensation for signing free agent Bud Black.
- ^{i} The Giants gained a compensatory and a supplemental first-round pick in 1994 for losing free agent Will Clark to the Texas Rangers. They lost their original first-round pick to the Houston Astros as compensation for signing free agent Mark Portugal.
- ^{j} The Giants gained a supplemental first-round pick in 1997 for failing to sign 1996 first-round pick Matt White.
- ^{k} The Giants gained a compensatory first-round pick in 1998 from the Houston Astros for losing free agent Doug Henry.
- ^{l} The Giants gained a compensatory and a supplemental first-round pick in 1998 for losing free agent Roberto Hernández to the Tampa Bay Devil Rays.
- ^{m} The Giants gained a supplemental first-round pick in 1998 for losing free agent Wilson Álvarez.
- ^{n} The Giants gained a supplemental first-round pick in 1999 for losing free agent José Mesa.
- ^{o} The Giants gained a compensatory and a supplemental first-round pick in 2001 for losing free agent Ellis Burks to the Cleveland Indians.
- ^{p} The Giants gained a compensatory and a supplemental first-round pick in 2003 for losing free agent Jeff Kent to the Houston Astros. They lost their original first-round pick to the Oakland Athletics as compensation for signing free agent Ray Durham.
- ^{q} The Giants lost their first-round pick in 2004 to the Kansas City Royals as compensation for signing free agent Michael Tucker.
- ^{r} The Giants lost their first-round pick in 2005 to the Florida Marlins as compensation for signing free agent Armando Benítez.
- ^{s} The Giants gained a supplemental first-round pick in 2006 for losing free agent Scott Eyre.
- ^{t} The Giants gained a compensatory and a supplemental first-round pick in 2007 for losing free agent Jason Schmidt to the Los Angeles Dodgers.
- ^{u} The Giants gained a compensatory and a supplemental first-round pick in 2007 for losing free agent Moisés Alou to the New York Mets.
- ^{v} The Giants gained a supplemental first-round pick in 2007 for losing free agent Mike Stanton.
- ^{w} The Giants gained a supplemental first-round pick in 2008 for losing free agent Pedro Feliz.
- ^{x} The Giants gained a supplemental first-round pick in 2011 for losing free agent Juan Uribe.
