= Lists of San Francisco topics =

This is a comprehensive list of lists related to San Francisco. San Francisco is a city in California, within the San Francisco Bay Area.

== Natural features ==
- List of hills in San Francisco, California
- List of parks in San Francisco

== Buildings and man-made features ==
- List of streets and alleys in Chinatown, San Francisco
- List of streets in San Francisco
- List of tallest buildings in San Francisco
- List of San Francisco Designated Landmarks
- National Register of Historic Places listings in San Francisco, California

== Government ==
- List of mayors of San Francisco, California
- List of pre-statehood mayors of San Francisco

== Colleges and universities ==
- List of colleges and universities in San Francisco
- List of San Francisco State University people
- List of University of San Francisco people

== Sports ==
- List of baseball parks in San Francisco, California
- List of San Francisco 49ers broadcasters
- List of San Francisco 49ers first-round draft picks
- List of San Francisco 49ers head coaches
- List of San Francisco 49ers seasons
- List of San Francisco 49ers starting quarterbacks
- List of San Francisco Giants broadcasters
- List of San Francisco Giants managers
- List of San Francisco Giants Opening Day starting pitchers
- List of San Francisco Giants seasons

== Other ==
- List of companies headquartered in San Francisco
- List of defunct San Francisco Municipal Railway lines
- List of events in the history of the San Francisco Police Department
- List of people associated with San Francisco
- List of San Francisco Ballet at 75 productions
- List of San Francisco Municipal Railway lines
- List of theatres in San Francisco
- List of diplomatic missions in San Francisco
- List of San Francisco Giants first-round draft picks
- List of Golden Gate University people
- Neighborhoods in San Francisco
- Etymologies of place names in San Francisco
- San Francisco Board of Supervisors elections, 2006
- San Francisco Board of Supervisors elections, 2008
- San Francisco Board of Supervisors elections, 2010
- San Francisco County Jails
- San Francisco County Parishes

== See also ==
- Lists of San Francisco Bay Area topics
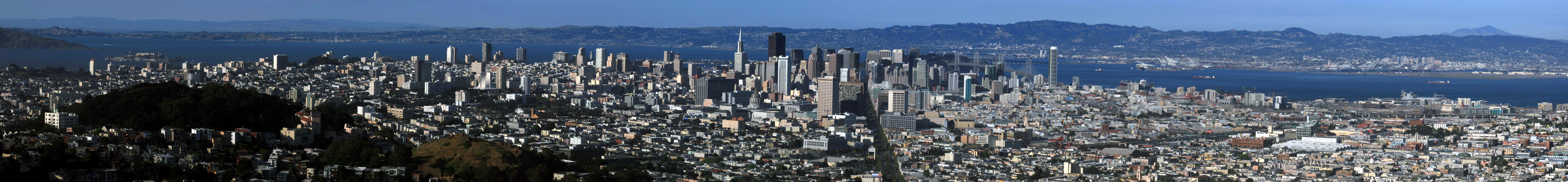
San Francisco panorama from Twin Peaks
