= List of Oakland, California high schools =

High schools in Oakland, California

This is a list of high schools in Oakland, California.

- American Indian Public High School, a charter school
- Aspire Lionel Wilson College Preparatory Academy, a charter school
- Aspire Golden State College Preparatory Academy, a (6-12) charter school
- Bishop O'Dowd High School
- Bunche High School (alternate continuation)
- Castlemont High School/Castlemont Community of Small Schools
- Coliseum College Prep Academy (6–12)
- The College Preparatory School
- Dewey Academy High School (alternate continuation)
- Envision Academy of Arts & Technology (8-12) charter school
- Far West High School
- Fremont High School
- Head Royce School
- Holy Names High School
- Lighthouse Community Public School
- Life Academy of Health and Bioscience
- Madison Park Academy 6-12
- McClymonds High School
- MetWest High School
- Oakland Charter High School
- Oakland Technical High School
  - Oakland Technical High Engineering Academy
- Oakland High School
- Oakland International High School
- Oakland School for the Arts
- Patten Academy
- Rudsdale High School (alternate continuation)
- Skyline High School
- Street Academy (alternate)

== Former schools ==
- Merritt Middle College High School (alternative education/middle college), closed in 2007
- Oakland Aviation High School, a charter school, opened in 2005, closed in 2011
- Roosevelt High School, opened in 1924, closed in 1934, now Roosevelt Middle School
- University High School, opened in 1923, closed in 1948, became a temporary school again in the 1970s
- University Preparatory Charter Academy, a charter school, opened in 2001, closed in 2007
- Youth Empowerment School (YES), a small public school that emerged from Fremont in 2004 and moved to the old King Estates Middle School campus after it was closed in 2011

== See also ==
- List of Oakland, California elementary schools
- List of Oakland, California middle schools
