= OAL =

OAL may refer to:

== Transport ==
- Cacoal Airport, Brazil
- Oatley railway station, Sydney, Australia
- Olympic Air, a Greek regional airline
- Olympic Airlines, defunct, the former flag carrier of Greece

== Other uses ==
- California Office of Administrative Law, in the United States
- Open Audio License
- Der Ostasiatische Lloyd, a German language newspaper published in Shanghai, China
- Overall length, particularly of an ammunition cartridge
- Oakland Athletic League, a subdivision of CIF Oakland Section
