= 1996 Major League Baseball draft =

Baseball draft of amateur players

General information
- Date(s): June 4–5, 1996

Overview
- First selection: Kris Benson; Pittsburgh Pirates

The 1996 Major League Baseball draft was an annual choosing of high school and college baseball players that was held on June 4 and 5, 1996. A total of 1740 players were drafted over the course of 100 rounds.

This is the only draft to last 100 rounds. The last player taken was outfielder Aron Amundson, drafted by the New York Yankees in the 100th round.

This draft is also notable because a record four first-round draft picks were not offered contracts by the teams that drafted them and subsequently became free agents. Under Major League Baseball's Collective Bargaining Agreement, the teams had been required to offer a written contract within fifteen days of the draft, but that rule had been ignored for decades prior to this draft. Agent Scott Boras challenged the White Sox on their lack of an offered contract for Bobby Seay and filed grievances on behalf of John Patterson and Matt White. Travis Lee's advisers followed suit.

== First round selections ==
= All-Star

Pick	Player	Team	Position	School
1	Kris Benson	Pittsburgh Pirates	P	Clemson
2	Travis Lee	Minnesota Twins	1B	San Diego State
3	Braden Looper	St. Louis Cardinals	P	Wichita State
4	Billy Koch	Toronto Blue Jays	P	Clemson
5	John Patterson	Montreal Expos	P	West Orange Stark HS (TX)
6	Seth Greisinger	Detroit Tigers	P	Virginia
7	Matt White	San Francisco Giants	P	Waynesboro Area HS (PA)
8	Chad Green	Milwaukee Brewers	OF	Kentucky
9	Mark Kotsay	Florida Marlins	OF	Cal State Fullerton
10	Eric Chavez	Oakland Athletics	3B	Mount Carmel HS (CA)
11	Adam Eaton	Philadelphia Phillies	P	Snohomish HS (WA)
12	Bobby Seay	Chicago White Sox	P	Sarasota HS (FL)
13	Rob Stratton	New York Mets	OF	San Marcos HS (CA)
14	Dermal Brown	Kansas City Royals	OF	Marlboro Central HS (NY)
15	Matt Halloran	San Diego Padres	SS	Chancellor HS (VA)
16	Joe Lawrence	Toronto Blue Jays (Note: Pick from Baltimore Orioles as compensation for signing of free agent Roberto Alomar)	SS	Barbe HS (LA)
17	Todd Noel	Chicago Cubs	P	North Vermillion HS (LA)
18	R. A. Dickey	Texas Rangers	P	Tennessee
19	Mark Johnson	Houston Astros	P	Hawaii
20	Eric Milton	New York Yankees (Note: Pick from California Angels as compensation for signing of free agent Randy Velarde)	P	Maryland
21	Jake Westbrook	Colorado Rockies	P	Madison County HS (GA)
22	Gil Meche	Seattle Mariners	P	Acadiana HS (LA)
23	Damian Rolls	Los Angeles Dodgers	3B	Schlagle HS (KS)
24	Sam Marsonek	Texas Rangers (Note: Pick from New York Yankees as compensation for signing of free agent Kenny Rogers)	P	Jesuit HS (FL)
25	John Oliver	Cincinnati Reds	OF	Lake-Lehman HS (PA)
26	Josh Garrett	Boston Red Sox	P	South Spencer HS (IN)
27	A.J. Zapp	Atlanta Braves	1B	Center Grove HS (IN)
28	Danny Peoples	Cleveland Indians	1B	Texas
29	Paul Wilder	Tampa Bay Devil Rays	OF	Cary HS (NC)
30	Nick Bierbrodt	Arizona Diamondbacks	P	Millikan HS (CA)

== Supplemental first round selections ==
Pick	Player	Team	Position	School
31	Pete Tucci	Toronto Blue Jays (Note: Supplemental pick for loss of free agent Roberto Alomar)	1B, OF	Providence College
32	Corey Lee	Texas Rangers (Note: Supplemental pick for loss of free agent Kenny Rogers)	P	North Carolina State University
33	Matt McClendon	Cincinnati Reds (Note: Supplemental pick for loss of free agent Ron Gant)	P	Dr. Phillips HS (Orlando, FL)
34	Chris Reitsma	Boston Red Sox (Note: Supplemental pick for loss of free agent Erik Hanson)	P	Calgary Christian HS (Calgary, AB)
35	Jason Marquis	Atlanta Braves (Note: Supplemental pick for failure to sign first round pick Chad Hutchinson)	P	Tottenville HS (Staten Island, NY)

== Other notable players ==
- Jacque Jones, 2nd round, 37th overall by the Minnesota Twins
- Milton Bradley, 2nd round, 40th overall by the Montreal Expos
- Joe Espada, 2nd round, 45th overall by the Oakland Athletics
- Jimmy Rollins, 2nd round, 46th overall by the Philadelphia Phillies
- A. J. Hinch, 3rd round, 75th overall by the Oakland Athletics
- Chad Durbin, 3rd round, 79th overall by the Kansas City Royals
- Scott Schoeneweis, 3rd round, 85th overall by the California Angels
- Shawn Chacón, 3rd round, 90th overall by the Colorado Rockies
- Alex Cora, 3rd round, 88th overall by the Los Angeles Dodgers
- Nick Johnson, 3rd round, 89th overall by the New York Yankees
- Robert Fick, 5th round, 131st overall by the Detroit Tigers
- Joe Crede, 5th round, 137th overall by the Chicago Sox
- Brad Penny, 5th round, 155th overall by the Arizona Diamondbacks
- Jeremy Giambi, 6th round, 169th overall by the Kansas City Royals
- Casey Blake, 7th round, 189th overall by the Toronto Blue Jays
- Mark DeRosa, 7th round, 212th overall by the Atlanta Braves
- Willie Bloomquist, 8th round, 237th overall by the Seattle Mariners, but did not sign
- Justin Duchscherer, 8th round, 241st overall by the Boston Red Sox
- Doug Davis, 10th round, 293rd overall by the Texas Rangers
- Shea Hillenbrand, 10th round, 301st overall by the Boston Red Sox
- John McDonald, 12th round, 363rd overall by the Cleveland Indians
- Mike Lincoln, 13th round, 367th overall by the Minnesota Twins
- Chad Bradford, 13th round, 377th overall by the Chicago White Sox
- Jamey Carroll, 14th round, 400th overall by the Montreal Expos
- Kevin Gregg, 15th round, 435th overall by the Oakland Athletics
- Josh Towers, 15th round, 441st overall by the Baltimore Orioles
- Mike Gonzalez, 17th round, 486th overall by the Pittsburgh Pirates, but did not sign
- Mark Hendrickson, 19th round, 563rd overall by the Texas Rangers, but did not sign
- Wade Miller, 20th round, 594th overall by the Houston Astros
- Mike MacDougal, 22nd round, 651st overall by the Baltimore Orioles, but did not sign
- Aaron Harang, 22nd round, 661st overall by the Boston Red Sox, but did not sign
- Roy Oswalt, 23rd round, 684th overall by the Houston Astros
- Ted Lilly, 23rd round, 688th overall by the Los Angeles Dodgers
- Joe Beimel, 26th round, 773rd overall by the Texas Rangers, but did not sign
- Kiko Calero, 27th round, 799th overall by the Kansas City Royals
- Willie Harris, 28th round, 816th overall by the Pittsburgh Pirates, but did not sign
- Kyle Lohse, 29th round, 862nd overall by the Chicago Cubs
- Marcus Thames, 30th round, 899th overall by the New York Yankees
- Freddy Sanchez, 30th round, 902nd overall by the Atlanta Braves, but did not sign
- Mike Lamb, 31st round, 907th overall by the Minnesota Twins, but did not sign
- Travis Hafner, 31st round, 923rd overall by the Texas Rangers
- Orlando Hudson, 33rd round, 969th overall by the Toronto Blue Jays, but did not sign
- Matt Guerrier, 33rd round, 979th overall by the Kansas City Royals, but did not sign
- Dan Wheeler, 34th round, 1024th overall by the Tampa Bay Devil Rays
- Jason Michaels, 44th round, 1314th overall by the Tampa Bay Devil Rays, but did not sign
- Chris Capuano, 45th round, 1316th overall by the Pittsburgh Pirates, but did not sign
- Juan Pierre, 48th round, 1406th overall by the Seattle Mariners, but did not sign
- Greg Dobbs, 52nd round, 1492nd overall by the Seattle Mariners, but did not sign
- Rob Mackowiak, 53rd round, 1498th overall by the Pittsburgh Pirates
- Marcus Giles, 53rd round, 1511th overall by the Atlanta Braves
- Jason Jennings, 54th round, 1531st overall by the Arizona Diamondbacks, but did not sign
- David Riske, 56th round, 1559th overall by the Cleveland Indians
- Barry Zito, 59th round, 1587th overall by the Seattle Mariners, but did not sign
- Geoff Duncan, 69th round, 1647th overall by the Florida Marlins
- Travis Phelps, 89th round, 1721st overall by the Tampa Bay Devil Rays
- Clay Condrey, 94th round, 1730th overall by the New York Yankees, but did not sign. Condrey is the lowest drafted player to ever appear in a major league game.

=== NFL player drafted ===
- Quincy Carter, 2nd round, 52nd overall by the Chicago Cubs

== See also ==
- Major League Baseball
- Major League Baseball draft
- List of MLB first overall draft choices
- Rule 5 draft

Preceded by Darin Erstad	1st Overall Picks; Kris Benson	Succeeded by Matt Anderson
