= Unity High School =

United High School may refer to:

- Unity School District (Wisconsin) in Balsam Lake, Wisconsin
- Unity High School (Sudan) in Khartoum, Sudan
- Unity High School (Oakland, California)
- Unity High School (Mendon, Illinois)
- Unity High School (Tolono, Illinois)
- Unity High School (Duluth, Minnesota)
- Unity High School at the Door in Manhattan, New York, New York
