= Isaac Haqq =

- Born: Isaac Richard; July 1957 (age 68)
- Education: MBA, 1985
- Alma mater: Columbia University
- Occupations: Consultant and community college instructor
- Employer: San Francisco College Center
- Organization: University Preparatory Charter Academy
- Criminal penalty: 3 years probation
- Children: 2

Isaac Haqq (born Isaac Richard in July 1957) is an American businessman, educator, and former municipal politician.

== Personal life ==
Born Isaac Richard in July 1957, he was raised in Pasadena, California by a single mother as the eldest of 8 siblings. He would later change his last name to Haqq after a religious conversion to Islam.

== Schooling ==
Haqq graduated from Pitzer College, a small liberal arts college in Claremont, California just east of Los Angeles. He later earned a master's degree in business from Columbia University.

== Career ==
He was a member of the city council of Pasadena, California in the early 1990s while working as an investment banker for an Orange County firm. While on the city council Haqq gained a reputation for violence:, he broke someone's nose, swiped campaign signs, threatened the housing chief, berated a women's shelter worker and did three years probation for, among other things, throwing his sunglasses at a city bus.

In 2001, Haqq opened University Preparatory Charter Academy in Oakland, which helped hundreds of inner-city kids graduate from high school and go to college. He resigned in July 2007, following allegations that the school's attendance records and grades were falsified to allow failing students to graduate. The school faced closure after these allegations.

As of 2014, Isaac Richard was the director of an entity called the San Francisco College Center.

== Personal life ==
Haqq is father of two. He currently resides in Oakland, California with his wife Sharon.

Political offices
Preceded by John C. Crowley	Member of the Pasadena City Council for the 1st District; 1991–1997	Succeeded by Joyce Streator
