= Deon Strother =

American football player (born 1972)

No. 41, 33
- Position: Running back

Personal information
- Born: April 12, 1972 (age 54); Saginaw, Michigan, U.S.
- Listed height: 5 ft 11 in (1.80 m)
- Listed weight: 213 lb (97 kg)

Career information
- High school: Skyline (Oakland, California)
- College: USC (1990–1993)
- NFL draft: 1994: undrafted

Career history
- Denver Broncos (1994); Ottawa Rough Riders (1995)

Awards and highlights
- Second-team All-Pac-10 (1993)
- Stats at Pro Football Reference

Deonshawn L. Strother (born April 12, 1972) is an American former professional football running back who played one season with the Denver Broncos of the National Football League (NFL). He played college football at the University of Southern California. He was also a member of the Ottawa Rough Riders of the Canadian Football League (CFL).

== Early life and college ==
Deonshawn L. Strother was born on April 12, 1972, in Saginaw, Michigan. He attended Skyline High School in Oakland, California.

He lettered for the USC Trojans from 1990 to 1993. He rushed 19 times for 108 yards and one touchdown during his freshman season in 1990. In 1991, he rushed 129 times for 614 yards and seven touchdowns while also catching seven passes for 21 yards and throwing one touchdown. In 1992, he only recorded 19 rushing attempts for 41 yards and one touchdown, ten receptions for 86 yards, and one passing touchdown. His senior year in 1993, he totaled 60 carries for 310 yards and five touchdowns, and 51 catches for 500 and one touchdown, earning second-team All-Pac-10 recognition by the coaches.

== Professional career ==
After going undrafted in the 1994 NFL draft, Strother signed with the Denver Broncos on April 27, 1994. He was waived on August 23 and signed to the team's practice squad on August 30. He was promoted to the active roster on December 15 and played in two games for the Broncos during the 1994 season without recording any statistics. He was released on August 22, 1995.

Strother dressed in seven games for the Ottawa Rough Riders of the Canadian Football League in 1995, rushing 27 times for 96 yards and one touchdown while also catching 10 passes for 93 yards. He also lost one fumble and recorded two defensive tackles and three special teams tackles.
