= Skyline High School (Oakland, California) =

Location
- 12250 Skyline Boulevard; Oakland, California 94619; United States; 37°47′56″N 122°9′42″W

Information
- Type: Public high school
- Motto: Veritas
- Established: 1959
- School district: Oakland Unified School District
- Oversight: Western Association of Schools and Colleges
- Principal: Rebecca Huang
- Faculty: 143
- Teaching staff: 84.51 (FTE)
- Grades: 9–12
- Enrollment: 1,432 (2023–2024)
- Student to teacher ratio: 16.94
- Campus: Urban; 45 acres (0.18km^{2})
- Colors: Red; White; Black
- Athletics: Oakland Athletic League
- Mascot: Titan
- Accreditation: Western Association of Schools and Colleges
- National ranking: 25
- Newspaper: The Skyline Oracle
- Yearbook: The Olympian
- Website: www.ousd.org/skyline
- School entrance, 2009

Skyline High School is a public high school in Oakland, California, United States. It is part of the Oakland Unified School District. The school opened in 1959 and occupies a 45-acre (180,000 m^{2}) campus at the crest of the Oakland hills, near the Redwood Regional Park.

== History ==
Skyline High School was developed in the 1950s as a "Hill Area High School" to relieve pressure on Oakland's three high schools. The building was designed by Warnecke & Warnecke and constructed by Branagh and Son on a vacant 31-acre site that was graded in 1959. It was built with 50 classrooms and a capacity of 1,626. The name Skyline High School was chosen in February 1961; the school opened in fall 1961, and was formally dedicated in early December 1961. Planners envisaged drawing 700 students from Oakland High School, 400 from Fremont High School, 200 from Castlemont High School, and 125 from Oakland Technical High School to make up the initial enrollment. The first senior class graduated in 1965.

Concerns were raised before the school opened that its attendance zone in the Oakland Hills, the most affluent and whitest area of the city, would increase de facto segregation in public education. David McCullum of the Oakland NAACP told the Oakland School Board that the proposed boundaries would create "a private prep school supported by public funds", and politically liberal parents within the boundaries complained that attending the new school would harm their children by depriving them of contact with Black peers. Prior to the school's opening, the zone boundary was extended further west to include more low income and minority residents, and in 1965, a limited open enrollment plan was adopted expanding the number of junior high schools whose students could elect to attend Skyline. The siphoning off of able students who choose to attend Skyline has remained a concern in Oakland.

In January 1973, the Home Arts building was destroyed in an arson fire.

A number of shooting incidents have taken place at Skyline in the 2020s. On September 5, 2023, the school was placed in lockdown after a report of shots fired, and three juveniles were arrested. In May 2024, the school's graduation ceremony was curtailed after a fight between students led to a shooting that wounded three students. One person was arrested and charged with aggravated assault. On November 12, 2025, a 15-year-old student was shot at Skyline High. Two suspects were arrested.

The founding principal was George C. Bliss, who had been principal of Oakland Technical High School. Rebecca Huang was named principal in 2023. Previous principals include Vinh Trinh, from 2012 to 2015, and Vinnie Blye as principal and Nancy Bloom as comprehensive community high school director, from 2016.

== Academics ==
Selmer Berg auditorium, home to the Farnsworth Theater at Skyline High School

In the early 1980s, Skyline tested a Great Books curriculum as one of the first trials of Mortimer Adler's Paideia Proposal: 75 students studied 50 books over a year, using the Socratic method, with results that the then principal described as "stellar".

Skyline introduced a freshman program in 2009 called Atlas Freshman House. 9th graders are assigned to an Atlas "house", a cohort within which they prepare for their 10th-grade year. The students share the same four teachers for math, biology, English, and where required special education, with each teacher serving as an advisor to 25 students. Freshmen also attend bi-monthly "advisory" classes. In spring semester, they apply to their choice of Linked Learning Pathway. Pathways are "schools within a school" centered on career fields, such as Arts, Entertainment, and Design (AED), Community Health & Education (CHED), and Green Energy. Students study with the same team of teachers and group of students from 10th to 12th grades in many courses.

As of 2026, Skyline is ranked 3rd out of 19 high schools in the Oakland Unified School District by US News & World Report.

== Athletics ==
Skyline High School competes in the Oakland Athletic League. As of October 2026 it offers 18 sports. Its teams are the Titans.

Under John Beam, who was head football coach from 1987 to 2003, when he moved to Laney College, Skyline won the league championship 15 times and had four undefeated seasons.

The Skyline basketball team was the focus of Skyline: One Season, One Team, One City, a 1994 book by San Francisco Chronicle sportswriter Tim Keown.

== Demographics ==
Skyline High School was almost entirely white on opening. The school's demographics have changed over the years. In 2024-2025 Skyline had more than 1,250 students with an approximate demographic distribution of:

- 39.8% Hispanic American
- 20.6% African American
- 13.3% White American
- 12.4% Asian American
- 12.0% mixed race
- 1.4% Native Hawaiian or Pacific Islanders
- 0.6% Not Specified
- 0.2% Native American

== Notable alumni ==
=== Entertainment ===
- Amazon Eve – model and actress
- Del the Funky Homosapien – rapper of the group Hieroglyphics
- Brely Evans – actress, singer and comedian
- Tom Hanks – Hollywood actor and two-time Academy Award-winner
- John Landgraf - President of FX and television producer
- Sunspot Jonz – founder of Mystik Journeymen and Living Legends
- Kathreen Khavari – actress, writer and producer
- Ledisi – singer, songwriter, actress, and author
- Nnegest Likké – film writer and director
- LaToya London – American Idol semifinalist, season 3
- Goapele Mohlabane – soul/R&B singer and songwriter
- Carlos Ramirez – creator of the Trollface
- E.C. Scott – electric blues singer, songwriter and record producer
- DJ Toure – member of Hieroglyphics collective, record producer, DJ and drummer
- Aaron Woolfolk – film director, screenwriter

=== Athletics ===
- C. W. Anderson – wrestler on Extreme Championship Wrestling
- Davone Bess – NFL wide receiver
- Will Blackwell – former NFL wide receiver for Pittsburgh Steelers, returned to Skyline as a coach
- Theotis Brown – NFL running back for the St. Louis Cardinals, the Seattle Seahawks, and the Kansas City Chiefs
- Yonus Davis – CFL running back for the BC Lions
- Greg Foster – former NBA player
- Derrick Gardner – football player
- Dwight Garner – NFL football player
- Rod Gilmore – ESPN college football commentator & former Stanford football player
- Marcus Jensen – former MLB catcher and gold medalist in the 2000 Summer Olympics
- Brian Johnson – former MLB catcher
- Bill Lester – Grand-Am Rolex Sports Car Series and NASCAR Craftsman Truck Series driver
- Gary Payton – former NBA point guard for the Seattle Supersonics
- Bip Roberts – former MLB All-Star second baseman, returned to Skyline as a coach
- Kevin Smith – former NFL tight end for the Oakland Raiders and Green Bay Packers
- Marvel Smith – NFL offensive linesman for the Pittsburgh Steelers
- Destiny Smith-Barnett – sprinter
- Roy Sommer – NHL center for the Edmonton Oilers
- Deon Strother – NFL and CFL player
- Frank Summers – NFL fullback for the Pittsburgh Steelers
- Peter Thibeaux – former NBA player for the Golden State Warriors
- Kwame Vaughn – basketball player for Maccabi Haifa in the Israeli Basketball National League
- Gerris Wilkinson – NFL linebacker for the New York Giants

=== Other ===
- Matt Fong – California State Treasurer, 1995–1999
- Haben Girma – deafblind lawyer
- Paul F. Lorence – captain, U.S. Air Force, killed in action during Operation El Dorado Canyon
- Favianna Rodriguez – artist and activist
- Libby Schaaf – former Mayor of Oakland

== See also ==
- List of Oakland, California high schools
