= Scott Boras =

American sports agent (born 1952)

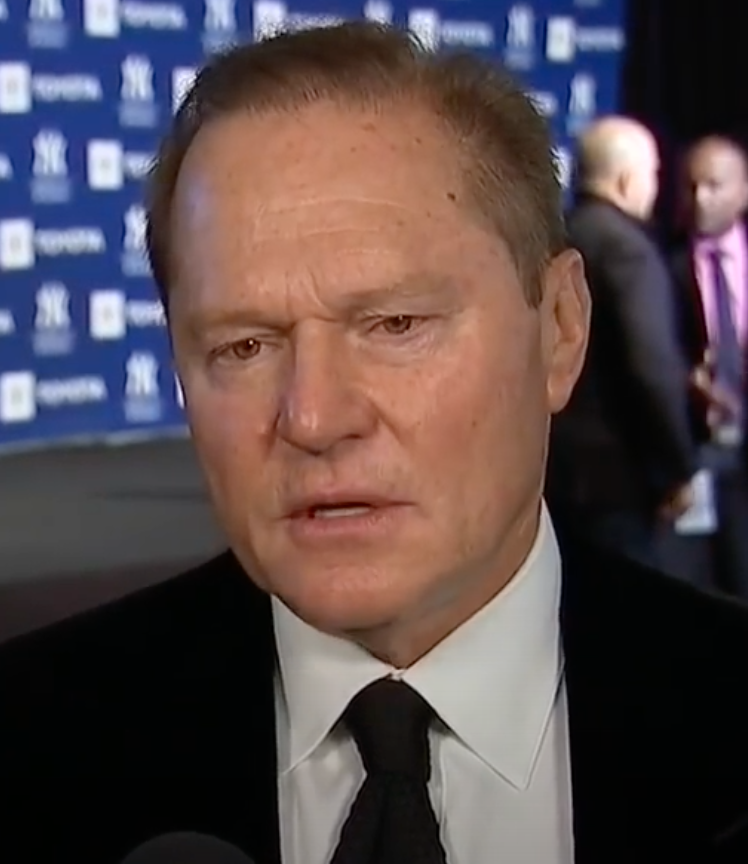
- Boras in 2019
- Born: Scott Dean Boras; November 2, 1952 (age 74); Sacramento, California, U.S.
- Education: University of the Pacific (PharmD, JD)
- Occupation: Sports agent
- Years active: 1980–present
- Employer: Boras Corporation (CEO)
- Website: www.borascorp.com

Scott Dean Boras (born November 2, 1952) is an American sports agent, specializing in baseball. He is the founder, owner and president of the Boras Corporation, a sports agency based in Newport Beach, California, that represents roughly 175 professional baseball clients.

Since 2013, Forbes magazine has named Boras the "Most Powerful Sports Agent in the World." In 2019 and 2022, contracts signed by his clients totaled more than $1 billion in the month of December. In 2024, Boras negotiated what is as of February 2026 the largest contract in sports history on behalf of client Juan Soto; the contract's total value was $765 million.

== Early life and playing career ==
Scott Dean Boras was born on November 2, 1952, in Sacramento, California and grew up in Elk Grove, California, the son of a dairy farmer. He attended the University of the Pacific and made the baseball team as a walk on. He led the team with a .312 batting average in 1972. As of 2009, Boras was in the top 10 in school history in multiple offensive categories. Boras was inducted into the Pacific Athletics Hall of Fame in 1995, and the baseball team's annual "Most Improved Player" award is named in his honor. Following his college career, Boras played four years of minor league baseball for the St. Louis Cardinals and Chicago Cubs organizations. Boras made the Florida State League All-Star team in 1976, but knee problems shortened his career and he retired with a career batting average of .288. Boras received his Doctor of Pharmacy degree from the University of the Pacific in 1977.

Following his playing career, Boras returned to the University of the Pacific, earning his Juris Doctor degree from the university's McGeorge School of Law in 1982. After law school, Boras worked as an associate in the pharmaceutical defense department of the Chicago firm Rooks, Pitts & Poust (now Dykema Gossett), defending drug companies against class-action lawsuits.

== Boras Corporation ==
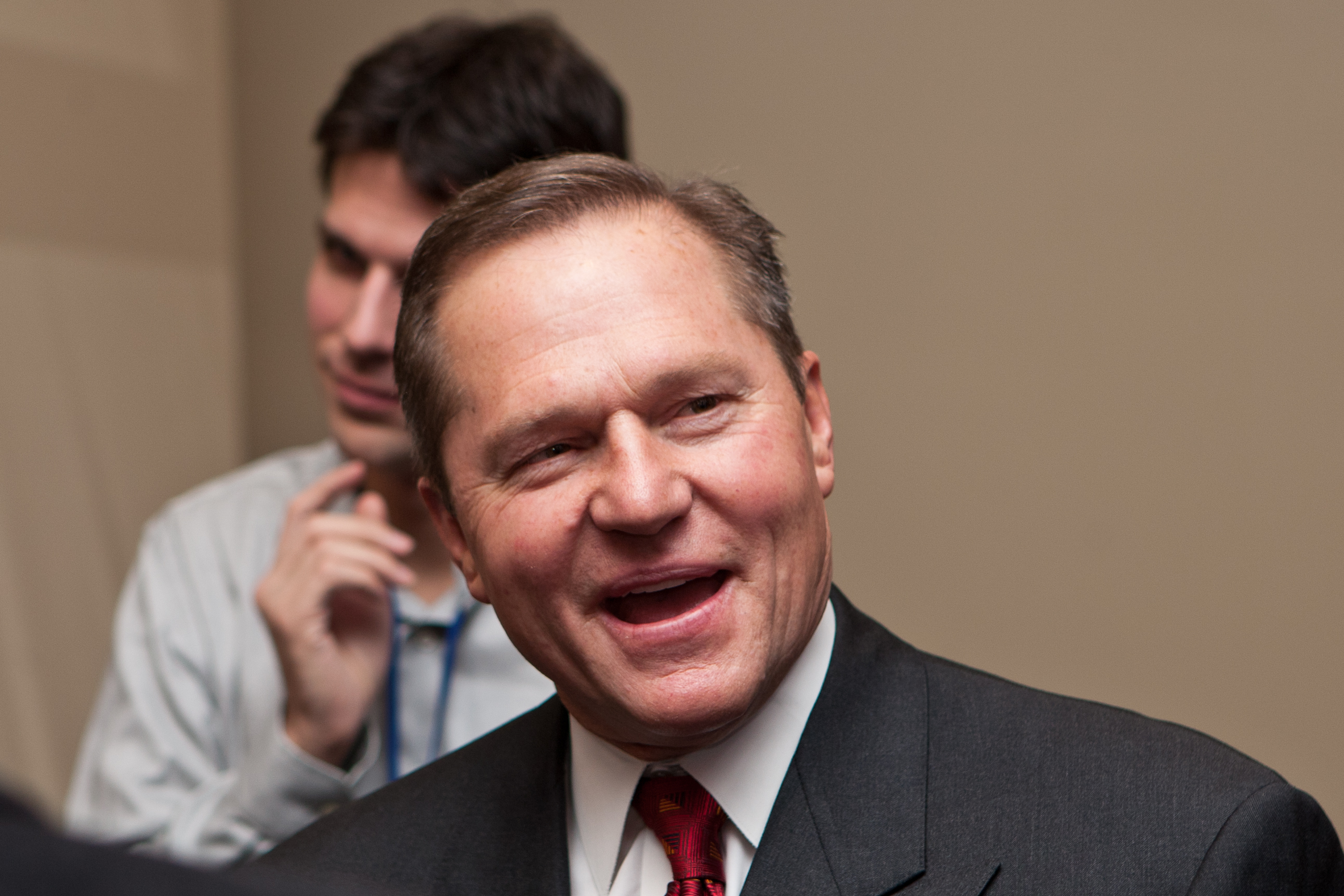
Boras in 2010

Boras's start as an agent came representing Manny Trillo, a former major league second baseman for the Chicago Cubs, Philadelphia Phillies, and other teams, and Bill Caudill, a former minor league teammate and closer for the Seattle Mariners, both of whom now work for Boras. By 1980, he had decided his calling was as a baseball agent. In 1983, Boras negotiated one of the largest contracts in baseball history, $7.5 million for Caudill; and not long afterward, Boras left his law firm job to represent players full time.

Today, Boras is the president and owner of the Boras Corporation, a baseball-only sports agency. In 2014, the Boras Corporation was named by Forbes magazine as the most valuable single-sport agency in the world.

Boras and his company Boras Corporation have become known for record-setting contracts for their free agent and amateur draft clients. Boras was the first baseball agent to negotiate contracts in excess of $50 million: Greg Maddux, five years, $57.5 million in 1997; $100 million Kevin Brown, seven years, $105 million in 1998; and $200 million Alex Rodriguez, 10 years, $252 million in 2000.

Boras has represented many of the elite players in each year's amateur draft and been a strong advocate for increasing player compensation. Boras' first record-setting contract for a drafted player was $150,000 for Tim Belcher in 1983. Since then, Boras clients regularly pushed draft compensation higher, starting with $247,500 for Andy Benes in 1988; a $1.01 million guarantee for Ben McDonald in 1989, including a $350,000 bonus; a $1.2 million guarantee, including a $500,000 bonus for Todd Van Poppel in 1990; $1.55 million for Brien Taylor in 1991; continuing through $8.5 million for J. D. Drew in 1998 and $9.5 million for Mark Teixeira in 2001. In 2009, Boras clients broke several draft records, led by Stephen Strasburg, who surpassed the $15 million barrier with the largest contract in draft history at that time with $15.1 million; Donavan Tate, who received the largest signing bonus ever given to a high school player at $6.25 million; and Jacob Turner, who received the largest signing bonus ever given to a high school pitcher at $4.7 million.

The Boras Corporation operates out of a $20 million, 23,000-square-foot (2,100 m^{2}), two-story, glass-and-steel building in Newport Beach, California. Subsidiary companies include Boras Marketing, which does memorabilia, marketing, and endorsements; and the Boras Sports Training Institute for strength/conditioning and sports psychology. Many of the 75-person staff are former major leaguers, including Bob Brower, Don Carman, Bill Caudill, Scott Chiamparino, Mike Fischlin, Calvin Murray, Jeff Musselman, Domingo Ramos and Kurt Stillwell. The company has scouts across the United States, Asia and Latin America. Staff also includes an MIT-trained economist, a former NASA computer engineer, three lawyers, five personal trainers, and an investment team, although the firm does not provide investment services for clients. Also on staff is a sports psychologist and a 14-person research staff charged with watching each day's games and reporting to Boras.

== Reputation ==
Over the course of his career, Boras has represented hundreds of players on all 30 major league teams and has participated in dozens of high-profile negotiations. Boras' specialty is the record-breaking contract, which he says is the most difficult to achieve because it then provides an "umbrella" from which other players can benefit. Boras is well known for identifying sources of leverage for his clients and using them for the clients' advantage. This has included advising draft picks to return to school instead of signing, taking advantage of the right to go to salary arbitration hearings, and advising superstars to wait for free agency instead of taking "hometown discount" contracts. This does not endear him to fans, who regularly side with their favorite teams and not individual players. Boras, however, has said his job is to represent his clients' interests, even if it means weathering public criticism. Boras' innovative strategies have benefited his clients enough that Major League Baseball has changed its rules in response to his actions on multiple occasions. This has led to descriptions of Boras ranging from "baseball's most hated man" and "baseball's answer to Lord Voldemort" to the man "players can't afford to live without."

== Notable deals ==
=== 1980s ===
- Boras' first major contract showdown was between Bill Caudill and the Toronto Blue Jays in February 1985. Caudill was eligible for salary arbitration, and Boras negotiated a $1.5 million contract that made Caudill the second-highest paid reliever in the game. Caudill was a former minor league teammate of Boras.
- In 1988, Boras represented the top three picks in the amateur draft: Andy Benes, Mark Lewis and Steve Avery. Benes signed for a $235,000 bonus, the largest in baseball history at the time.
- The next year, in 1989, Boras negotiated the first multi-year major league contract ever given to a baseball-only amateur, a $1.01 million deal for first overall pick Ben McDonald with the Baltimore Orioles that included a $350,000 signing bonus.

=== 1990s ===
- In 1990, Boras stunned baseball officials by securing a record $1.2 million guaranteed major league contract for the #14 pick in the draft, high school pitcher Todd Van Poppel. The contract included a $500,000 signing bonus.
- In 1991, Boras again set a record by securing a $1.55 million bonus from the New York Yankees for high school phenomenon Brien Taylor.
- In 1992, Boras negotiated a record five-year, $28 million contract for Greg Maddux with the Atlanta Braves, eclipsing the second-best offer by $9 million. The contract trailed only David Cone's contract in terms of annual value and was two years longer.
- In 1996, Boras used an obscure provision in the major league rules to have draft picks Matt White (seventh overall pick, San Francisco Giants) and Bobby Seay (12th overall pick, Chicago White Sox) declared free agents. White and Seay both then signed with the expansion Tampa Bay Devil Rays, with White receiving a $10.2 million contract and Seay receiving a $3 million bonus, significantly more than what they would have received via the draft process. The following year, Major League Baseball changed its rules in response to Boras' success in circumventing the draft, which had resulted in at least $25 million in extra money for his clients. For many years, being "outsmarted" by Boras and losing Seay remained a sore spot for White Sox owner Jerry Reinsdorf, one of Commissioner Bud Selig's closest allies.
- In 1997, Boras advised draft pick J. D. Drew not to accept the Philadelphia Phillies' $2.6 million offer. Drew instead signed a professional contract with the independent St. Paul Saints. Boras and the MLBPA then filed a grievance to have Drew declared a free agent since only "amateurs" could be subject to what was then known as the "amateur draft". Boras won the argument, but the arbitrator ruled he could not grant Drew free agency since he was not a member of the MLBPA. Instead, Drew re-entered the draft the following year and signed with the St. Louis Cardinals for nearly three times the Phillies' best offer. Major League Baseball again was forced to amend its rules because of Boras; the draft is now called the "First Year Player Draft" as a result of the Drew grievance.
- Following the 1997 season, Boras broke the $50 million barrier by negotiating a five-year, $57.5 million contract for Greg Maddux with the Atlanta Braves, making Maddux the highest paid player in the game.
- Only a year later, in 1998, Boras broke the $100 million barrier by negotiating a seven-year, $105 million contract for Kevin Brown with the Los Angeles Dodgers. Brown dethroned Maddux as the highest-paid player in the game.
- Also in 1998, Boras negotiated a seven-year, $87.5 million contract for Bernie Williams to stay with the New York Yankees, even though the Yankees had made a public statement that they would not exceed $60 million for Williams.
- In 1999, Boras filed a grievance on behalf of Adrián Beltré because the Los Angeles Dodgers falsified Beltré's Dominican Republic birth records prior to signing him in 1994. Team representatives changed the records in order to sign Beltré when he was only 15 (under baseball rules international prospects are not eligible to sign until they are 16). In response to Boras's grievance, Commissioner Bud Selig awarded Beltré damages of $48,500. Additionally, Selig imposed significant penalties on the Dodgers.

=== 2000s ===
==== 2000 ====
- In 2000, under Boras's supervision, high school prospect Landon Powell earned his GED following his junior year of high school and then filed the necessary paperwork to make him eligible for that year's draft. Powell went undrafted, since the major league teams did not expect him to be draft eligible, making him a free agent. Whether because of Powell's ability, his pricetag, or internal resentment within Major League Baseball about his successful end-run around the draft, Powell did not sign, instead enrolling at the University of South Carolina.
- At the baseball Winter Meetings following the 2000 season, Boras negotiated two record-breaking contracts for clients who had gone first and second overall in the 1993 draft. The former second pick, Darren Dreifort, was the first to sign, with Boras finalizing a five-year, $55 million contract for Dreifort to stay with the Los Angeles Dodgers on December 11.
- On December 12, Boras finalized what was then the largest contract in professional sports history, a 10-year, $252 million contract for former first overall pick Alex Rodriguez to play for the Texas Rangers. The contract doubled the previous record for a player contract in an American team sport (Kevin Garnett's $126 million contract with the Minnesota Timberwolves) and exceeded the price owner Tom Hicks had paid for the entire Rangers franchise three years earlier.

==== 2001 ====
- In February, Boras and Andruw Jones defeated the Atlanta Braves in salary arbitration, with Jones earning an arbitration-record $8.2 million salary in only his second year of arbitration eligibility. The Jones decision remained the largest salary arbitration win for any player in history until 2008.
- In December, Boras and free agent Barry Bonds, the reigning National League MVP, surprised the San Francisco Giants by accepting the club's offer of salary arbitration. Boras eventually negotiated a five-year, $90 million contract for the 37-year-old slugger.
- On December 22, Boras finalized a five-year, $65 million contract for Chan Ho Park with the Texas Rangers. The deal made Park one of the highest-paid pitchers in the game and team history at that time.

==== 2002 ====
- In December, for the second year in a row, a Boras free agent client surprised his former team by accepting salary arbitration. This time, it was Greg Maddux accepting the offer from the Atlanta Braves. Boras eventually negotiated a record-breaking $14.75 million contract for the star pitcher. At the time, the contract was the largest one-year contract in baseball history.

==== 2003 ====
- In December, Boras was a part of complex multi-party negotiations that would have resulted in Alex Rodriguez being traded from the Texas Rangers to the Boston Red Sox. Boras and Rodriguez offered to accept $12 million in reduced salaries in return for marketing rights and the right for Rodriguez to be a free agent after the 2005 season. The trade was eventually vetoed by the MLBPA because it would have cost Rodriguez $30 million in previously guaranteed compensation, setting what the union considered a bad precedent regarding the renegotiation of guaranteed contracts.

==== 2004 ====
- In February, Boras successfully negotiated the trade of Alex Rodriguez from the Texas Rangers to the New York Yankees. Once again, because of the complexity of Rodriguez's contract, several contractual modifications were necessary for the trade to happen. Unlike the contractual modifications involved in the unconsummated trade Boras negotiated in 2003, the contractual modifications involved in this trade did not sacrifice previously guaranteed compensation.
- On December 16, following a breakout year and near-MVP season, Boras negotiated a five-year, $64 million contract for Adrian Beltre to sign with the Seattle Mariners.
- Following the season, Boras negotiated a five-year, $55 million contract for J. D. Drew to play for the Los Angeles Dodgers. The contract included the right for Drew to opt out of the contract after two years, which he did after the 2006 season.

==== 2005 ====
- In January, Boras negotiated his third contract with a value in excess of $100 million as Carlos Beltrán signed with the New York Mets for $119 million guaranteed over seven years.

==== 2006 ====
- In February, Boras won a salary arbitration hearing for Kyle Lohse for the second year in a row, defeating the Minnesota Twins and earning Lohse a raise to $3.95 million. Lohse became the first player to win back-to-back arbitration cases since 1991.
- Following the season, Boras advised J. D. Drew to opt out of the final three years and $33 million remaining on his contract with the Los Angeles Dodgers. Boras then negotiated a five-year, $70 million contract for Drew with the Boston Red Sox. The contract was not finalized until January 26, 2007, because Boras and the Red Sox had to develop special contract language regarding potential injury to Drew's shoulder. Drew had the shoulder surgically repaired earlier in his career.
- On December 14, after weeks of speculation, public posturing, and intensely scrutinized negotiations, Boras finalized a six-year, $52 million contract for Japanese superstar pitcher Daisuke Matsuzaka to play for the Boston Red Sox. Matsuzaka was not a free agent, as the Red Sox had paid an additional $51.1 million to his Japanese team for exclusive negotiating rights, meaning his only alternative to signing with the Red Sox was to return to Japan.
- On December 28, Boras negotiated a record-breaking seven-year, $126 million contract with the San Francisco Giants for Barry Zito. The contract was the largest ever given to a pitcher in baseball history.

==== 2007 ====
- The 2007 Collective Bargaining Agreement between Major League Baseball and the MLBPA imposed an August 15 deadline for draft picks to sign. This was in direct response to Boras's successful strategy of advising draft picks like Jason Varitek, J. D. Drew, Stephen Drew, Jered Weaver, Luke Hochevar and Max Scherzer to wait as long as possible to sign and marked at least the third time baseball rules were changed because of Boras.
- On August 13, Boras finalized a record-breaking $7.3 million contract with the Detroit Tigers for the 27th overall draft pick, Rick Porcello. The four-year major league contract, which ended up paying Porcello over $10 million, was the largest contract ever given to a high school player.
- On October 28, Boras client Alex Rodriguez exercised his right to opt out of Rodriguez's original 10-year, $252 million contract with the New York Yankees, with three years and $72 million remaining. Boras and Rodriguez were criticized for the timing of the decision, which leaked during Game 4 of the 2007 World Series. Rodriguez met with Yankees officials in Miami, and afterward Rodriguez instructed Boras to finalize a record-breaking 10-year, $275 million contract. Boras and the Yankees then crafted a series of unique marketing bonuses that would pay Rodriguez an additional $30 million for tying and surpassing Willie Mays, Babe Ruth, Hank Aaron, and Barry Bonds on the all-time home run list. The high-profile opt-out and negotiations strained Boras and Rodriguez's relationship, and Rodriguez hired Madonna's manager to be his marketing representative. Boras retained his role as Rodriguez's baseball agent and later reported that their relationship was "repaired".
- On December 6, Boras client Andruw Jones signed a two-year, $36.2 million deal to join the Los Angeles Dodgers. Jones was coming off a down year where his batting average had fallen to .222. However, after a miserable 2008 season, Boras would negotiate a buyout for Jones.

==== 2008 ====
- On July 31, Boras negotiated away the option years on Manny Ramirez's contract with the Boston Red Sox as part of Ramirez's trade to the Los Angeles Dodgers, making Ramirez a free agent two years early.
- On August 15, negotiations between Boras and the Pittsburgh Pirates regarding second overall draft pick Pedro Alvarez went beyond the midnight deadline for draft picks to sign. Major League Baseball unilaterally extended the deadline, and Boras and the MLBPA filed a grievance. After weeks of legal wrangling, Alvarez signed a major league contract for $6.355 million.
- In December, Boras negotiated an eight-year, $180 million contract for Mark Teixeira with the New York Yankees, making Teixeira the highest-paid first baseman in baseball history and the third highest-paid player in all of baseball, behind only Alex Rodriguez and Derek Jeter.

==== 2009 ====
- In August, Boras negotiated the largest contract in draft history for first overall pick Stephen Strasburg, a $15.1 million major league contract with the Washington Nationals.
- Several other Boras clients also signed record-breaking deals following the 2009 draft, including Donavan Tate's $6.25 million signing bonus with the San Diego Padres (the largest ever for a high school player), Jacob Turner's $4.7 million signing bonus with the Detroit Tigers (the largest ever given to a high school pitcher, part of a major league contract that could pay Turner an additional $4 million) and second-overall pick Dustin Ackley's $6 million signing bonus (tied for the largest upfront bonus in history, part of a major league contract worth up to $10 million with $7.5 million guaranteed).

=== 2010s ===
==== 2010 ====
- In January, Boras negotiated a seven-year, $120 million contract with the St. Louis Cardinals for Matt Holliday. The contract was the largest contract in team history.
- In August, Boras brokered a record five-year, $9.9 million deal for the #1 overall pick in the draft, 17-year-old Bryce Harper, with the Washington Nationals. It marked the second year in a row that Boras and the Nationals had collaborated on a record deal for the top overall pick in the draft. Harper's contract set a new standard for position players in the draft, breaking the previous record held by Boras's deal for Mark Teixeira in 2001. Like fellow Boras client Landon Powell in 2000, Harper earned his GED early in order to enter the draft sooner than would otherwise have been possible.
- Other Boras clients who signed high-profile contracts at the top of the draft included #3 overall pick Manny Machado, #4 overall pick Christian Colon, #7 overall pick Matt Harvey, #24 overall pick Gary Brown, and Anthony Ranaudo.
- On December 5, Boras negotiated a seven-year, $126 million contract for Jayson Werth with the Washington Nationals. The contract tied for the third largest in baseball history for an outfielder, trailing only Manny Ramirez's contract with the Boston Red Sox and Alfonso Soriano's contract with the Chicago Cubs.

==== 2011 ====
- On January 5, Boras finished negotiations on a six-year, $96 million contract for Adrián Beltré with the Texas Rangers, the second major free agent contract of Beltré's career. Beltré previously signed for five years and $64 million with the Mariners, starting with the 2005 season. After that contract finished with an injury year for Beltré, Boras negotiated a one-year, $10 million contract with the Boston Red Sox for 2010 that included a player option for 2011. Boras recommended that Beltré take a short-term deal, calling it a "pillow contract" that gave Beltré a soft landing while he restored his market value. Boras's inclusion of a player option allowed Beltré to play without fear of injury (what Boras called a "calamity scenario"), since at worst Beltré could exercise the option and guarantee himself $5 million for 2011. Beltré proved not to need the insurance, as he was an All-Star for Boston, finishing 9th in AL MVP voting. Following the season Beltré declined the option, which had doubled to $10 million once he hit 640 plate appearances. Beltré and Boras then leveraged the former's rebound season into an additional year and $32 million more from the Rangers than he had received from the Mariners in 2004, even though he entered the Rangers contract six years older.
- On January 11, Boras negotiated a seven-year, $80 million contract extension for Carlos González with the Colorado Rockies. The extension was unusual given that Gonzalez was not eligible for salary arbitration until after the 2012 season and not a free agent until after the 2014 season.
- On January 15, Boras completed a three-year, $35 million contract for Rafael Soriano to pitch for the New York Yankees. The deal was notable for Soriano's right to opt out of the contract following each season, effectively giving Soriano the power to leave the Yankees and seek a larger contract elsewhere without sacrificing the full guaranteed value should he suffer injury or poor performance. Soriano would use this to opt out following the 2012 season.
- On January 18, Boras negotiated a one-year arbitration settlement for Prince Fielder with the Milwaukee Brewers that paid him $15.5 million in 2011, his last year of arbitration eligibility. The settlement was the largest single-season arbitration contract in Major League history, 24% larger than the previous record of $12.5 million, negotiated by Boras for Mark Teixeira in 2008. It also made Fielder the highest-paid player in Brewers history.
- On March 7, former University of Kentucky baseball player James Paxton signed with the Seattle Mariners for $942,500. Paxton had previously sued Kentucky over the NCAA's demand (through the school) that he reveal the contents of his conversations with Boras, an attorney. The issue arose because Toronto Blue Jays President Paul Beeston suggested in a media interview that he had communicated with Boras regarding Paxton. Paxton refused to submit to the interview sought by the NCAA, citing the due process protections in the UK's student code of conduct. Under threat from the NCAA, the school refused to clear Paxton to play. Paxton had previously turned down approximately $874,000 from the Blue Jays before signing with the Mariners.
- On June 6, Gerrit Cole was selected by the Pittsburgh Pirates with the first overall pick in the draft, marking the third consecutive year a player advised by Boras was selected first overall. (Stephen Strasburg was selected #1 in 2009, followed by Bryce Harper in 2010.) On August 15, Boras negotiated an all-time record bonus of $8 million for Cole, surpassing the $7.5 million Boras had negotiated for Strasburg in 2009.
- Also on August 15, Boras negotiated a record contract for Bubba Starling, a high school phenom with a football scholarship to the University of Nebraska–Lincoln, who was selected fifth overall by the Kansas City Royals. Starling received a $7.5 million signing bonus, the second largest in draft history (behind only the bonus Boras negotiated for Cole, and tied with the bonus Boras negotiated for Strasburg). Starling's bonus was also the largest ever for a high school player (surpassing the $6.5 million bonus Boras negotiated for Tate in 2009), and the largest ever for a high school player (surpassing Tate and Harper). His contract also represented the most guaranteed money ever given to a high school player (surpassing Porcello).

==== 2012 ====
- On January 24, Boras secured a nine-year, $214 million contract for Prince Fielder with the Detroit Tigers, the fourth-largest contract ever for a baseball player. The deal surprised many in the industry with its length, its size, and the identity of the signing team, as it had appeared that Boras might be boxed in by a lukewarm market for Fielder.
- On December 10, Boras completed a six-year, $36 million contract for Hyun-Jin Ryu with the Los Angeles Dodgers. Ryu had been pitching for the Hanwha Eagles in Korea, and the Dodgers paid $25.7 million for the exclusive right to sign him. Ryu's contract also contained innings bonuses worth up to $1 million per year and other salary escalators. Ryu could also opt out of the contract if the Dodgers traded him, or after the 2017 season if he had reached 750 career innings pitched.

==== 2013 ====
- In March, Boras secured an eight-year, $120 million extension for Elvis Andrus with the Texas Rangers. The contract covered the 2013–2022 seasons. Andrus would otherwise have been a free agent after the 2014 season. Both Rangers GM Jon Daniels and Boras called the contract "unusual." It contained a vesting option that could raise the value to $135 million over nine years. It also allowed Andrus to opt out following the 2018 and 2019 seasons, when he would be 29 or 30 years old. Andrus also received no-trade protection and award bonuses worth up to $800,000 per year.
- In June, Boras advised four first-round draft picks: Mark Appel, Kris Bryant, Sean Manaea, and Michael Lorenzen.
- Boras negotiated a $6.35 million bonus for Mark Appel, who was selected by the Houston Astros as the #1 overall draft pick. The bonus more than doubled the bonus that Appel had turned down from the Pirates the year before.
- Boras also negotiated the largest bonus received by any player in the draft ($6,708.400). That amount was received by Kris Bryant, who was selected #2 by the Cubs.
- On December 3, Boras negotiated a seven-year, $153 million contract for Red Sox center fielder Jacoby Ellsbury to join the rival New York Yankees. An option year could raise the total value to $169 million over eight years. The Red Sox had offered Ellsbury a below-market $100 million contract and were outbid by the Yankees in an echo of Johnny Damon's 2005 deal. Both were top-of-the-order outfielders represented by Boras, fresh off a championship with Boston. Mainstream media described the deal as a "monster" and "brain-melting."
- On December 21, Boras completed a seven-year, $130 million contract for free agent Shin-Soo Choo with the Texas Rangers. Choo became the first player without an All-Star appearance to sign a contract worth $100 million or more.

==== 2014 ====
- Two Boras free agent clients, Stephen Drew and Kendrys Morales, did not sign until late May and early June respectively. Both players were subject to draft pick compensation under MLB rules, dampening their market. Boras criticized the compensation rules, while the MLBPA launched an investigation into team conduct. The rules, which Boras dismissed as "corrupt" the previous winter, also hurt the market for players Boras did not represent, like Nelson Cruz, Ubaldo Jiménez, and Ervin Santana. All three signed one-year deals before the start of the 2014 regular season. That meant all three were again exposed to the draft pick compensation rules following the 2014 season. By waiting to sign, Drew and Morales avoided any draft pick compensation following the 2014 season.
- Boras negotiated the largest bonus of any player in the draft for Carlos Rodón, who received $6.582 million from the Chicago White Sox as the #3 selection in the draft.

==== 2015 ====
- On January 19, Boras negotiated a 7-year, $210 million contract with the Washington Nationals for free agent Max Scherzer, who turned down at least $144 million from the Detroit Tigers before the 2014 season. Boras helped Scherzer secure insurance against an injury suffered before free agency.

==== 2016 ====
- On January 5, Boras secured a seven year, $161 million deal for his client Chris Davis to return to the Baltimore Orioles. As of February 2026, the contract is the richest free agent deal given out by the club. Five years after the signing the contract in August 2021, Davis, dealing with injuries and a massive decline in performance, would retire from the sport after both sides agreed to restructure the deal to defer his payment through 2037.
- On January 7, Boras client Denard Span would agree to a three year, $31 million deal with the San Francisco Giants. The contract included a team option for 2019, which was declined following his stint with the Seattle Mariners via a trade, and Span would ultimately retire in 2020.
- On May 9, Boras secured a seven-year, $175 million deal extension with Stephen Strasburg and the Washington Nationals. Strasburg would have been a free agent following the 2016 season. The contract included a player option after the 2019 season that Strasburg would exercise following his MVP performance in the 2019 World Series.

==== 2018 ====
- On February 17, Boras secured an 8-year, $144 million dollar deal for first baseman Eric Hosmer to join the San Diego Padres. The deal was at that time the largest contract in franchise history until Manny Machado shattered it the next year. Hosmer's deal was back-loaded and had a full no-trade clause for the first three seasons followed by limited trade protection afterwards.
- On February 25, Boras and the Boston Red Sox finalized a 5-year, $110 million dollar deal for designated hitter J.D. Martinez. The deal was heavily front-loaded and had multiple opt-out clauses.
- On March 11, 2015 NL Cy Young Award winner Jake Arrieta signed a 3-year, $75 million contract extension with the Philadelphia Phillies. The deal was also front-loaded and included a player option after the 2019 season. The Phillies also had an option to void Arrieta's opt-out clause by giving Arrieta a two-year extension starting at $20 million/year.
- On March 19, reigning AL MVP and second baseman Jose Altuve signed a 5-year, $151 million contract extension with the Houston Astros. The deal was the largest in team history and included a full no-trade clause.

==== 2019 ====
- On February 28, Boras negotiated a then-MLB-record 13-year, $330 million contract with the Philadelphia Phillies for free agent Bryce Harper. This contract was not only significant for its record-breaking value, but also its inclusion of a no-trade clause and the absence of any opt-out clauses. Nineteen days later, Mike Trout's contract extension broke the record set by Harper's contract.
- On April 1, Boras negotiated a 6-year, $120 million contract extension for shortstop Xander Bogaerts with the Boston Red Sox. Bogaerts would previously have been a free agent following the 2019 season. The deal included a player option after the 2022 season, which Bogaerts did use.
- On December 9, Boras negotiated what was at the time the largest contact for a pitcher in both total value and average annual value at $245 million over 7 years with the Washington Nationals for free agent Stephen Strasburg. The contract beat out David Price's $217 million contract in total value and Zack Greinke's $31.5 million per year contract in average annual value. The contract had a full no-trade clause and $80 million in deferred payments to be paid by 2029.
- On December 10, Boras once again set records when he landed free agent Gerrit Cole a contract with the New York Yankees worth $324 million over 9 years. This contract became the largest ever given to a pitcher in terms of total salary and average annual value, beating out Stephen Strasburg at $36 million/year. It also became the fourth largest contract in MLB history. The contract includes a full no-trade clause as well as a player option after the 2024 season. Cole initially attempted to exercise the opt-out clause, but decided to stay under the original contract after having discussions with the team.
- On December 11, Boras signed free agent third baseman Anthony Rendon to a 7-year, $245 million contract with the Los Angeles Angels. After the conclusion of the 2025 season, the Angels and Rendon agreed to a restructuring of his contract, marking an end to his tenure with the team. Rendon would receive the remaining $38 million of his contract in deferred payments over the following three to five years.
- On December 27, left-handed Korean starting pitcher Hyun-jin Ryu signed a 4-year, $80 million contract with the Toronto Blue Jays. With this signing, Boras's clients had signed contracts totaling more than $1 billion ($1,013,500,000) in December.

=== 2020s ===
==== 2021 ====
- On November 28, Boras client Marcus Semien agreed to a 7-year, $175 million contract with the Texas Rangers.
- On November 29, Boras client Max Scherzer agreed to a 3-year, $130 million contract with the New York Mets with an opt-out after 2023.
- On November 29, Boras client Corey Seager agreed to a 10-year, $325 million contract with the Texas Rangers.

==== 2022 ====
- On March 16, Boras client Kris Bryant agreed to a 7-year, $182 million contract with the Colorado Rockies.
- On March 18, Boras client Carlos Correa agreed to a 3-year, $105.3 million contract with the Minnesota Twins with opt-outs after 2022 and 2023.
- On December 7, Boras client Xander Bogaerts agreed to an 11-year, $280 million contract with the San Diego Padres.
- On December 8, Boras client Brandon Nimmo agreed to an 8-year, $162 million contract with the New York Mets.
- On December 15, Boras client Carlos Rodón agreed to a 6-year, $162 million contract with the New York Yankees.
- On December 16, Boras client Taijuan Walker agreed to a 4-year, $72 million contract with the Philadelphia Phillies.

==== 2023 ====
- On January 10, Boras client Carlos Correa agreed to a six-year, $200 million contract with the Minnesota Twins. The deal includes front-loaded vesting options ($25 million in 2029 to $10 million in 2032). Boras had previously secured a 13-year, $350 million dollar deal with the San Francisco Giants, but the deal fell through when the Giants discovered an ankle issue in Correa's medical reports. Boras then secured a 12-year, $315 million dollar deal with the New York Mets. However, the Mets too backed out of the deal after discovering the same ankle issues.
- On December 12, Boras client Jung-hoo Lee agreed to a six-year, $113 million contract with the San Francisco Giants with an opt-out after 2027. Lee's posting fee was $18.825 million.

==== 2024 ====
- On January 11, Boras client Juan Soto avoided salary arbitration by agreeing to a one-year, $31 million deal with the New York Yankees. The deal was the highest for an arbitration-eligible player, beating out Shohei Ohtani's one-year $30 million deal, until Tarik Skubal broke it in 2026.
- On February 25, Boras client Cody Bellinger agreed to a three-year, $80 million contract to return to the Chicago Cubs. The deal included an opt-out after 2024 and 2025. Bellinger was coming off a successful 2023 season where he won the NL Comeback Player of the Year following 2 down years with the Dodgers, and had had to settle for a one-year deal with Chicago before 2023.
- On March 3, Boras client Matt Chapman agreed to a one-year, $18 million contract with the San Francisco Giants. The deal included two player options for 2025 and 2026. It was considered surprisingly small for a player of Chapman's caliber, but came towards the end of a slow free agency process and against the backdrop of a qualifying offer attached to Chapman.
- On March 29, Boras client Jordan Montgomery agreed to a one-year, $25 million contract with the Arizona Diamondbacks that included a vesting option for 2025; an option Montgomery would exercise. However on April 11, Montgomery fired Boras after stating that Boras had "butchered" his free agency. Montgomery would not make his season debut until April 19th, following getting reps in Triple A.
- On September 4, Boras client Chapman agreed to a six-year, $151 million contract extension with the San Francisco Giants. The deal came shortly before his original one-year contract would have run out.
- On November 26, Boras client Blake Snell agreed to a five-year, $182 million contract with the Los Angeles Dodgers. The deal includes a club option for a sixth year at $10 million if Snell is on the IL longer than 90 days for a specific injury and is not traded. This contract comes after Snell opted out of a two-year, $62 million deal with the San Francisco Giants.
- On December 8, Boras client Juan Soto agreed to a fifteen-year, $765 million contract with the New York Mets. The contract includes a player option after the 2029 season, but the Mets can void that option by raising Soto's AAV from $51 million to $55 million, which would take the contract value up to $805 million. As of February 2026, the contract is the largest in the history of professional sports.
- On December 27, Boras client Corbin Burnes agreed to a six-year, $210 million contract with the Arizona Diamondbacks with an opt-out after 2026.

==== 2025 ====
- On February 15, Boras client Alex Bregman signed a three-year, $120 million contract with the Boston Red Sox. The deal included a player option after both the 2025 and 2026 seasons. Bregman exercised the option after the 2025 season.
- On December 2, Boras client Dylan Cease signed a club record seven-year, $210 million contract with the Toronto Blue Jays. The deal shattered the club's previous biggest free agent signing, a six-year, $150 million deal with George Springer. The deal includes an 8-team no-trade list, $64 million in deferred money from 2033-2043, and performance incentives.
- On December 10, Boras client Pete Alonso signed a five-year, $155 million contract with the Baltimore Orioles. The deal came months after Alonso had opted out of the two-year, $54 million deal he had signed to return to the New York Mets the previous winter. The deal does not include any opt-outs, has an eight-team no-trade clause, and is the second largest deal given by the Orioles, trailing only Chris Davis' 2016 $161 million deal.

==== 2026 ====
- On January 5, Boras client Tatsuya Imai signed a three-year, $54 million contract with the Houston Astros. The deal includes player opt-outs after the 2026 and 2027 seasons. Imai was posted by his former club, the Saitama Seibu Lions, and the Astros paid them nearly $10 million to get him.
- On January 14, Boras client Alex Bregman signed a five-year, $175 million contract with the Chicago Cubs. The AAV of $35 million is the highest in Cubs history. The contract also includes $70 million in deferred money as well as a no-trade clause, and is the third highest total in club history behind the $184 million deal signed by Jason Heyward and $177 million deal signed by Dansby Swanson.
- On January 21, Boras client Ranger Suarez signed a five-year, $130 million contract with the Boston Red Sox. The deal is heavily back-loaded and includes a mutual option in 2031 for $35 million. Should the option be declined, Suarez will receive a $10 million buyout. This deal came one week after the Red Sox had allowed Alex Bregman to opt out and leave in free agency.
- On January 26, Boras client Cody Bellinger signed a five-year, $162.5 million contract deal to return to the New York Yankees. Bellinger had opted out of his previous contract with the team on November 3, 2025. The deal includes opt-outs after the 2027 and 2028 seasons as well as a full no-trade clause.
- On February 5, Boras and his client Tarik Skubal, the reigning back-to-back AL Cy Young Award winner, won their salary arbitration case against the Detroit Tigers. The Tigers offered him $19 million, but the arbitration panel sided with Skubal and awarded him a $32 million contract. The $32 million deal is not only the highest for a player eligible for arbitration, it shattered David Price's $19.75 million pitcher arbitration record from 2015 (equivalent to roughly $26.8 million in 2025).

== Personal life ==
Scott and his wife Jeanette Boras have been together since 1982 and married since 1985. They have three children.

As part of the Boras Family Foundation charity, Boras has hosted an annual baseball tournament since 2013 called the Boras Baseball Classic. Originally made up of baseball teams from California and since 2017 including teams from Arizona, the tournament is a bracketed competition of elite high school teams, in which the athletes may showcase their skill to collegiate coaches and MLB scouts. As of 2025, the tournament has included over 5,000 Division l athletes and over 500 MLB draftees, including #1 overall draft picks Paul Skenes (2023), Spencer Torkelson (2020), Royce Lewis (2017), and Mickey Moniak (2016).
