= List of Golden State Warriors head coaches =

The Golden State Warriors are an American professional basketball team based in San Francisco, California. The franchise had been known as the Philadelphia Warriors and the San Francisco Warriors, due to it previously being based in or near those cities. The team is a member of the Pacific Division of the Western Conference in the National Basketball Association (NBA). The Warriors initially joined the Basketball Association of America (BAA) as the Philadelphia Warriors in 1946, and won the first BAA championship title in the same year under coach Eddie Gottlieb. The Warriors later joined the NBA at its foundation in 1949. The Warriors' record was 26–42 in their first NBA season and lost in the first round of the playoffs to the Syracuse Nationals. Franklin Mieuli and the Diners Club put together a group of 40 local investors to move the Warriors to San Francisco before the 1962–63 NBA season, with Mieuli eventually buying all the shares of the franchise to keep the team from collapsing and to keep it in the area. The team became the Golden State Warriors and moved to Oakland before the 1971–72 NBA season.

There have been 25 head coaches for the Warriors franchise. The franchise won their first NBA championship as the Philadelphia Warriors in the 1956 NBA Finals, and were coached by George Senesky. Their second title was won as the Golden State Warriors in 1975, under coach Al Attles, who played with and coached the Warriors for 25 seasons. He was also the franchise's all-time leader in regular season games coached and wins until March 2025 when his record was surpassed by Steve Kerr, who coached the Warriors to four championships in 2015, 2017, 2018 and 2022. Kerr also leads the franchise in winning percentage for games coached, as well as playoff games coached and wins.

Frank McGuire is one of the members of the franchise that has been inducted into the Basketball Hall of Fame as coaches, while being the only one to do so that has spent his whole career with the franchise. Alex Hannum, Don Nelson, and Bill Sharman are the only other members of the franchise that have been inducted into the Hall of Fame. Hannum, Nelson, and Kerr have both received the NBA Coach of the Year award once. Nelson has also been named one of the top 10 coaches in NBA history. Four former players for the Warriors, Attles, Johnston, George Lee, and Senesky went on to coach for the franchise.

== Key ==
GC	Games coached
W	Wins
L	Losses
Win%	Winning percentage
#	Number of coaches^{[a]}
†	Elected to the Basketball Hall of Fame as a coach
*	Spent entire NBA head coaching career with the Warriors
*†	Elected to the Basketball Hall of Fame as a coach and spent entire NBA head coaching career with the Warriors

== Coaches ==
Note: Statistics are correct through the end of the 2025–26 season.

#	Name	Term^{[b]}	GC	W	L	Win%	GC	W	L	Win%	Achievements	Reference
#	Name	Term^{[b]}	Regular season				Playoffs				Achievements	Reference
Philadelphia Warriors
1	Eddie Gottlieb*	1946–1955	581	263	318	.453	32	15	17	.469	1 Championship (1947)	
2	George Senesky*	1955–1958	216	119	97	.551	20	10	10	.500	1 Championship (1956)	
3	Al Cervi	1958–1959	72	32	40	.444	—	—	—	—		
4	Neil Johnston*	1959–1961	154	95	59	.617	12	4	8	.333		
5	Frank McGuire*†	1961–1962	80	49	31	.613	12	6	6	.500		
San Francisco Warriors
6	Bob Feerick	1962–1963	80	31	49	.388	—	—	—	—		
7	Alex Hannum†	1963–1966	240	100	140	.417	12	5	7	.417	1963–64 NBA Coach of the Year	
8	Bill Sharman†	1966–1968	163	87	76	.534	25	13	12	.520		
9	George Lee*	1968–1970	134	63	71	.470	6	2	4	.333		
10	Al Attles*	1970–1971 (as player-coach)	122	49	63	.438	5	1	4	.200		
Golden State Warriors
—	Al Attles*	1971–1980	707	394	323	.550	56	29	27	.518	1 Championship (1975)	
11	Johnny Bach*	1980	21	6	15	.286	—	—	—	—		
—	Al Attles*	1980–1983	246	114	132	.463	—	—	—	—		
—	Johnny Bach*	1983–1986	246	89	157	.362	—	—	—	—		
12	George Karl†	1986–1988	146	58	88	.397	10	4	6	.400		
13	Ed Gregory*	1988	18	4	14	.222	—	—	—	—		
14	Don Nelson†	1988–1995	537	277	260	.516	24	9	15	.375	1991–92 NBA Coach of the Year; One of the top 10 coaches in NBA history	
15	Bob Lanier*	1995	37	12	25	.324	—	—	—	—		
16	Rick Adelman†	1995–1997	164	66	98	.402	—	—	—	—		
17	P.J. Carlesimo	1997–1999	159	46	113	.289	—	—	—	—		
18	Garry St. Jean	1999–2000	55	13	42	.236	—	—	—	—		
19	Dave Cowens	2000–2001	105	25	80	.238	—	—	—	—		
20	Brian Winters	2001–2002	59	13	46	.220	—	—	—	—		
21	Eric Musselman	2002–2004	164	75	89	.457	—	—	—	—		
22	Mike Montgomery*	2004–2006	164	68	96	.415	—	—	—	—		
—	Don Nelson†	2006–2010	328	145	183	.442	11	5	6	.455	One of the top 10 coaches in NBA history	
23	Keith Smart	2010–2011	82	36	46	.439	—	—	—	—		
24	Mark Jackson*	2011–2014	230	121	109	.526	19	9	10	.474		
25	Steve Kerr*	2014–present	957	604	353	.631	152	104	48	.684	4 Championships (2015, 2017, 2018, 2022); 2015–16 NBA Coach of the Year	

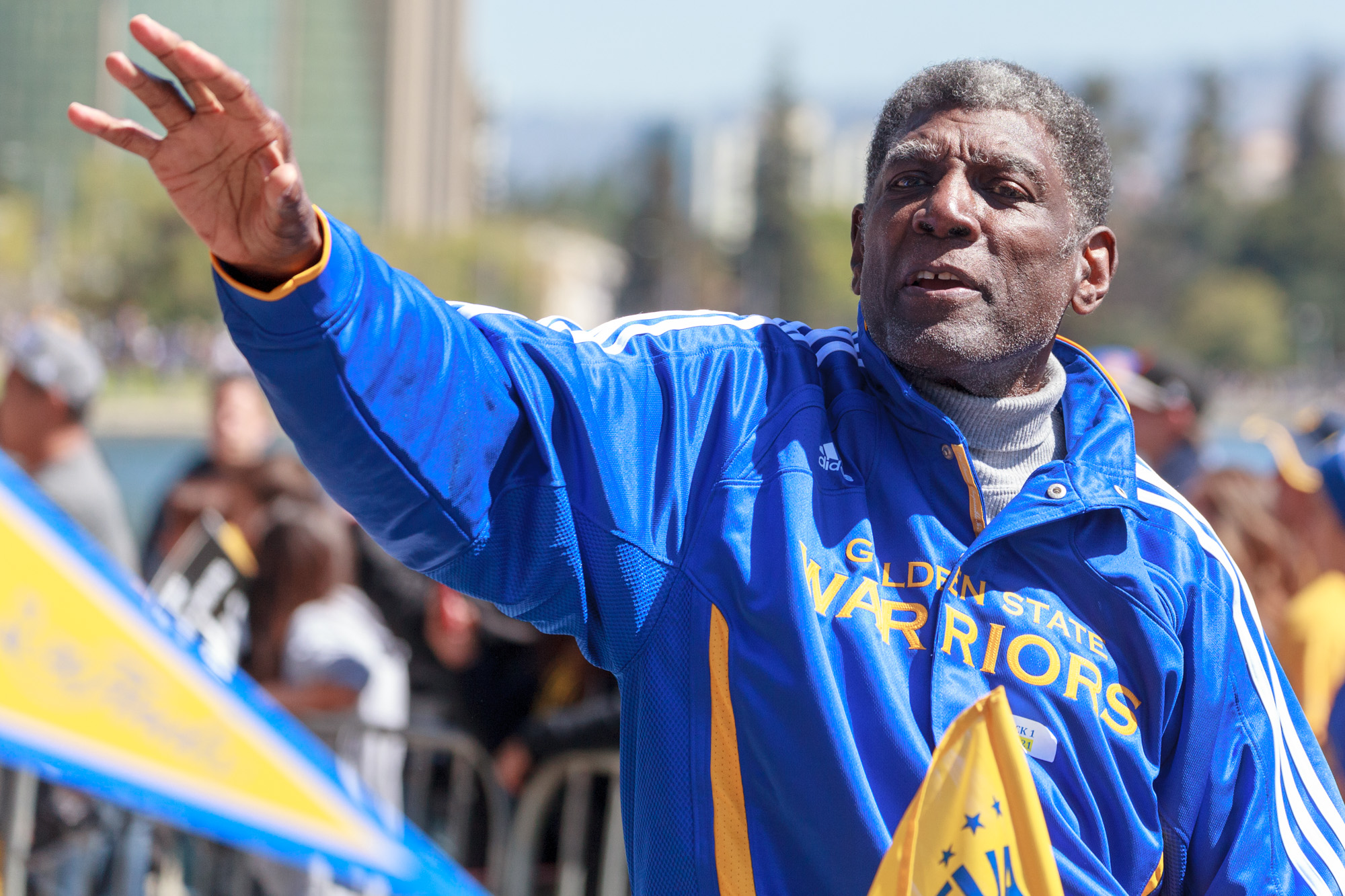
Al Attles was the head coach from 1970 to 1983 and guided the Rick Barry-led Warriors to the 1975 NBA championship.

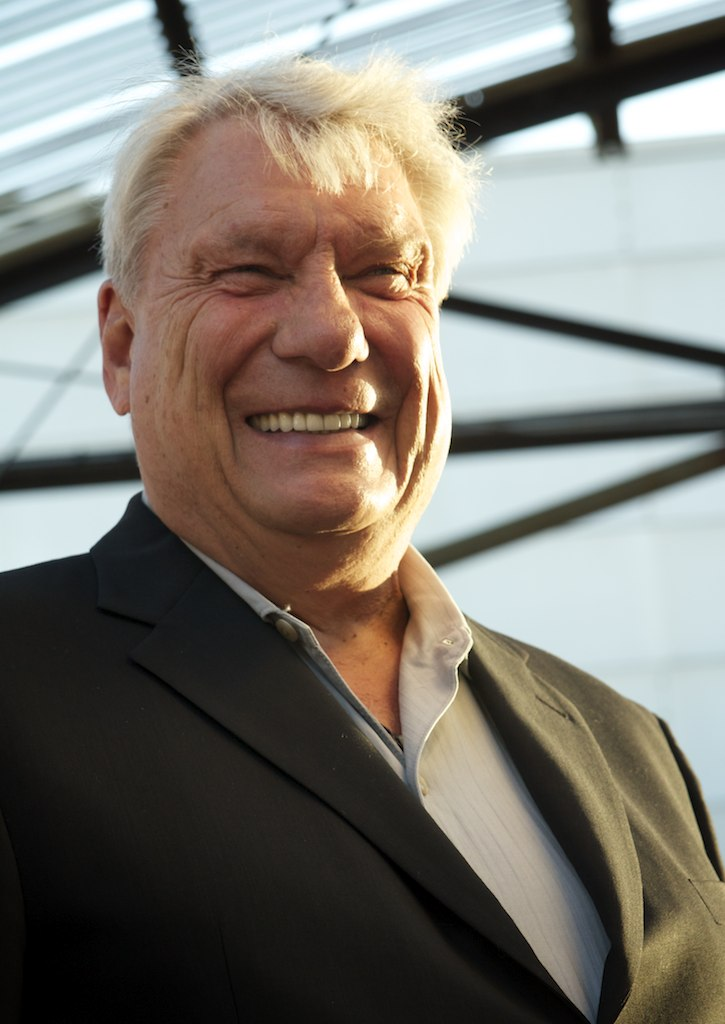
Don Nelson was the Golden State Warriors head coach from 1988 to 1995 and from 2006 to 2010.

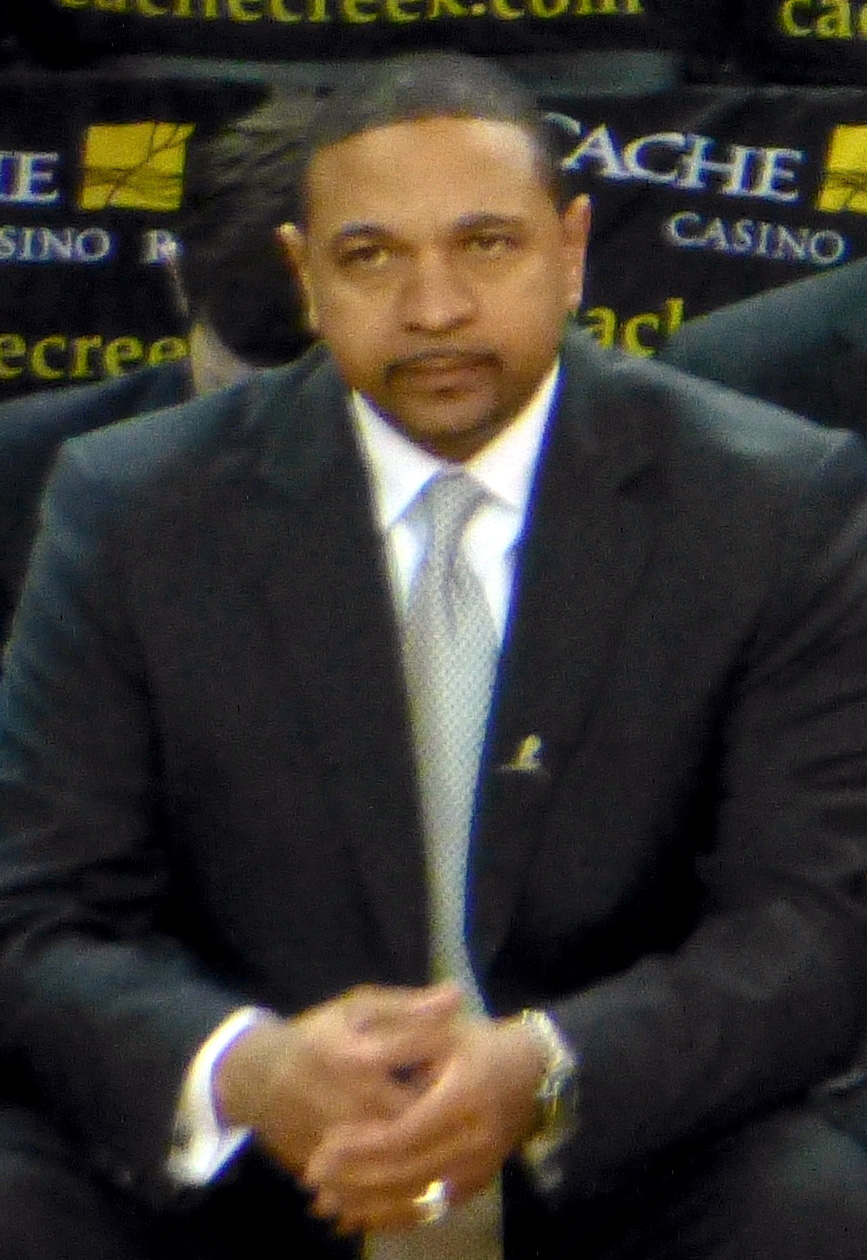
Mark Jackson was the head coach from 2011 to 2014.

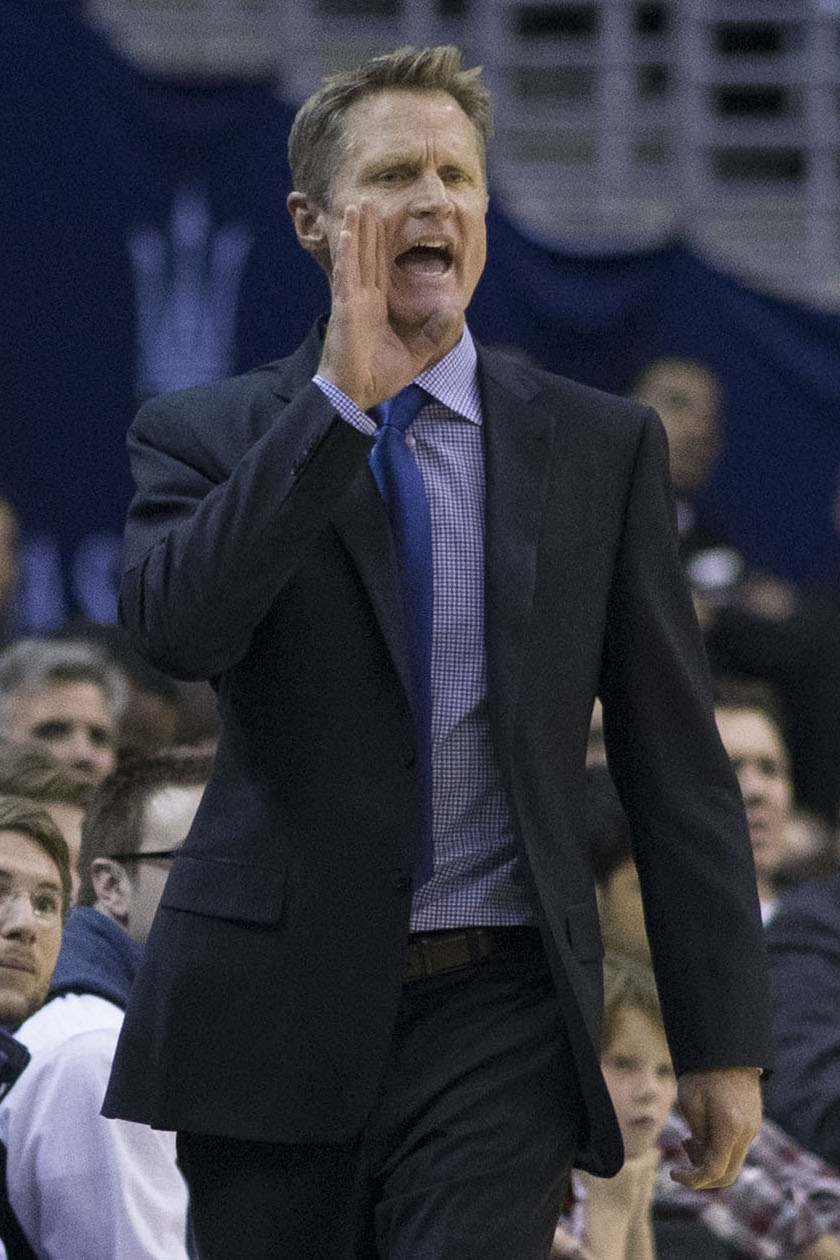
Steve Kerr is the current head coach of the Warriors since the 2014–15 season.

== Notes ==
- ^{a} A running total of the number of coaches of the Warriors. Thus, any coach who has two separate terms as head coach is only counted once.
- ^{b} Each year is linked to an article about that particular NBA season.
