= List of Oakland, California middle schools =

This is a list of current public middle schools in Oakland, California, including charter schools.

== Schools administered by the Oakland Unified School District ==
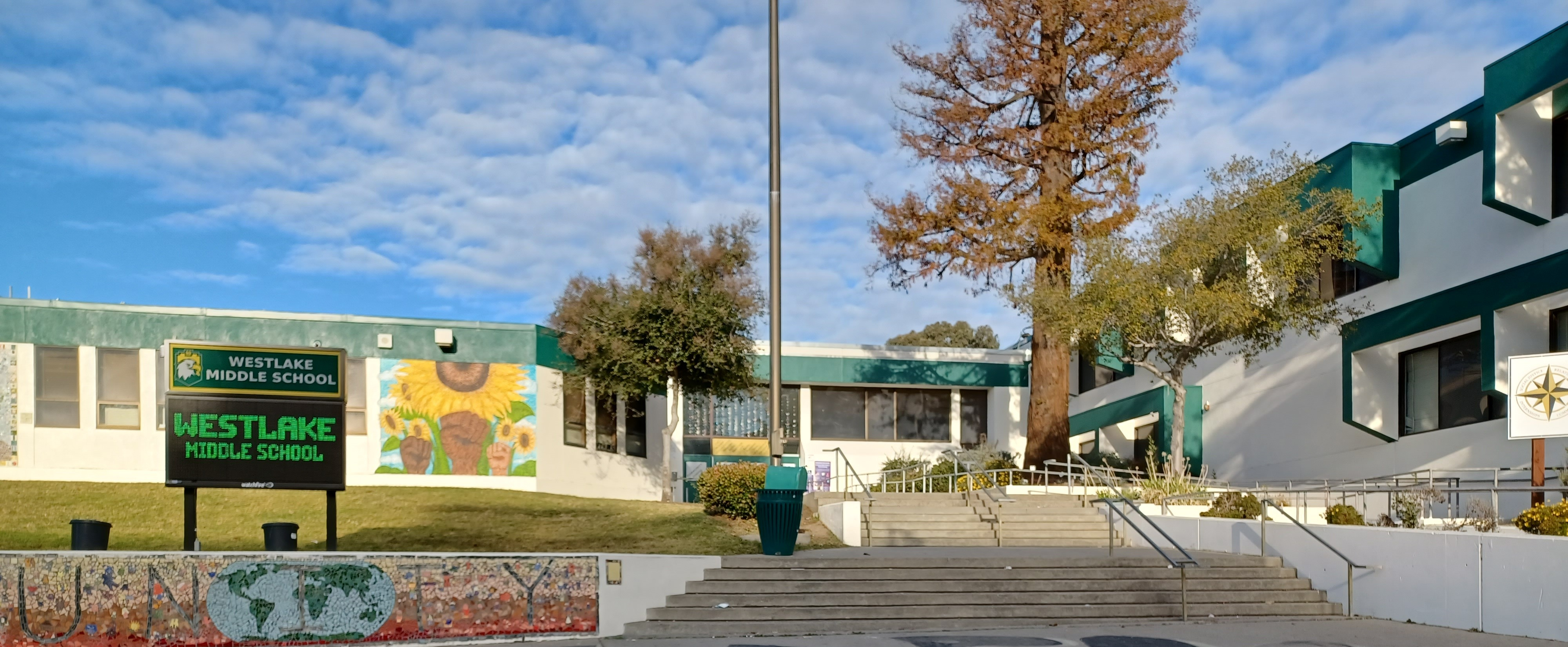
Westlake Middle School

- Alliance Academy
- Bret Harte Middle School (established 1930)
- Claremont Middle School
- Coliseum College Prep Academy (6-12)
- Edna M. Brewer Middle School
- Elmhurst Community Prep
- Frick Middle School
- Madison Park Academy
- Melrose Leadership Academy
- Montera Middle School
- Roosevelt Middle School (formerly Roosevelt High School)
- ROOTS International Academy
- United for Success Academy
- West Oakland Middle School
- Westlake Middle School

== Charter schools ==
- American Indian Public Charter School
- Ascend Middle School (TK-8)
- Bay Area Technology School or BayTech (6-12)
- East Bay Innovation Academy (6-12)
- KIPP Bridge College Prep
- Life Academy (6-12)
- Oakland Charter Academy
- Oakland School for the Arts (6-12)
- Urban Promise Academy

== Closed schools ==
- Barack Obama Academy - closed 2012
- Calvin Simmons Middle School (formerly Alexander Hamilton Junior High) - closed 2007
- Cole Middle School - closed 2009
- Community Day Middle School - closed 2022
- Explore Middle School - closed 2010
- KIZMET Academy (formerly Lowell Middle School)- closed 2007
- La Escuelita Middle School - closed 2022
- Parker Middle School - closed 2022
- Peralta Creek Middle School - closed 2009
- Verdese Carter Middle School campus of Oakland International High School (formerly Woodrow Wilson Junior High) - closed 2006

== See also ==
- List of Oakland, California elementary schools
- List of Oakland, California high schools
