= List of Oakland, California elementary schools =

This is a list of Oakland, California elementary schools. The list includes current and former schools, public, and charter. Oakland's public elementary schools are part of the Oakland Unified School District.

== District-run public schools ==
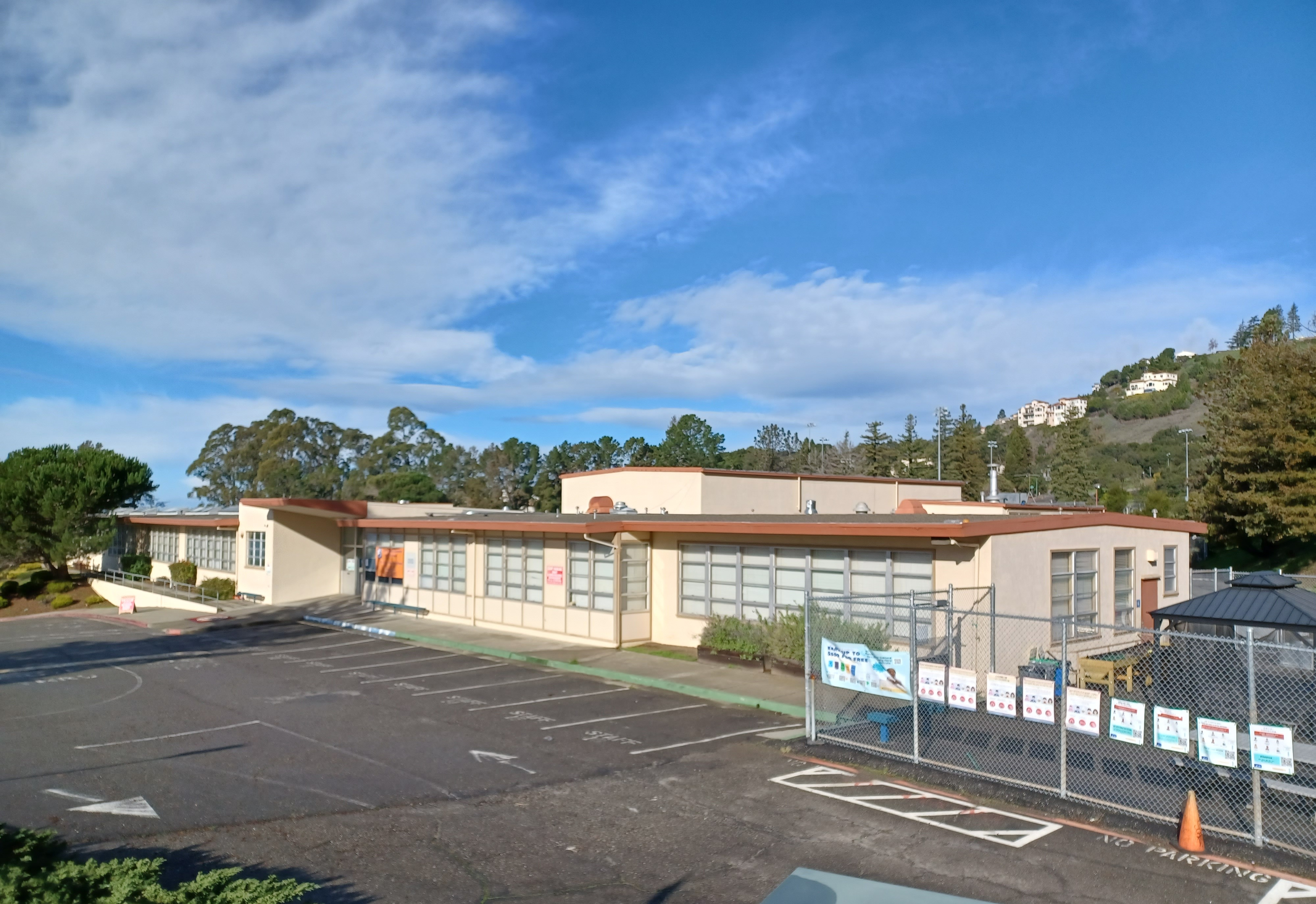
Carl B. Munck Elementary School

- Acorn Woodland Elementary School
- Allendale Elementary School
- Bella Vista Elementary School
- Bridges Academy
- Brookfield Elementary School
- Burckhalter Elementary School
- Carl B. Munck Elementary School
- Chabot Elementary School
- Cleveland Elementary School
- Crocker Highlands Elementary School
- East Oakland Pride Elementary School
- Emerson Elementary School
- Encompass Academy
- Esperanza Elementary School
- Franklin Elementary School
- Fred T. Korematsu Discovery Academy
- Fruitvale Elementary School
- Garfield Elementary School
- Glenview Elementary School
- Global Family School
- Grass Valley Elementary School
- Greenleaf Elementary School
- Hillcrest Elementary School
- Hoover Elementary School
- Horace Mann Elementary School
- (Charles P.) Howard Elementary School
- International Community School
- Joaquin Miller Elementary School
- La Escuelita Elementary School
- Lafayette Elementary School
- Laurel Elementary School
- Lincoln Elementary School
- Lockwood STEAM Academy
- Madison Park Academy Primary
- Manzanita Community School
- Manzanita Seed
- Markham Elementary School
- Martin Luther King, Jr. Elementary School
- Melrose Leadership Academy
- Montclair Elementary
- New Highland Academy
- Peralta Elementary School
- Piedmont Avenue Elementary School
- Prescott School
- Reach Academy
- Redwood Heights Elementary School
- Rise Community School
- Sankofa United
- Sequoia Elementary School
- Sobrante Park Elementary School
- Think College Now Elementary School
- Thornhill Elementary School

== Charter schools ==
- Achieve Academy – Education for Change
- American Indian Public Charter School II
- ASCEND Charter School
- Aspire Berkley Maynard Academy
- Aspire College Academy
- Aspire ERES Academy
- Aspire Monarch Academy
- Aspire Triumph Technology Academy
- Community School for Creative Education
- Cox Academy – Education for Change
- Francophone Charter School of Oakland
- KIPP Bridge Academy
- Lazear Charter Academy
- Learning Without Limits Charter School
- Lighthouse Community Charter School
- Lodestar: A Lighthouse Community Public School
- North Oakland Community Charter School
- Roses in Concrete
- Urban Montessori Charter School
- Vincent Academy
- Yu Ming Charter School

== Child development centers ==
- Webster Academy

== Closed schools ==
- Community Day Elementary School
- Futures Elementary School
- Jefferson Elementary
- Kaiser Elementary
- Lakeview
- Lazear
- Marshall
- Maxwell Park Elementary School
- Parker K-8
- Santa Fe
- Tilden Elementary School
- Washington Elementary School (now Sankofa Academy)

== See also ==
- List of Oakland, California middle schools
- List of Oakland, California high schools
