= University Preparatory Charter Academy =

Defunct charter school in California, United States

Information
- School type: Charter high school
- Established: 2001
- Founder: Isaac Haqq
- Closed: 2007
- School district: Oakland Unified School District
- Enrollment: 260 (2004)

University Preparatory Charter Academy, also known as "U-prep" or "UPREP", was a charter high school in the Oakland Unified School District, California. It was founded in 2001 by Isaac Haqq in the Eastmont Town Center at the corner of 72nd Street and Bancroft Ave. In its first year of operation, the school had about 80 students and taught a ninth grade curriculum, expanding in number of students and grade levels taught each year. The school doubled in size from some 130 to 260 students in 2004.

Haqq claimed "We have made it cool to be smart at this school".

A large portion of the student body were minorities; 78% were African American, and 15% were Hispanic.

In 2007 the school district nullified the school's 2006 exam results after discovering that someone had changed hundreds of test core answers from wrong to right. The district threatened to revoke the school's charter after scandals involving alleged cheating by an adult student and alleged grade changes by teachers. State investigators seized copies of the 2005 standardized tests, which were being illegally used to prepare UPREP students for the 2007 exams.

According to former teachers and a former director of the school's independent study program, school officials sent poor performing students home on testing days or temporarily assigned them to 12th grade, where testing was not required. This had the effect of artificially raising the school's average test score.

Former teachers of the school documented multiple cases where course names and grades were falsified on transcripts sent to universities.

The founder, Isaac Haqq, resigned from his directorship on July 12. At a board meeting to discuss the future of the school, parents praised the school's achievements and opposed its closure.

The governing board of UPREP voted to close the school in July 2007 after allegations of fraudulent attendance reporting (creating fraudulent collection of state funding estimated at $260,000). In addition the State Department of Education invalidated the school's test scores in 2006 and announced its intention to invalidate the results for 2007, in both cases because of cheating.

On August 2, 2007, the San Francisco Chronicle reported that the school had been closed and the district was scrambling to find placement for its students.

The CDS Code for UPREP is 01612590130591.

== See also ==
- List of high schools in California
