= KIPP King Collegiate High School =

High school in California, United States

Coordinates: 37.6745°N 122.1504°W

Information
- School type: Charter school
- Established: 2007; 19 years ago

KIPP King Collegiate High School is a free, public charter school located in San Lorenzo, California. Founded in 2007, KIPP King was named after Martin Luther King Jr.
