= Josh Garrett =

Athlete and hiker

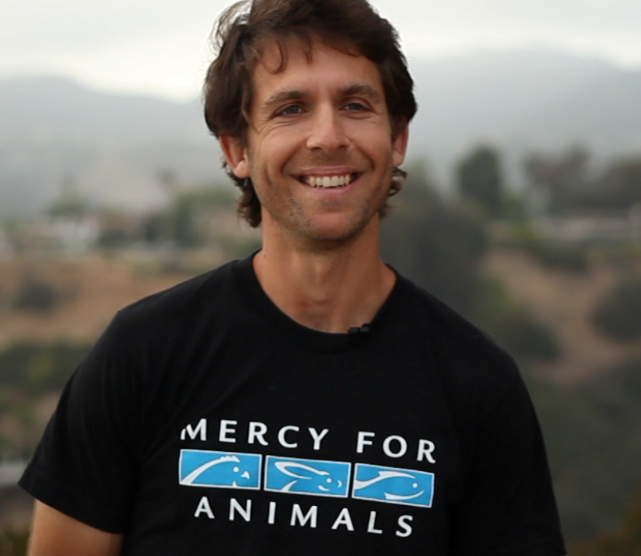
Josh Garrett

Josh Garrett (born 1982) is an American endurance athlete, vegan activist, and actor. In 2013 he set a world record for the overall fastest known time for a thru hike of the Pacific Crest Trail, which traverses the American Cordillera of the United States from Campo, at the Mexican border, to Manning Park in British Columbia. He started acting in 2025, cast in the multi-award winning independent feature film, The Strawberry, as the son of the lead character played by Mike Farrell (M*A*S*H).

== Life ==
Garrett was born in Los Angeles in 1982. He attended and competed for Santa Monica College in 2001, placing in the state's top 10 for the 1500-meter run. He has a Master's Degree in Exercise Science from Long Beach State University. During the year of his record-breaking hike he worked as an exercise physiology teacher and cross country coach at Santa Monica College. He went on to lecture in kinesiology and nutrition at California State University Los Angeles. He sits on the board of the animal advocacy nonprofit organization, DawnWatch.

== Record time ==
In 2013 Garrett broke the record for the overall fastest known time for a thru hike of the Pacific Crest Trail, which traverses the West Coast of the United States from Campo, at the Mexican border, to Manning Park in British Columbia. Garrett started the 2663 mile hike on June 10, 2013, and finished on August 8, achieving the record with a time of 59 days, 8 hours and 14 minutes, averaging 45 miles per day. He was the first person to hike the trail in under 60 days. He held the record for the fastest known time until August 10, 2014.

Garrett hiked to raise money for the charity group Mercy for Animals, his hike being described in the press as a "mission" for the animals. In media interviews about his record Garrett spoke mostly about his cause. He told National Public Radio, "We don’t need to eat meat or any animal products in order to be healthy or in order to be strong, and I just wanted to go out there and prove that -- and I hope I did.” When the Los Angeles radio station, KNX, named Garrett their "hero of the week," Garrett said in the segment, "I did it to raise awareness that this sort of feat of endurance could be powered by a vegan diet… No matter how hard it was I just kept reminding myself that what I was going through was nothing compared to what animals are going through on factory farms."
