= Matt White (minor league pitcher) =

American baseball player (born 1978)

- Pitcher
- Born: August 13, 1978 (age 48); Waynesboro, Pennsylvania, U.S.
- Bats: Right Throws: Right
- Stats at Baseball Reference

Career highlights and awards
- Gatorade High School Baseball Player of the Year (1996)
Medals
Men's baseball
Representing United States
World Junior Baseball Championship
| Bronze medal – third place | 1996 Sancti Spíritus | Team |

Matthew Edward White (born August 13, 1978) is an American former professional baseball pitcher.

== Career ==
White attended Waynesboro Area High School from 1993 to 1996 where he played four varsity sports and had a 0.79 earned run average as a baseball player. During his senior year he posted a 10–1 record with an 0.63 ERA, allowing 21 hits and 37 baserunners. Following the season he was named the high school baseball player of the year by USA Today, Baseball America, the National High School Baseball Coaches Association and Gatorade.

After initially planning to attend Georgia Tech, White was drafted by the San Francisco Giants in the 1996 amateur draft, but his agent Scott Boras found a long-ignored provision in MLB's Collective Bargaining Agreement that allowed White to become a free agent after the Giants failed to offer him a written contract in the required 15-day time allotted. He received a $10.2 million signing bonus (equivalent to $20.9 million in 2025) in 1996 with the Tampa Bay Devil Rays. It was the largest bonus ever given to an amateur player.

Before even making his professional debut with the Hudson Valley Renegades in 1997, Baseball America ranked him the sixth-best prospect in baseball. Shoulder and back injuries limited White to 122 minor league games during his career. He never played in the major leagues and retired in 2006 with a career mark of 35–47 and a 4.64 earned run average.

White was the only high school player invited to try out for the United States national baseball team for the 1996 Summer Olympics but was the last player cut from the team. He was selected to the 2000 Sydney Olympic team but suffered an injury prior to the games and was forced to return without participating.
