= Bay Area Technology School =

Charter high school in California, United States

Coordinates: 37.765411°N 122.154237°W

- Oakland, California; United States

Information
- Type: Tech school
- Established: 2004; 22 years ago
- Grades: 6-12

The Bay Area Technology School (BayTech) is a charter school located in Oakland, California, United States. BayTech is a college prep middle and high school which serves 6th through 12th grade students from the East Bay Region. The school was established in 2004 by Willow Education Foundation.

In 2018, BayTech was under investigation for fraud by the Oakland Unified School District, when several senior staff, board members, and its principal abruptly resigned from their positions. The school has been linked to the Gulen movement by local press.
