= Life Academy of Health and Bioscience =

Location
- 2101 35th Ave, Oakland CA; Oakland, California; USA

Information
- Type: Public secondary
- Established: 2001
- School district: Oakland Unified School District
- Teaching staff: 30.22 (FTE)
- Grades: 6-12
- Enrollment: 441 (2023-2024)
- Student to teacher ratio: 14.59
- Campus: Urban
- Website: lifeacademy.ousd.org

Life Academy of Health and Bioscience, is an urban public high school located in Oakland, California.
