= Unity High School (Oakland, California) =

Charter high school in California, United States

Coordinates: 37°46′24.17″N 122°11′5.45″W

- Oakland, California; United States

Information
- School type: Charter school
- Established: 2003; 23 years ago
- Principal: William Nee
- Grades: 9-12
- Enrollment: c.350
- Website: www.unityhigh.org

Unity High School (Unity) is an independent charter high school in Oakland, California. The school opened in the fall (autumn) of 2003 and currently enrolls about 350 ninth to twelfth grade students. The principal is William Nee and the assistant principal is Keisha Pierre-Stephen.
