= List of African-American neighborhoods =

The list contains the names of cities, districts, and neighborhoods in the U.S. that are predominantly African American or that are strongly associated with African-American culture— either currently or historically. Included are areas that contain high concentrations of blacks or African Americans. Not counted are Afro-Caribbeans, Afro-Latinos, Afro-Asian, Afro-Indian, Afro-Polynesian, West African, and Sub-Saharan African immigrants.

The largest African-American community is in Atlanta, Georgia; followed by Washington, DC; Houston, Texas; Chicago, Illinois; Miami, Florida; and Detroit, Michigan. About 80 percent of the city population is African-American. A quarter of Metro Detroit (Macomb, Oakland and Wayne counties) are African-American.

== Neighborhoods and Master Planned Communities ==
=== Alabama ===
Birmingham

- 16th Street
- East Thomas
- Ensley
- North Birmingham
- Smithfield
- Titusville
- Black Belt of Alabama – 18 counties in Alabama, a total of 52% African-American population.
- Hobson City
- Mobile
- Dauphin Square
- Leinkauf
- Montgomery
- Prichard
- Skyline
- White Hall

=== Alaska ===
- Fairbanks

=== Arizona ===
- Arcadia, Maricopa County, Phoenix and Scottsdale, Arizona
- Chandler, Maricopa County Southeast of Phoenix, next to Gilbert
- Dunbar Spring Tucson, Pima County, Arizona
- Gilbert, Maricopa County
- Glendale, Maricopa County
- Goodyear, Maricopa County
- Marana, Pima County, Northwest of Tucson
- Maryvale Phoenix
- Randolph, Pinal County (historical)
- Tempe, Maricopa County, Arizona

=== Arkansas ===
Altheimer

Birdsong

Conway

Cross Roads, Arkansas

Dumas

Gould

Grady

Helena and West Helena

Hensley

Jonesboro

Lake Village

Little Rock

- East Little Rock
- Southwest

Pine Bluff

Stuttgart

Tucker

West Memphis

=== California ===
Allensworth in Tulare County (historical)

Antelope Valley

Avenal

Bakersfield

- Lakeview
- Oleander/Sunset
- Southwest Bakersfield

Berkeley

- Lorin District
- South Berkeley
- West Berkeley

Blacks Beach, Santa Monica (historic).

Bruce's Beach, Manhattan Beach (historic).

California City

Chowchilla

Woodland Park, Chula Vista

Corcoran

East Palo Alto – one of Silicon Valley's largest Black percentage cities, declined from a Black majority or plurality in 1970s and 1980s (17% from 2010)

Emeryville

Fairfield

- Tolenas

Folsom (historic Negro Bar).

Fresno

- Edison (Southwest Fresno)

Hayward – communities found in Jackson Triangle, North Hayward, and Upper B Street areas.

- Hercules
- Lake Elsinore – Yarborough neighborhood of Old Town. Riverside County – goes back to the 1880s when the city incorporated (historic).

Long Beach – Concentrated near north of 10th Street and south of Willow Street, east of Long Beach Boulevard and west of Walnut Avenue.

- Davenport Park
- Central Long Beach
- North
- Ramona Park

Los Angeles

- Adams Lake (decreasingly black).
- Adams-Normandie
- Baldwin Hills (some in unincorporated county area)
- Bronzeville (historic)
- Chesterfield Square
- Crenshaw
- Exposition Park
- Gramercy Park
- Green Meadows
- Hyde Park
- Jefferson Park
- Lafayette Square
- Lake View Terrace
- Leimert Park
- Little Ethiopia (home to an Ethiopian and Eritrean community)
- Manchester Square
- Mid City
- Normandie Gardens (Southwest Los Angeles)
- Pico-Union (historic, no longer very black)
- South of Interstate 10 in South L.A. (historic, now abandoned, called "Ghost Town")
- South Central (Florence/Normandie intersection site of 1992 riot)
- Venice (Oakwood)
- Vermont Knolls
- Vermont Square
- Vermont Vista
- Victoria Park
- Village Green
- Watts
- West Adams
- Westchester

Los Angeles County

- Altadena
- Athens
- Carson
- Compton (especially in Downtown Compton and Sunny Cove)
- "Freetown", Whittier
- Gardena
- Hawthorne
- Inglewood
  - Crenshaw-Imperial
  - Hollywood Park
  - Morningside Park
  - North Inglewood
- Ladera Heights
- Lancaster
- Palmdale
- Pomona
- Sun Village
- View Park-Windsor Hills
- West Athens
- West Compton
- Westmont
- Willowbrook

Marin City

Merced

- Loughborough, North Merced
- Childs Ave, South Merced
- Glen Ave, East Merced

Oakland

- Acorn Projects
- Beulah (historic district)
- Broadway Auto Row
- Brookfield Village
- Bushrod Park
- Campbell Village Court
- Cypress Hill or "the Tree" (more Mexican and Latino).
- Chabot Park
- Cypress Village
- Dimond District
- Dogtown
- Downtown Oakland
- Eastmont
- East Oakland
- Elmhurst
- Ghost Town
- Golden Gate
- Havenscourt
- Lincoln Park/ Lincoln Square (more Chinese and Asian).
- Lockwood Gardens
- Longfellow
- Lower Bottoms
- Lower Oakland.
- Maxwell Park
- Millsmont
- North Oakland, which also includes Ethiopian and Eritrean American communities
- Ralph Bunche
- San Antonio
- Santa Fe
- Seminary
- Sequoyah Heights
- Sobrante Park
- West Oakland

Pasadena (esp southwest side and South Pasadena)

Pinole

Pittsburg

Richmond

- Fairmede-Hilltop
- Iron Triangle
- Parchester Village

Riverside –

- Blaine Park.
- East Side Riverside – along University and Chicago Avenues.
- North End Riverside.
- Raincross Square – downtown.
- University City.
- University Heights.

Nearby cities:

  - Blythe – (15% black)
  - Crossley Tract, Palm Springs extends to Cathedral City.
  - Desert Highland Gateway Estates, Palm Springs.
  - Desert Hot Springs.
  - Dream Homes Subdivision, Cathedral City, (near Palm Springs).
  - Mead Valley.
  - Moreno Valley – (17% black).
  - Nobles Ranch near Indio Fashion Mall, Indio.
  - North End, Palm Springs.
    - Desert Highland Gateway Estates
    - Palm Springs Villas II
    - Mountain Gate
  - Perris – esp. near March Air Base.
  - Section 14, Palm Springs (historic, abandoned in the 1960s).
  - West Indio (Nairobi Village) (limited).

Sacramento

- Del Paso Heights
- Meadowview area.
- Natomas
- North Sacramento
- Oak Park

Nearby cities:

  - Elk Grove
  - Fruitridge Pocket
  - Parkway

San Bernardino area –

- Downtown San Bernardino.
- Indian Springs, near Seccombe Lake Park.
- Mount Vernon Avenue.
- University District, San Bernardino (Kendall Farms and North Park).
- Waterman-North End.
- West Side San Bernardino.

Nearby cities:

  - Adelanto – 20.5% due to most leaving to San Bernardino County and the Victorville area.
  - Alta Loma in Rancho Cucamonga.
  - Barstow – concentrated in northeast Barstow along with Hispanics.
  - Downtown Colton – among many Hispanics.
  - Fontana – esp. north of Foothill Blvd.
  - Highland.
  - Muscoy – unincorporated.
  - Rialto – esp. East side.
  - Twentynine Palms near 29 Palms USMC Base.
  - Victorville – esp. Eagle Ranch.
  - west side Rancho Cucamonga.

San Diego

- Broadway Heights
- Chollas View
- City Heights
- Emerald Hills
- Encanto
- Lincoln Park
- Mount Hope
- Mountain View
- North Park
- Skyline
- Southeast San Diego
- Valencia Park

San Diego area-

  - Calipatria
  - Lemon Grove
  - Oceanside (over 5%, Camp Pendleton).

San Francisco

- Bayview-Hunters Point
- Fillmore District
- India Basin
- Ocean View
- Potrero Terrace
- Sunnydale
- Western Addition

San Jose

- Alameda Street (gentrified in the 2000s).
- Almaden – formerly black area.
- Autumn Street/West Side (historic, no longer mostly black).
- Burbank, Santa Clara County, California/ Burbank District in San Jose.
- Northwest side – has the historic Coachella Valley Church.

Bristol Street, McFadden Avenue, Raitt Street and Santa Ana Boulevard in Santa Ana

Santa Clara

Santa Rosa - South Park (historic), and Black/Eritrean communities in Northcoast Street/Piner Road area

Seaside

Stockton

- Downtown Stockton
- Kentfield
- Weberstown

Suisun City (20%) – Solano County.

Susanville

Tehachapi

Vallejo

- North Vallejo
- South Vallejo
- West Vallejo

Val Verde resort (historic).

Weed

- Lincoln Heights (mostly burned down in September 2022 fire; parts of Weed have some Black residents but fewer compared to mid-20th century when most of the Black community worked on the railroads).

Mono Lake and nearby Bishop, Mammoth Lakes and Round Valley developed large Black percentages near the NV state line. Blythe, Big River, Havasu and Needles near the AZ state line. And towards Oregon (Siskiyou county) and the Mexican border (Imperial valley)

=== Colorado ===
Aurora

Colorado Springs

- Southeast Colorado Springs

Denver

- East Denver
- Five Points
- Montbello
- North Park Hill
- Northeast Park Hill

Fountain

=== Connecticut ===
Bloomfield

Blue Hills

Bridgeport

Capaco

Danbury

North End, Hartford

Middletown

New Haven

- Hill
- Newhallville
- Fair Haven
- Beaver Hills

New London

Norwalk

Stamford

Waterbury

=== District of Columbia ===
(Washington, D.C.)

Peaking at 75% black in the mid-1970s after five previous decades of the Great Migration increased the black population five-fold, DC is 46–49% black in 2018. DC remains the largest African-American percentage population of any state or territory in the mainland US.

- Adams Morgan
- Anacostia
- Arboretum
- Barry Farm
- Barney Circle
- Bellevue
- Benning
- Benning Ridge
- Brentwood
- Buena Vista
- Burrville
- Capitol Hill
- Carver Langston
- Central Northeast
- Civic Betterment
- Cleveland Park
- Congress Heights
- Deanwood
- Douglass
- Dupont Park
- Eastland Gardens
- Eckington
- Edgewood
- Fairfax Village
- Fairlawn
- Foggy Bottom
- Fort Davis
- Fort Dupont
- Fort Lincoln
- Garfield Heights
- Good Hope
- Greenway
- Hillbrook
- Hillcrest
- Ivy City
- Kenilworth
- Kingman Park
- Knox Hill
- Langdon
- Lincoln Heights
- Logan Circle
- Marshall Heights
- Mayfair
- Michigan Park
- Mount Pleasant
- Naylor Gardens
- North Michigan Park
- Northwest side (closer to Mount Pleasant)
- Penn Branch
- Petworth
- Randle Highlands
- River Terrace
- Riggs Park
- Shaw
- Shipley Terrace
- Skyland
- The Strivers' Section
- Sursum Corda
- Trinidad, Washington, D.C.
- Twining
- U Street Corridor
- Washington Highlands
- Woodland
- Woodridge

=== Florida ===
Angola

Collier County

- Ave Maria
- Ave Maria

East Dunbar, Fort Myers

Fort Lauderdale

- Deepside
- Franklin Park
- Golden Heights
- Washington Park

Gretna

Hillsborough County

- Lutz, Florida
- New Tampa, Florida
- Riverview, Florida
- Ruskin, Florida
- Tampa
- Carver City-Lincoln Gardens, Tampa
- Central Tampa
- College Hill
- East Tampa, Florida

* New Tampa, Florida

- West Tampa
- Valrico, Florida
- Westchase, Florida
- Wimauma, Florida

Jacksonville

- Brooklyn
- LaVilla

Lee County

- Bonita Springs
- Cape Coral
- Fort Myers

Miami and Miami-Dade County

- Brownsville
- Carol City, neighborhood of Miami Gardens
- Coconut Grove
- Goulds
- Liberty City
- Little Haiti
- Miami Gardens
- Model City
- Opa-locka
- Overtown
- Richmond Heights
- West Perrine

Orange County

- Eatonville - highest percentage in FL.
- Orlando (Central section).
- Parramore, Orlando
- Pine Hills
- Tangelo

Newtown, Palatka

Kendall Green, Pompano Beach

Palm Beach County

- Belle Glade
- Pahokee
- West Palm Beach

Pasco County

- Wesley Chapel

Polk County

- Moorehead, now the site of RP Funding Center
- Webster Park

Prospect Bluff Historic Sites

Riviera Beach

Rosewood (historic)

Fort Mose Historic State Park, St. Augustine

Sanford

Sea Islands (northern coast), home to the Gullah and Geechee peoples (African creoles).

South Bay

Frenchtown, Tallahassee

St. Johns County

- St. Augustine

Carver Ranches, West Park

=== Georgia ===
Atlanta - majority African-American.

- Adamsville
- Bankhead
- Ben Hill
- Camilla
- Cascade Heights
- College Park
- Collier Heights
- Conyers
- Covington
- Decatur -
- Dublin
- Duluth (20.2%)
- East Point
- Fairburn
- Fort Valley
- Fulton County
- Gainesville
- Sandy Springs
- Kirkwood
- Lawrenceville
- Louisville
- Mableton
- Macon
- Marietta
- Mechanicsville
- Morrow
- Newnan (30.6%)
- Old Fourth Ward
- Palmetto (56.9%)
- Peachtree Corners (23.3%)
- Powder Springs
- Riverdale
- Russell
- Sandtown
- Smyrna
- Southwestern Atlanta
- Summerhill
- Sweet Auburn
- Union City
- Warner Robins
- Washington Park
- West End

Albany

Augusta

Bellevue, Macon

Cairo

Clayton County

- Jonesboro
- Morrow

Douglasville

Hancock County

Hinesville

Jefferson County

Lithonia

Macon

Savannah

Sea Islands (southern coast), home to the Gullah and Geechee peoples (African creoles).

Stewart County

Stone Mountain

- Downtown
- Redan
- Stephenson

Talbot County

=== Idaho ===
- Mountain Home near Mountain Home AFB.

=== Illinois ===
Cairo

Chicago

- South Side
  - Ashburn
  - Auburn Gresham
  - Avalon Park
  - Bronzeville
  - Burnside
  - Calumet Heights
  - Chatham
  - Chicago Lawn
  - Douglas
  - Englewood
  - Fuller Park
  - Grand Boulevard
  - Greater Grand Crossing
  - Hyde Park
  - Kenwood
  - Morgan Park
  - Near South Side
  - New City
  - Oakland
  - Pullman
  - Riverdale
  - Roseland
  - South Chicago
  - South Deering
  - South Shore
  - Washington Heights
  - Washington Park
  - West Englewood
  - West Pullman
  - Woodlawn
- West Side
  - Austin
  - East Garfield Park
  - Humboldt Park
  - Near West Side
  - North Lawndale
  - West Garfield Park
- North Side
  - Cabrini Green
- Suburbs
  - Bellwood
  - Broadview
  - Burnham
  - Calumet City
  - Calumet Park
  - Chicago Heights
  - Country Club Hills
  - Crete (Lincolnshire Estates, Willowbrook Estates)
  - Dixmoor
  - Dolton
  - East Hazel Crest
  - Flossmoor
  - Ford Heights
  - Glenwood
  - Harvey
  - Hazel Crest
  - Hillside
  - Homewood
  - Lansing
  - Lynwood
  - Markham
  - Matteson
  - Maywood
  - Olympia Fields
  - Park Forest
  - Phoenix
  - Richton Park
  - Riverdale
  - Robbins
  - Sauk Village
  - South Holland
  - University Park

Joliet

- Forest Park
- Preston Heights

Kankakee County

- Hopkins Park
- Sun River Terrace

Peoria

- West Peoria

Pulaski County

St. Clair County

- Brooklyn
- Cahokia Heights
- East St. Louis
- Washington Park

=== Indiana ===
Gary

- Downtown
- Ambridge Mann
- Brunswick
- Downtown West
- Tolleston
- Glen Park
- Midtown
- Aetna
- Emerson
- Miller Beach

Indianapolis

- Avondale Meadows
- Bridgeport (Sunnyside/West Parkview) (historic)
- Crooked Creek
- Devington
- Haughville
- Indiana Avenue (historic)
  - Flanner House Homes
  - Lockefield Gardens
  - Ransom Place Historic District
- Martindale–Brightwood
- Norwood
- United Northwest Area
  - Northwest–Riverside

Merrillville

Washington Township, Randolph County (outside Lynn – 1% while it's higher outside Lynn)

=== Iowa ===
Cedar Rapids

Des Moines

- Drake Park
- King-Irving Park
- Oak Ridge
- River Bend
- Sherman Hill

Quad Cities area

- Davenport

Saylorville

=== Kansas ===
Cherokee Township (Weir, Kansas)

Dodge City

Kansas City, Kansas

Morton City, Kansas ("Exoduster" historic site)

Wichita

- Fairmount
- Ken-Mar
- Matlock Heights
- McAdams, Wichita, Kansas
- North Central
- Northeast Heights
- Northeast Millair

Junction City

=== Kentucky ===
Lexington

- Elkhorn Park
- Idle Hour - Idle Hour Country Club (10+%)
- Winburn

Louisville

- Algonquin
- Berrytown
- California
- Chickasaw
- Hallmark
- Jacobs
- Limerick
- Newburg
- Old Louisville
- Park DuValle
- Park Hill
- Parkland
- Petersburg
- Phoenix Hill
- Poplar Hills
- Russell
- Shawnee
- Shelby Park
- Shively
- Smoketown

Paducah – While the city itself is about 25% African American, the city school district's high school is about 50% African American.

Russellville

- Black Bottom

=== Louisiana ===
Acadiana region in Louisiana has several historically African-American majority towns.

Alexandria

Baker

Bastrop

Baton Rouge

Black Belt of Louisiana - Bobtown, Mossville, St. Maurice and Washington.

Boyce

Donaldsonville

Edgar

Grambling

Jeanerette

Lafayette

Lake Charles

Mississippi Delta region.

Monroe

Natchitoches

New Iberia (Also has a rich Louisiana Creole history)

New Orleans

- Black Pearl
- Central City
- Desire Area
- Dixon
- Florida Area
- Gert Town
- Hollygrove
- Holy Cross
- Lower 9th Ward
- Marlyville
- Parts of Algiers
- Parts of Eastern New Orleans
- Pigeon Town
- Seventh Ward (neighborhood)
- St. Claude
- St. Roch
- Treme
- Tulane/Gravier

Opelousas

Shreveport

St. Gabriel

Tallulah

Wallace

Ville Platte

=== Maine ===
Kennedy Park, Portland

=== Maryland ===
Anne Arundel County

- Jessup

Baltimore

- Ashburton
- Barclay
- Belair-Edison
- Berea
- Better Waverly
- Broadway East
- Brooklyn
- Cedonia
- Cherry Hill
- Coppin Heights
- East Baltimore Midway
- Edmondson Village
- Ednor Gardens-Lakeside
- Greenmount West
- Gwynn's Falls
- Johnston Square
- Jonestown
- McElderry Park
- Middle East
- Mid-Govans
- Mondawmin
- Mosher
- Oliver
- Pen Lucy
- Pimlico
- Rosemont
- Sandtown-Winchester
- Upton
- Waverly
- Wilson Park

Baltimore County

- Lochearn
- Milford Mill
- Owings Mills
- Randallstown
- Turners Station
- Woodlawn

Berry Road area (MD route 228).

Charles County

- Hughesville
- La Plata.
- Pomonkey
- Waldorf

Montgomery County

- Ken-Gar

Prince George's County

- Accokeek
- Bladensburg
- Camp Springs
- Capitol Heights
- Cheverly
- Chillum
- Clinton
- Coral Hills
- District Heights
- Eagle Harbor
- Fairmount
- Forest Heights
- Forestville
- Fort Washington
- Friendly
- Glenarden
- Glenn Dale
- Greenbelt
- Hillcrest Heights
- Kettering
- Lake Arbor
- Largo
- Laurel
- Marlow Heights
- Marlton
- Mitchellville
- New Carrollton
- North Brentwood
- Rosaryville
- Seat Pleasant
- South Laurel
- Springdale
- Suitland
- Temple Hills
- Upper Marlboro
- Walker Mill
- Woodlawn
- Woodmore

Ridge near St. Inigoes

St. Mary's County

Somerset County

- Princess Anne

=== Massachusetts ===
Boston

- Beacon Hill (historically)
- Dorchester
  - Dot-west (West Dorchester)
- Hyde Park
- Jamaica Plain
- Mattapan
- Roxbury
- Blue Hill Avenue
- South Boston (site of 1975 racial conflicts in integration of a high school).
- West End (also had Latinos, Italians and Jews, and Irish).

Other places in MA

- Brockton Massachusetts
- Brookline Massachusetts
- Cambridge Massachusetts
- Chestnut Hill Massachusetts
- Concord Massachusetts
- Everett Massachusetts
- Leverett Massachusetts
- Lowell Massachusetts, aka "Mill City".
- Lynn Massachusetts.
- Marblehead Massachusetts
- Malden Massachusetts.
- Medford Massachusetts.
- New Bedford Massachusetts (New Bedford has many Portuguese, Cape Verdeans and Angolans).
- Newburyport Massachusetts
- Newton Massachusetts
- Oak Bluffs Massachusetts|Oak Bluffs- (sizable affluent Black-African American community, esp. tourism and seasonal residences).
- Provincetown Massachusetts
- Randolph Massachusetts.
- Stoughton Massachusetts
- Springfield Massachusetts (Springfield had a historic amateur black basketball team the Americans known to play against the Harlem Globetrotters who later became an entertainment team).
- Waltham Massachusetts
- West Medford
- Worcester
- Belmont Street
- Main South
- Norrback Avenue
- Plumley Village East Projects

=== Michigan ===
Bay City

Benton Harbor – site of 2003 riots

Beverly Hills

Birmingham

Bloomfield area-

- Bloomfield Village
- Charing Cross
- Circle
- Oak Grove

Bloomfield Hills

West Bloomfield

Detroit

- Black Bottom
- Brightmoor
- Clark Park
- Conant Gardens
- Dexter-Linwood
- Downriver
- East Side
- "South" Side
- Southwest Side
- West Side

Flint

Hamtramck

Highland Park

Inkster

Jackson

Kalamazoo

Lansing

Midland

Muskegon Heights

Pontiac

Saginaw

Southfield

Warren – est. 15–20%.

=== Minnesota ===
Minneapolis

- Jordan
- Hawthorne
- Near North
- Harrison
- Willard-Hay
- Cedar-Riverside
- Folwell
- McKinley
- Cleveland
- Phillips
- Powderhorn

Rochester

- River Court
- Sunnyside

Saint Paul

- Thomas-Dale
- Summit-University

=== Mississippi ===
Black Belt of Mississippi – Large African-American majority region.

Byhalia

Clarksdale - 68% black

Davis Bend, Mississippi/Louisiana.

Falcon – 98% black.

Russ College

Jackson

- Georgetown
- Queens-Magnolia Terrace
- Shady Oaks
- Stadium Side
- Presidential Hills
- Virden Addition
- Washington Addition

University Park/Palisades

Leland - 2/3 of the town is black.

Mississippi Delta region.

Mound Bayou – 98% black.

Tougaloo

Yazoo City

=== Missouri ===
Charleston

Hayti Heights

Kansas City

- Hyde Park
- Hickman Mills
- Holmes Park
- Martin City
- Red Bridge
- Ruskin Heights

St. Louis

- North St. Louis (the West Walnut Manor area).
- Old North St. Louis
- Tower Grove South
- The Ville
- Walnut Park area of St. Louis

St. Louis County

- Berkeley
- Black Jack – 80% black.
- Calverton Park
- Castle Point
- Cool Valley
- Country Club Hills – 90% black
- Dellwood
- Ferguson
- Flordell Hills
- Jennings
- Kinloch
- Meacham Park
- Normandy
- Pine Lawn
- Woodstock

=== Nebraska ===
Bellevue

Lincoln

Omaha - Northeast, Omaha

- Lexington

South Sioux City

=== Nevada ===
- Tule Springs North Las Vegas, Clark County
- West Las Vegas
- North Las Vegas, Nevada - Master Planned Communities (21% black)

=== New Jersey ===
- East Orange
- Hillside
- Irvington
- Paterson
- Bridgeton
- Jersey City
- Elizabeth
- New Brunswick
- Passaic
- Winslow
- Somerset
- Englewood
- Lindenwold
- Rahway
- Vineland
- Millville
- Linden
- Perth Amboy
- Teaneck
- Burlington
- Hackensack
- Pennsauken
- Vauxhall
- Long Branch
- Montclair
- Newark
  - Weequahic
- Orange
- Plainfield
- Roselle
- Trenton
- Asbury Park
- Neptune
- Atlantic City
- Camden
- Chesilhurst
- Lawnside
- Pleasantville
- Salem
- Seabrook Farms
- Willingboro
- Whitesboro
- Ewing
- Collingswood
- Mount Holly
- Sicklerville
- Carteret
- Pemberton
- Galloway
- Deptford
- Lakewood
- Haddon Heights
- Springfield-Belmont
- Community Park, Princeton
- Gouldtown, New Jersey

=== New Mexico ===
Albuquerque

- Parts of Downtown Albuquerque
- Kirtland Air Force Base
- South Broadway (somewhat historical, but area still retains a visible African-American community)

Blackdom (historical; currently a ghost town)

Clovis (some areas)

Hobbs (some areas)

=== New York ===
Albany

- Arbor Hill
- Delaware Avenue Neighborhood
- Dudley Heights
- Groesbeckville
- Kenwood
- Mansion District
- North Albany
- The Pastures
- South End
- West Hill

Buffalo

- Cold Springs
- East Side
- Hamlin Park
- Kensington
- Schiller Park

Mount Vernon

- Oakwood Heights
- South Side
- West Mount Vernon

Niagara Falls

- North End
- Little Italy
- East End
- Hyde Park
- South End

Nassau County

- Baldwin
- Elmont
- Freeport
- Hempstead
- Lakeview
- New Cassel
- North Valley Stream
- Roosevelt
- South Floral Park
- Uniondale

New York City

- The Bronx:
  - Allerton
  - Baychester
  - Co-op City
  - Eastchester
  - Edenwald
  - Fordham
  - Highbridge
  - Morrisania
  - Mott Haven
  - Olinville
  - Parkchester
  - Soundview
  - South Bronx
  - Tremont
  - Wakefield
  - Williamsbridge
- Brooklyn:
  - Bedford-Stuyvesant
  - Brownsville
  - Bushwick
  - Canarsie
  - City Line
  - Clinton Hill
  - Crown Heights (site of 1991 riot)
  - Cypress Hills
  - East Flatbush
  - East New York
  - Flatbush
  - Flatlands
  - Fort Greene
  - Ocean Hill
  - Starrett City
  - Stuyvesant Heights
  - Weeksville
  - Wingate
- Manhattan:
  - Hamilton Heights
  - Harlem (the "Black Mecca" of African-American culture, esp 1920s–30s).
  - San Juan Hill
  - Seneca Village (destroyed when creating Central Park)
  - Sugar Hill
- Queens:
  - Arverne
  - Cambria Heights
  - East Elmhurst
  - Elmhurst
  - Far Rockaway
  - Hollis
  - Jamaica
  - Laurelton
  - Queensbridge
  - Queens Village
  - Rosedale
  - St. Albans (including Addisleigh Park)
  - South Jamaica
  - Springfield Gardens
- Staten Island:
  - Clifton
  - Mariners Harbor
  - New Brighton
  - Park Hill
  - Stapleton
  - Tompkinsville

Orange County

- Newburgh
- Middletown

Poughkeepsie (site of 1927 race riot)

Rochester

- 19th Ward
- Plymouth-Exchange
- Genesee-Jefferson
- Corn Hill
- Group 14621
- Marketview Heights
- Beechwood
- Homestead Heights
- Edgerton

Rockland County

- Central Nyack
- Heritage Dr., New City
- Hillcrest
- Nyack
- Spring Valley

Suffolk County

- Wyandanch
- Gordon Heights
- North Bellport
- North Amityville
- Wheatley Heights

Syracuse

- Brighton
- Elmwood
- Near Eastside
- North Valley
- Salt Springs

Utica

- Cornhill

White Plains

- Northwest White Plains
- Fisher Hill, White Plains

Yonkers

- Runyon Heights
- Southwest Yonkers

=== North Carolina ===
East End/Valley Street Neighborhood, Asheville

Eastland, Charlotte

Hayti, Durham

Emorywoods Estate, Durham, North Carolina

Elizabeth City

Goldsboro

Greensboro – 40.6% black, historic black city in the South since slavery, colonial times, Civil rights and the Civil war.

Henderson

James City

Kinston (62% black)

Crestdale Matthews Formerly Tank Town

Oxford

Princeville

Raleigh

- East Raleigh–South Park Historic District – Largest African American neighborhood in Raleigh.
- Madonna Acres Historic District, historic black district in Raleigh

Rocky Mount

Roxboro

Sedalia

Tarboro

Wadesboro

Williamston

Woodland (45/45% split black/white)

=== Ohio ===
Akron

Canton

Cincinnati

- Avondale
- Bond Hill
- College Hill
- East Westwood
- English Woods
- Evanston
- Kennedy Heights
- Madisonville
- Millvale
- Mount Airy
- North Avondale
- North Fairmount
- Over-the-Rhine
- Paddock Hills
- Pendleton
- Queensgate
- Roselawn
- South Cumminsville
- South Fairmount
- Spring Grove Village
- Villages at Roll Hill
- West End
- Westwood
- Winton Hills

Cleveland

- Buckeye-Shaker
- Central
- Fairfax
- Glenville
- Hough
- Lee-Miles
- South Collinwood
- Woodland Hills
  - Nearby Cuyahoga County
  - Bedford Heights
  - East Cleveland
  - North Randall
  - Warrensville Heights

Columbus

- Driving Park
- Mount Vernon
- Near East Side
- Berwick
- Far East
- Milo-Grogan
- Windsor Terrace
- Urbancrest

Dayton

- Oregon District

East Jackson-Waverly

Newark

Springfield

Toledo

- North Park
- South Side

Warren

Warrensville Heights

Youngstown

- Downtown Youngstown
- North Heights

=== Oklahoma ===
Oklahoma has a few surviving all-black or African-American majority towns as a result of the Land Rush of 1889, similar to the Exodusters after the Civil War (1860s) to nearby Kansas. One example is Freedom not to be confused with Freedom in the western half of the state.

"All-Black" settlements that were part of the Land Run of 1889.

- Boley.
- Brooksville.
- Clearview.
- Grayson.
- Lima.
- Red Bird.
- Rentiesville.
- Summit.
- Taft, facing Osage Nation and Cherokee Nation tribal areas (Black Cherokees).
- Tatums.
- Tullahassee.
- Vernon.

Among the Oklahoma Territory all Black towns no longer in existence are Lincoln, Cimarron City, Bailey, Zion, Emanuel, Udora, and Douglas.

Bristow – 10% Black

Eufaula

Langston

Oklahoma City

- Bricktown
- Deep Deuce
- Eastside, Oklahoma City
- Edwards Heights Historic District
- Northeast Oklahoma City
- Town of Forest Park
  - Nearby Midwest City

Tahlequah East side

Tulsa – 15% black city

- East Side
- Greenwood, Tulsa ("Black wall street" in 1920s)
- Neighborhoods of Tulsa, Oklahoma#Northside – North Tulsa
- West Side (Downtown)

Turley – 20–25% Black

=== Oregon ===
Portland

- Alberta Arts District
- Albina Street
- Boise
- Eliot
- Humboldt
- King
- Piedmont
- Vernon
- Woodlawn

Eugene

- Skinner Butte
- Glenwood
- West 11th Avenue Neighborhood

=== Pennsylvania ===
Philadelphia

- City neighborhoods
  - Allegheny West
  - Brewerytown
  - Carroll Park
  - Cecil B. Moore
  - Clearview
  - Cobbs Creek
  - Eastwick
  - Elmwood Park
  - Fern Rock
  - Frankford
  - Germantown
  - Glenwood
  - Grays Ferry
  - Haddington
  - Hawthorne
  - Kingsessing
  - Ludlow
  - Mantua
  - Mount Airy
  - Mill Creek
  - Nicetown-Tioga
  - North Central
  - Overbrook
  - Olney-Oak Lane
  - Parkside
  - Penrose
  - Point Breeze
  - Poplar
  - Southwest Center City
  - Strawberry Mansion
  - University City – black plurality today.
  - Walnut Hill
  - West Philadelphia
  - Wynnefield
- Suburbs
  - Cheltenham
  - Chester
  - Cheyney
  - Collingdale
  - Crestmont
  - Darby
  - East Lansdowne
  - Norristown
  - Sharon Hill
  - Upper Darby
  - Yeadon

Pittsburgh

- City neighborhoods
  - The Hill District
  - Homewood
  - Larimer
  - Beltzhoover
  - Manchester
  - Hazelwood
  - California-Kirkbride
  - Arlington Heights
  - St. Clair
  - East Liberty
  - Garfield
  - Lincoln-Lemington-Belmar
  - Perry South
  - Fairywood
- Suburbs
  - Homestead
  - Braddock
  - Rankin
  - Duquesne
  - Wilkinsburg

=== Rhode Island ===
Pawtucket

Providence

- Federal Hill – developed sizable black population since the 1960s.
- Mount Hope
- South Providence

=== South Carolina ===
South Carolina is part of the Black Belt geological formation

Acabee

Allendale

Bennettsville

Charleston

Columbia

- Waverly
- Eastover

Greenville

Lake City

Marion

North Charleston

Orangeburg

Red Top

Ridgeland

Rock Hill (38.3%)

Sea Islands (South Carolina coast, home to the Gullah and Geechee peoples (African creoles).

Sumter (47.03%)

=== Tennessee ===
Chattanooga

Denmark

Dyersburg

Jackson

Knoxville

Memphis

- Beale Street (historic district)
- Orange Mound
- South Memphis
- Whitehaven
- North Memphis
- Hickory Hill
- Frayser
- Douglass
- Southwind
- Riverside
- Hollywood
- Hyde Park
- Binghampton
- Uptown
- Parkway Village

Nashville

- Cleveland Park
- Bordeaux, Tennessee
- Whites Creek
- North Nashville
- East Nashville
- East Davidson County
- Antioch
- Southeast Davidson
- Hermitage

Whiteville

=== Texas ===
Austin

- Rosewood Park
- Oak Springs
- University Hills
- Cavalier Park
- 11th Street
- Loyola Lane
- Johnny Morris
- Oak Springs
- Austin Colony
- Springdale

Austin suburbs

- Bastrop - Black population, 965 (9.96%) in 2020 Census
  - Shiloh
- Hornsby Bend - Black population, 2,208 (18.15%) in 2020 Census
- Hutto - Black population, 3,459 (12.54%) in 2020 Census
- Pflugerville - Black population, 9,624 (14.76%) in 2020 Census
- Round Rock - Black population, 11,552 (9.67%) in 2020 Census
  - Shenandoah
- Wells Branch - Black population, 2,426 (17.33%) in 2020 Census
- Windemere - Black population, 16.82% in 2010 Census

Beaumont-Port Arthur-Orange (Golden Triangle area)

- Beaumont - Black population, 54,034 (46.87%) in 2020 Census
  - South Park
- Port Arthur - Black population, 21,046 (37.56%) in 2020 Census
  - Gulfway
- Orange - Black population, 6,795 (35.16%) in 2020 Census

Central Texas - Waco-College Station area.

- Bryan - Black population, 12,876 (15.33%) in 2020 Census
- Calvert - Black population, 482 (50.10%) in 2020 Census
- Navasota - Black population, 2,018 (26.40%) in 2020 Census
- Waco - Black population, 26,844 (19.38%) in 2020 Census
  - East Waco

Corpus Christi Texas, Nueces County

- Bay Area, Corpus Christi
- Calallen, Corpus Christi
- Hillcrest, Corpus Christi
- Mustang-Padre Island, Corpus Christi
- Northwest, Corpus Christi
- South Side, Corpus Christi

Dallas-Fort Worth Metroplex

Dallas

- North east Dallas
- Oak Cliff
- Pleasant Grove
- South Dallas
- Skillman Road
- West Dallas.
- Old East Dallas
- Hamilton Park
- Arlington Park
- Vickery Meadow
- South Fergusun
- Love Field Area

Dallas County

- Cedar Hill - Black population, 25,790 (52.47%) in 2020 Census
- DeSoto - Black population, 38,971 (69.41%) in 2020 Census
- Duncanville - Black population, 12,085 (29.69%) in 2020 Census
- Grand Prairie - Black population, 46,360 (23.64%) in 2020 Census
- Irving - Black population, 31,714 (12.36%) in 2020 Census
- Lancaster - Black population, 27,078 (65.60%) in 2020 Census

Fort Worth

- Como
- Stop Six
- Woodhaven
- Meadowbrook
- Eastwood
- Poly
- Northbrook

Tarrant County

- Arlington - Black population, 88,230 (22.38%) in 2020 Census
- Mansfield - Black population, 15,539 (21.40%) in 2020 Census
- Euless - Black population, 9,626 (15.77%) in 2020 Census
- Forest Hill - Black population, 5,490 (39.34%) in 2020 Census
- Bedford - Black population, 5,693 (11.40%) in 2020 Census
- Hurst - Black population, 3,996 (9.89%) in 2020 Census

East Texas has some Black majority towns. Also known as the Big Thicket, and Piney Woods region

- Ames - Black population, 700 (74.71%) in 2020 Census
- Athens - Black population, 2,059 (16.01%) in 2020 Census
- Browndell - Black population, 78 (48.75%) in 2020 Census
- Cuney - Black population, 69 (59.48%) in 2020 Census
- Domino - Black population, 59 (83.10%) in 2020 Census
- Goodlow - Black population, 133 (74.70%) in 2020 Census
- Huntsville - Black population, 11,420 (24.86%) in 2020 Census
  - Phelps
- Jasper - Black population, 3,101 (45.45%) in 2020 Census
- Lufkin - Black population, 9,045 (26.49%) in 2020 Census
- Nacogdoches - Black population, 8,376 (26.06%) in 2020 Census
- San Augustine - Black population, 968 (50.42%) in 2020 Census
- Seven Oaks - Black population, 28 (41.20%) in 2020 Census

Houston

- Acres Homes
- Alief
- Bammel
- Bordersville
- Brays Oaks
- Clinton Park
- Cloverland
- Cypress Station
- Fifth Ward
- Fourth Ward
- Frenchtown
- Greenspoint
- Herschelwood
- Hiram Clarke
- Homestead
- Imperial Valley
- Independence Heights – Studewood
- Inwood Forest
- Kashmere Gardens
- Lakewood
- North Houston
- Rosewood
- Sharpstown
- South Park
- Southwest Houston
- Settegast
- Southside
- Sunnyside
- Trinity Garden
- Third Ward
- Westfield
- Yellowstone

Houston Suburbs

- Barrett - Black population, 2,324 (44.50%) in 2020 Census
- Baytown - Black population, 13,652 (16.31%) in 2020 Census
- Conroe - Black population, 8,951 (9.95%) in 2020 Census
- Freeport - Black population, 13,690 (55.91%) in 2020 Census
- Fresno - Black population, 2,426 (17.33%) in 2020 Census
- Galveston - Black population, 8,785 (16.36%) in 2020 Census
- Hempstead - Black population, 1,760 (32.41%) in 2020 Census
- Kendleton - Black population, 220 (64.10%) in 2020 Census
- Manvel - Black population, 2,661 (26.63%) in 2020 Census
- Missouri City - Black population, 30,146 (40.6%) in 2020 Census
- Prairie View - Black population, 6,712 (82.01%) in 2020 Census
- Spring, Texas - Black population, 15,492 (24.76%) in 2020 Census
- Pearland, Texas - Black population, 24,482 (19.46%) in 2020 Census
- Tamina
- Waller - Black population, 458 (17.08%) in 2020 Census
- Willis - Black population, 1,076 (16.73%) in 2020 Census

Killeen-Temple (Bell County)

- Killeen - Black population, 54,109 (35.34%) in 2020 Census
- Temple - Black population, 12,031 (14.66%) in 2020 Census
- Harker Heights - Black population, 7,198 (21.75%) in 2020 Census
- Copperas Cove - Black population, 6,431 (17.54%) in 2020 Census
- Fort Cavazos - Black population, 4,521 (16.00%) in 2020 Census

Northeast Texas

- Corsicana - Black population, 4,782 (19.04%) in 2020 Census
- Easton - Black population, 259 (51.9%) in 2020 Census
- Henderson - Black population, 3,052 (23.0%) in 2020 Census
- Jacksonville - Black population, 2,747 (19.63%) in 2020 Census
- Longview - Black population, 19,173 (23.49%) in 2020 Census
- Marshall - Black population, 8,368 (35.77%) in 2020 Census
- Mexia - Black population, 2,086 (30.26%) in 2020 Census
- Moore Station - Black population, 142 (88.75%) in 2020 Census
- Neylandville - Black population, 29 (43.28%) in 2020 Census
- Palestine - Black population, 4,439 (23.94%) in 2020 Census
- Scottsville - Black population, 138 (41.30%) in 2020 Census
- Texarkana - Black population, 13,565 (37.48%) in 2020 Census
- Toco - Black population, 56 (61.54%) in 2020 Census
- Tyler - Black population, 24,126 (22.76%) in 2020 Census

San Antonio

- Ellis Alley
- Pecan Valley
- East Side, San Antonio
- North East
- Dellcrest
- Eastwood
- Huntleigh Park
- Honey

San Antonio suburbs

- Cibolo - Black population, 5,017 (15.54%)
- Converse - Black population, 5,655 (20.59%)
- Kirby - Black population, 1,095 (13.45%)
- Lackland AFB - Black population, 1,762 (18.61%)
- Martinez - Black population, 5,855 (25.59%)
- Schertz - Black population, 4,821 (11.48%)
- Universal City - Black population, 1,880 (9.53%)

Wichita Falls

=== U.S. Virgin Islands ===
Majority of territory residents are of black/Afro-Caribbean descent.

=== Utah ===
Most of state's blacks concentrated in Hill Air Force Base near Ogden.

Historically, the diverse SugarHouse district of Salt Lake City.

=== Vermont ===
- Burlington – Old North End 4.7%

=== Virginia ===
Alexandria – Black population, at 31,314 (19.64%) in 2020 Census.

Arlington County – Black population, at 20,330 (8.52%) in 2020 Census.

- Arlington View
- Nauck
- Penrose
- High View Park

Charles City County – Black population, at 2,836 (41.87%) in 2020 Census.

- Charles City (50.96%)

Chase City - Mecklenburg County

Cheasapeake

- South Norfolk

Clarksville - Mecklenburg County

Courtland - Southampton County

Danville

Dendron (51.2%) - Surry County

Eastern counties of Virginia along Chesapeake Bay (Middle Peninsula). It encompasses six Virginia counties:

- Essex,
- Gloucester,
- King and Queen,
- King William,
- Mathews,
- and Middlesex.

Emporia (56.2%) - Greensville County

Franklin (52.3%)

Hampton

- Aberdeen Gardens
- Shell Road

Hopewell

Kenbridge - Lunenburg County

Lawrenceville (64.6%) - Brunswick County

Lynchburg

Martinsville

- Laurel Park (64.4%)
- Sandy Level (73.3%)

Nassawadox (54.9%) - Northampton County

Newport News

- Christopher Shores-Stuart Gardens
- East End

Norfolk

- Berkley
- Huntersville
- Little Africa, aka Little Manila or San Juan.
- Park Place
- Youngs Park

Petersburg

- Ettrick (75.1%)

Portsmouth

Richmond - Henrico County

- East Highland Park (79.4%)
- Highland Springs (51.8%)
- Jackson Ward
- Montrose

Roanoke

Smithfield - Isle of Wight County

- Rushmere (62.1%)

South Boston - Halifax County

South Hill - Mecklenburg County

- Brodnax
- La Crosse

Suffolk

Wakefield (51.3%) - Sussex County

Waverly (61.8%) - Sussex County

Williamsburg

Virginia Beach

- Beechwood
- Gracetown
- Mill Dam
- Reedtown
- Seatack

=== Washington ===
Federal Way

Parkland

- Lake City
- Park Lodge (central area)

Seatac

Seattle

- Atlantic
- Central District
- Columbia City
- High Point
- International District (more Chinese and Asian).
- Leschi
- Rainier Beach
- South Side (near Safeco Field).
- Yesler Terrace

Tacoma

- Hilltop
- Salishan

Tukwila – est.15–20%.

=== West Virginia ===
Institute

Keystone

Kimball

=== Wisconsin ===
Beloit

Brown Deer

Kenosha

Madison

- Burke Heights
- Burr Oaks
- Nobel Park
- Park Ridge
- Walnut Grove
- Wexford Ridge

Middleton

Milwaukee

- Ann Arbor
- Arlington Heights
- Avenues West
- Berryland
- Bronzeville
- Franklin Heights
- Grantosa Heights
- Havenwoods
- Harambee
- Hillside/Lapham Park
- Halyard Park
- Metcalfe Park
- Merrill Park
- Midtown
- North Division
- Parklawn
- Parkwest
- Rufus King
- Uptown
- Uptown Crossing
- Walnut Hill
- Washington Park
- Westlawn

Racine

== See also ==
- List of U.S. cities with large African American populations
- List of U.S. communities with African American majority populations
- List of U.S. metropolitan areas with large African-American populations
- List of U.S. states and territories by African-American population
- List of majority-Black counties in the United States
- List of U.S. cities with large Hispanic populations
- List of Indian reservations in the United States
