= Pecan (disambiguation) =

A pecan is a type of nut belonging to either of two species:

- Carya illinoinensis, the usual meaning of pecan
- Carya aquatica, bitter pecan, also called water hickory

The pecans are the four species of section Apocarya in the genus Carya, two of which are individually known as hickories

Pecan may also refer to:

== Places ==
In the United States

- Pecan, Georgia
- Pecan City, Georgia
- Pecan Acres, Texas
- Pecan Bayou (disambiguation)
- Pecan Gap, Texas
- Pecan Grove (disambiguation)
- Pecan Hill, Texas
- Pecan Park, Houston, a neighbourhood of Houston, Texas
- Pecan Plantation, Texas
- Pecan Valley, Texas

== Foods ==
- Pecan pie
- Pecan sandie

== Sports ==
- Pecan Bowl, a defunct college football game
