= Elmwood, Syracuse =

Elmwood & neighbors

Coordinates: 43.019°N 76.168°W

Elmwood is one of the 26 officially recognized neighborhoods of Syracuse, New York. It borders three other Syracuse neighborhoods, with Strathmore to the north, Brighton to the east, and North Valley to the south.

Elmwood Park was listed on the National Register of Historic Places in 2005.

== Sources ==
- City of Syracuse (Official Site) Neighborhoods
