= Winburn =

Winburn may refer to:

- Winburn, Lexington, a neighborhood in Lexington, Kentucky, United States

== People with the surname ==
- Anna Mae Winburn (1913–1999), American jazz singer and bandleader
- Ernie Winburn (1897–1953), American football player
- Roland Winburn (born 1946), American politician
- Patrick Winburn (born 1955), biographer of Winburn family lineage: William Wenbourne, Puritan Ancestor of Wenbourne, Winborne and Winburn in America
