= Hallmark (disambiguation) =

A hallmark is an official stamp of quality on a precious metal.

Hallmark may also refer to:

== Companies and institutions ==
- Hallmark Cards, a greeting card manufacturer based in Kansas City, Missouri
  - Hallmark Channel, an American cable television network owned by Crown Media Holdings, a privately owned subsidiary of Hallmark Cards
    - Hallmark Channel (international)
      - Hallmark Channel (Australia)
      - Hallmark Channel (Italy)
      - Hallmark Channel (UK)
- Hallmark Connections, a British coach operator
- Hallmark Guitars, an American guitar manufacturer
- Hallmark Institute of Photography, a for-profit school in Turners Falls, Massachusetts, open 1975–2016
- Hallmark Records, a British record label
- Halcyon Studios, a Hallmark Channel stakeholder previously known as Hallmark Entertainment

== Software ==
- Hallmark Connections Card Studio

== People ==
- Charlotte Hallmark, Cherokee American politician and chief
- Roger Hallmark (1946–2014), American country singer-songwriter

== Other uses ==
- Hallmark, Louisville, a small neighborhood in western Louisville, Kentucky, USA
- Hallmark-Sonali Bank Loan Scam, a corruption scandal in the Bangladesh
- Hallmark Academy, a home school education in Sanger, California
- Hallmark Building, a historic building in Hollywood, California
- Hall Mark (horse), an Australian racehorse active in the 1930s
