= John Gridley House =

Historic house in New York, United States

- U.S. National Register of Historic Places
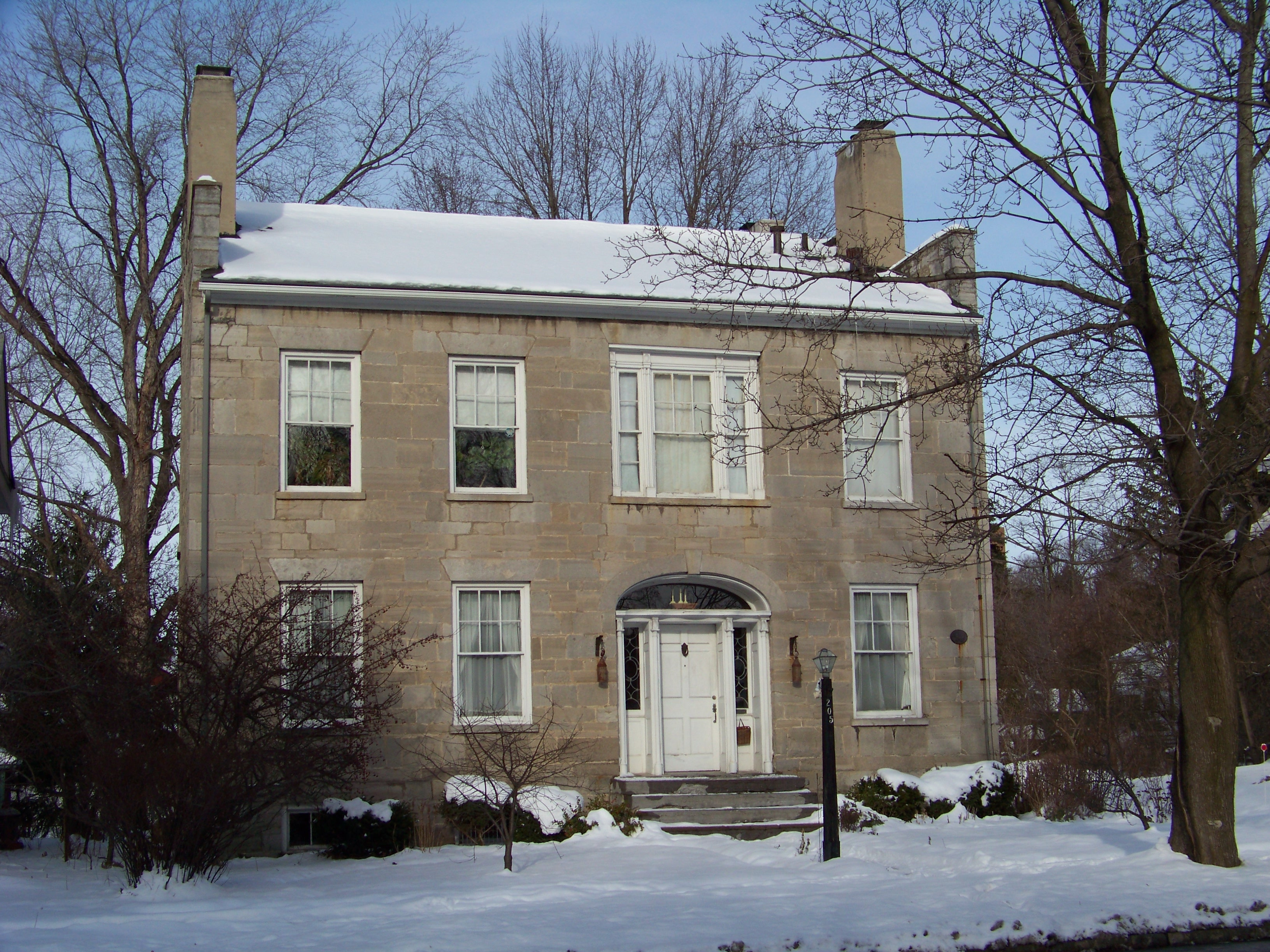

- Location within New York Location within the United States
- Location: 207 E. Seneca Tnpk., Syracuse, New York
- Coordinates: 43°0′2″N 76°8′24″W
- Built: c. 1812
- Architectural style: Federal
- NRHP reference No.: 77000969
- Added to NRHP: August 16, 1977

The John Gridley House is located in the southern section of Syracuse, New York. This section of Syracuse was originally known as Onondaga Hollow, and was settled thirty years before the City of Syracuse. The John Gridley House is significant as one of few houses remaining of the original Onondaga Hollow settlement. The two storey Federal style house was built around 1812 of local limestone. It was added to the National Register of Historic Places in 1977.

The house was built by the same stonemasons who built the Gen. Hutchinson House on Onondaga Hill, several miles away along the same route, the Seneca Turnpike. In 2010 a historic plaque was placed in front of the house.

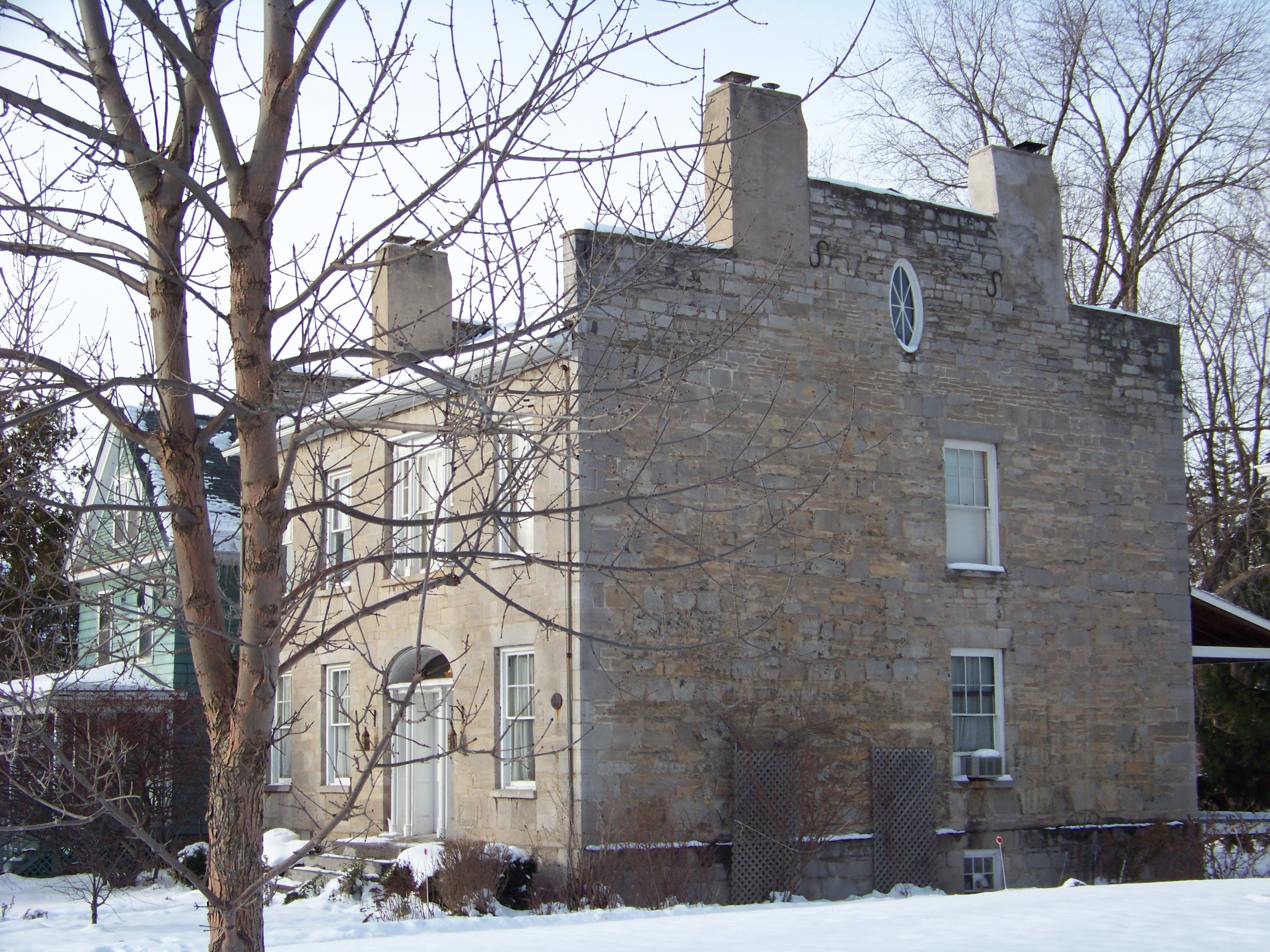
Eastern end of the house

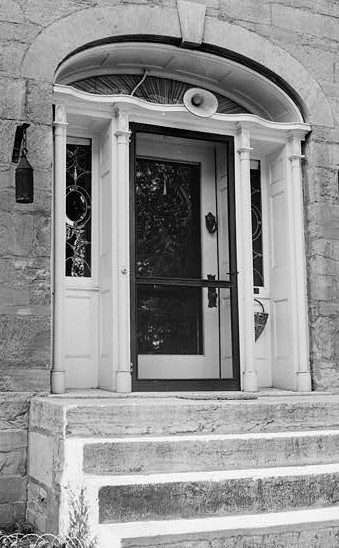
Entrance as it was in 1936

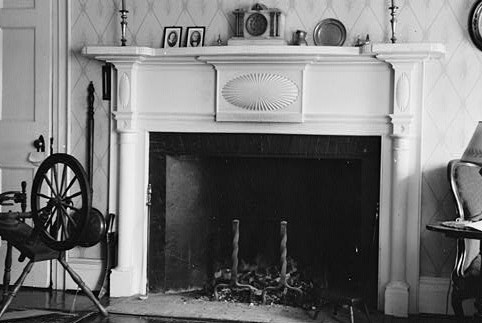
Fireplace in the parlor

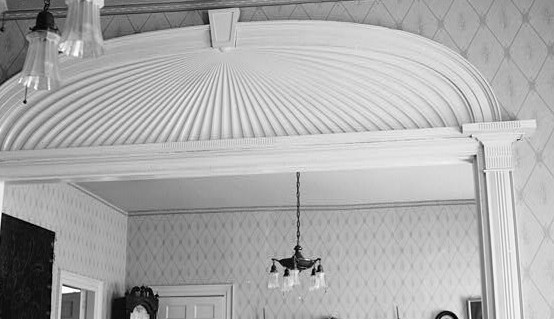
Archway between parlor and sitting room
