= Griffytown, Louisville =

Neighborhood in Louisville, Kentucky

Griffytown, Louisville, Kentucky Griffeytown, Griffithtown
- Unincorporated
- Interactive map of Griffytown, Louisville, Kentucky
- Coordinates: 38°15′05″N 85°32′32″W
- Established: 1879
- Founder: Dan Griffith

Griffytown is a neighborhood of Louisville, Kentucky established in 1879 in unincorporated Jefferson County, along Old Harrods Creek Road. Streets within its boundaries include: Bellewood Road, Robert Road, Church Lane, Lincoln Way, Cox Lane, Malcolm Avenue, Plainview Avenue and Booker Road. It has also been known as Griffeytown, and Griffithtown. It has a historical marker presented by African American Heritage Committee, Inc. of Louisville and Jefferson County.

== History ==
In 1879, a freed African-American slave named Dan Griffith, purchased a cabin from Minor White, an early Middletown settler. Griffith moved it to the land he had been living on along Old Harrods Creek Road, and the neighborhood appears to be named for him.

From its beginnings through the mid-1970s, Griffytown had a very rural character with primarily small, shotgun-style homes, dirt roads, backyard gardens and small farms. The majority of these houses had no indoor plumbing. During those early years, up until the end of World War II, many of its residents were maids, cooks, butlers, chauffeurs, and gardeners for the wealthy white families of nearby Anchorage and Middletown.

The neighborhood was redeveloped in the 1970s through urban renewal and many dilapidated houses were demolished, remaining homes had indoor plumbing and bathrooms installed, and new homes were built on the vacant lots. It remains a predominantly African American community, although a number of families of other races live there as well. The Louisville and Jefferson County African American Heritage Committee placed a historical marker near 401 Old Harrods Creek Road, designating the southwest boundary.

== See also ==
- Berrytown, Louisville
