= Newtown (Palatka) =

Black neighborhood in Palatka, Florida, US

Newtown is a neighborhood of Palatka, Florida located west of downtown and includes portions of the central business district. The neighborhood was originally established as an African American community in the mid-1800s. Central Academy, Florida's first accredited African American high school, is located in the area.

== See also ==
- List of African American neighborhoods
