= Gift of Peace AIDS Hospice =

AIDS hospice founded by Mother Teresa

- Formation: November 8, 1986; 39 years ago
- Founder: St. Mother Teresa of Calcutta
- Type: AIDS Hospice
- Headquarters: 2800 Otis St. NE; Washington, D.C. 20018
- Website: Website

The Gift of Peace AIDS Hospice is an AIDS hospice care home that was opened in 1986 by Mother Teresa and the Missionaries of Charity in Northeast Washington, D.C.

== History ==
On November 8, 1986, Mother Teresa and Archbishop James Aloysius Hickey formally dedicated the new AIDS hospice facility in a building owned by the Archdiocese of Washington. The facility included multiple wings and dormitory accommodations for up to fifteen men and women with AIDS.

The AIDS hospice received support from the Georgetown University Medical Center, with their doctors visiting the home weekly to conduct health screening and assessments of all incoming residents. The hospice facility was staffed by around 50 volunteers who cooked for, bathed, and cared for the patients.

At the time of its opening, the facility was the largest of the over 600 houses and services throughout the world founded by the Missionaries of Charity. Between 1986 and 1998, over 240 men and women died at the hospice service.

=== Public reception ===
When the AIDS hospice program was first announced in August 1986, it faced criticism and opposition from hundreds of local Washington, D.C. residents. Because of fears and misconceptions about HIV/AIDS during the period, most fears were related to the virus being transmitted through the air and posing a threat to them and their children. Some residents also expressed concern that the organization was an "unregulated medical facility" and would lower local property values, and others opposed the service because it was caring for homosexual men.

== Present activity ==
As of 2010, the HIV/AIDs hospice service still is offered on a limited basis, and the facility is now open to other individuals with terminal illnesses seeking care.
