= Onondaga Hollow, New York =

Coordinates: 43°0′5″N 76°8′54″W

Onondaga Hollow, also known as Onondaga Valley, was a village in Onondaga County, New York, from 1784 to 1926. It was the first county seat and one of the most prominent settlements in the early years of European inhabitation in the region. The village was annexed into the city of Syracuse, New York, in 1926, and today makes up the southernmost portion (North Valley and South Valley).
