= East End/Valley Street Neighborhood =

Coordinates: 35°35′29″N 82°32′43″W

The East End/Valley Street Neighborhood is the oldest and most historically significant African-American neighborhood in Asheville, North Carolina, US. The neighborhood contains historical markers, churches, schools, parks, businesses and buildings listed on the National Register of Historic Places.

== History ==
The neighborhood has been a vibrant Black community since the 1880s, although African American presence there dates back to the earliest times of slavery in western North Carolina. The neighborhood flourished through the first half of the twentieth century, even as the practices of urban renewal began in the city in the 1950s. Since the mid-20th century, the East End/Valley Street Neighborhood, along with its schools, businesses and churches, has served as a center for Black culture and education for the entire region.

Before urban renewal reshaped the neighborhood in the 1970s, it covered the area from Eagle Street down a hill to what is now the broad, tree-lined section of South Charlotte Street (then called Valley Street.) It climbed up Beaucatcher Mountain, and down to McCormick Field. It is the neighborhood that Asheville resident Thomas Wolfe referred to when he wrote of his days as a newspaper boy around 1914: "Fat ropes of language in the dusk, the larded sizzle of frying fish, the sad faint twanging of a banjo, and the stamp, far-faint, of heavy feet; voices Nilotic, river-wailing, and the greasy light of four thousand smoky lamps in shack and tenement. … Rich wells of laughter bubbled everywhere".

== The Block ==
In its heyday, the neighborhood's most socially vibrant component was The Block, a buzzing residential and commercial district for Black residents. It was home to numerous black-owned businesses, including doctors, lawyers, dentists, pharmacists, architects, builders, restaurateurs, and literary scholars who had attended prestigious Ivy League institutions.

During the 1950s, The Block's juke joints were a destination for headliners like Louis Armstrong, but beginning later in that decade and through the 1980s, businesses were pushed out or closed due to suburbanization. But thanks to local efforts, Asheville's historic strip is buzzing again, with a mix of people and places that bring its remarkable past into the present.

== The YMI ==
Just as The Block was the centerpiece of the neighborhood, the Young Men's Institute was the buzzing hub of The Block. Completed in 1893, the YMI was the center for social activity in the community where it supported professional offices, a public library and the YMI Orchestra. Now called the YMI Cultural Center, it stands as the oldest Black cultural center in the U.S.

The 18,000 square foot Tudor-style structure was built by and for the several hundred African-American craftsmen who helped construct and furnish the Biltmore House. The YMI Cultural Center building is now listed on the National Register of Historic Places.

== Martin Luther King Jr Park ==
The neighborhood is home to a 3.4-acre park dedicated to the memory of civil rights icon Martin Luther King Jr. Situated at 50 Martin Luther King Jr Drive, the park offers various amenities including a lighted ballfield with a scoreboard, a concession stand, a fitness court, picnic tables, a playground, restrooms, an open shelter, a memorial statue, a courtyard, and free-use grills.

The park is open to all, and often lies at the center of community events. This makes it a great place to feel more connected to the history of the local area.

== Stephens-Lee High School/Recreation Center ==
The neighborhood's Stephens-Lee High School holds a significant place in the history of African-American education in Western North Carolina. Established in 1923, it was the main secondary school for African-Americans in the region, until it closed in 1965 following integration. However, the gymnasium was converted to a community center in the 1970s, and the Stephens-Lee Recreation Center remains active today.

Stephens-Lee is located on what was once called Catholic Hill and the building, often referred to as "The Castle on the Hill," was designed by Asheville architect Ronald Greene. It opened on March 7, 1923, with a capacity of 900 students.

In 1991, a reunion for Stephens-Lee's alumni was held at the center. Expected to attract 100 people, nearly 800 showed up – some from as far away as Hawaii. While sharing memories and talking about friends who died, the importance of preserving the school's legacy took on greater urgency. The Stephens-Lee Alumni Association became a nonprofit organization with a mission to keep alive the school's principles by hosting reunions and granting scholarships. One scholarship recipient, Terry Bellamy, became the first Black mayor of Asheville.

== St. Matthias Episcopal Church ==
The neighborhood's St. Matthias Episcopal Church is a parish of the Episcopal Church, which welcomed free blacks in North Carolina in 1832. St. Matthias was founded in 1865 as the Freedmen's Church and is believed to be the oldest African-American congregation in Asheville. It is inclusive and multicultural. In 1870, the church founded the city's first school for African-Americans. It was renamed Trinity Chapel in 1872 and became St. Matthias in 1894, when construction of the current brick structure was begun. The church was listed on the National Register of Historic Places in 1979.

== East End/Valley Street Neighborhood Association ==
Since 2010, a reestablished End End/Valley Street Neighborhood Association has been working with businesses and residents old and new to preserve the neighborhood's historically rich African-American heritage. Renée White, who has served as association president for 10 years, leads the organization and its hardworking members to ensure that the neighborhood and its residents are actively involved in any decisions affecting their future. The association's motto boldly proclaims, "The East End Is Rising!”
