= Salishan, Tacoma, Washington =

Coordinates: 47°13′03″N 122°24′27″W

Salishan is a neighborhood of Tacoma, Washington that was originally created as a World War II housing project but, starting in 2002, has been demolished and rebuilt into a new neighborhood of homes, apartments, services, and parks on new infrastructure. It is located on Tacoma's eastside.

== Creation ==
The federal government created the community of Salishan during World War II to house workers in the area's wartime industries and military personnel, and their families. It was planned to have 2,000 units (1,600 permanent residencies plus 400 temporary ones). This plan was similar to the ones that created communities in Seattle and King County during this same time.

The Salishan project was plagued by difficulties common during the war. Trees from the original property were used, but difficulties arose due to limited labor and war-related delays. The sewer system was delivered late, and at one point a snowstorm brought progress to a complete halt. However, on 1 May 1943, over 600 families moved into the new development. At that time, Salishan was almost as large as the nearby community of Puyallup, then a small farming community. Problems continued, however, in the form of poor telephone service and archaic appliances. Additionally, the sudden increase in population put a strain on the Tacoma Public Schools, putting the Salishan School at more than double its capacity. Salishan was notable from the outset in ways that have continued to be true. At a time when the nation's housing market was thoroughly segregated by race, Salishan was racially integrated on purpose. In addition, after the Vietnam War, Salishan also became an important gateway community for new Americans. By the time Salishan was demolished in 2002 to make way for its redevelopment, its residents were about 25% Vietnamese, 25% Cambodian, and about 13% African-American. New Salishan remains one of the regions' neighborhoods most diverse by race, language, national origin, income, homeowner-renter, age, ability and disability.

== Post-War boom ==
By the end of the War, the federal government transferred Salishan to the Tacoma Housing Authority. From that time to the present, Salishan has been an important part of the City of Tacoma's supply of affordable housing. Even during the war, Salishan's population included many low-income families. Despite the wartime boom in the shipyard industry, 12 percent of Salishan families relied on public assistance, which would eventually lead to increasing post-war poverty rates.

The demand for Salishan housing increased after VJ Day as veterans returned home. Federal legislation extended the life of the temporary wartime developments. However, faced with the growing concern of poverty, the military instituted a minimum income requirement, resulting in lower-income military personnel being denied entry into the Salishan community. Crime also became an increasing problem, leading some bus drivers to refuse to drive into the Salishan area without plainclothes police officers on board to avoid harassment. In addition, the diverse community began to see early indications of racial tensions. In 1949, the Boy Scouts of America attempted to organize racially separated troops in the Salishan area. However, black voters rejected the idea, resulting in the formation of the first integrated Scout troop in the Tacoma area.

Despite the crime problems, Salishan was recognized as a center for cultural events. The Sunday edition of the Tacoma News Tribune lauded Salishan for being a "lesson in enterprise and thinking," with a large range of cultural activities available to residents. Salishan's population continued to grow. In 1950, a population of 6,700 was reached, of which nearly half were children. In attempts to create a utopian community environment, business-sponsored home beautification contests in the area. Despite this, Salishan remained a fairly poor area, which eventually led to its conversion to a low-income housing area.

== Conversion to low-income housing ==
By the early 1950s, Salishan's income was hovering at around $1,900 per year (approximately $16,000 as of March 2006). This led to increasing pressure on the Tacoma Housing Authority to convert Salishan to a low-income housing property. This was met with opposition from the local real estate industry, which feared that Salishan being converted to a low-income area would harm the house prices in the surrounding areas. In addition, the industry argued that there was little need, with around half of the housing units unoccupied. However, on 24 May 1951, the Tacoma City Council voted to convert 900 units to low-income housing and demolish the rest.

In the mid-1950s the community's "center" was Hogan's grocery store/drugstore/variety store/soda fountain in a large building on East 44th St. Incorporated in the drugstore segment was a soda fountain bar with the old-style cushioned, spinning stools the length of the bar. This building, located across the parking lot from the Tacoma Housing Authority administration and maintenance facility, went through a variety of iterations to serve the community. In the later 1950s, after the grocery store complex was replaced by the Piggly Wiggly complex at 40th & Portland Avenue, the building became a distribution center for the distribution of government commodities such as cheese, powdered milk, canned meat, flour, sugar, etc. More changes up into the 1990s included it becoming the Eastside Neighborhood Center and numerous other offices for community services.

The conversion to low-income housing increased the minority population, a trend that continued throughout the years. It has also been an important "first home" for families immigrating to America. By 2000, for example, approximately half of the Salishan families were first-generation Americans. By 1955, one-third of Salishan's population consisted of people of color. A non-discrimination policy had long been in place by the Tacoma Housing Authority. As the immigrant and minority populations increased, so did poverty rates. Salishan increasingly became known as unsafe. With incomes only increasing modestly, crime rates in Salishan gradually rose over the next few decades.

== Salishan in the 1990s ==
By the late 1980s, Salishan had become a center for gang activity and drug trading and was increasingly viewed as burdensome by residents of Tacoma. Residents of the areas around Salishan, which had always been more middle-class, complained that the neighborhood was negatively affecting property prices, crime rates, and perception of the rest of the lower east side. In 1990, Salishan reported 331 violent crimes, for a rate of nearly one per day, for a rate of approximately 5,517 violent crimes per 100,000 population relative to Tacoma's overall rate of 433 per 100,000. Increasing news coverage ensued, and the already strong calls for revitalization strengthened and broadened to include activists from Tacoma neighborhoods far away from Salishan.

Community leaders organized youth activities and educational programs in hopes of reducing crime rates. These efforts were largely successful and encouraged external charitable investment in the Salishan area. By 1996, violent crime rates had dropped to approximately 2,883 per 100,000, a rate nearly half of that only six years ago. Although the rate remained several times that of Tacoma's overall rate, an increasing perception of a revitalized Salishan became popular. In 1996, Washington State University opened the Salishan Learning Center, where local students could earn credits toward a bachelor's degree.

== New Salishan ==
By 2000, Salishan's revitalization was common knowledge. Its reputation as an unsafe neighborhood continued. By the time it was demolished, Salishan was a well-organized neighborhood of families who were very fond of it. However, the housing and the infrastructure were worn out. In April 2001, the Tacoma Housing Authority (THA) received a $35 million HOPE VI grant to revitalize Salishan. THA devised a $225 million full redevelopment plan. As of 2015, the plan has demolished all of the housing except for eleven original homes kept and refurbished as historic preservation. THA has built a new mixed-income neighborhood of about 1,400 dwelling units, both single-family homes for sale and apartments for rent. THA used three homebuilders: Quadrant Homes, D.R. Horton and Tacoma-Pierce County Habitat for Humanity. The community includes two 55 unit buildings that are reserved for seniors. The first of these is International Place, owned and managed by the Korean Women's Association. The other is Salishan Gardens, owned and managed by American Baptist Homes of the West. Salishan also has its own elementary school, the new Lister Elementary School. The commercial core has the region's largest primary health care and dental clinic, the Kimi and Dr. George Tanbara Clinic, built and operated by Community Health Care. The commercial core is still unfinished. Plans call for a public library, a grocery store, a child care center, a credit union, office and programming space for nonprofit education and training services and community space. All this will be on brand new infrastructure. New Salishan was built for walkers and children, with extensive green belts through and surrounding the neighborhood. The project has won national awards for its housing design, neighborhood design, affordability and environmental innovation. In addition, MetroParks is planning a large new athletic facility on Salishan's southern border next to the new First Creek Middle School. Between August 2019 and January 2020 there were 3 major shootings in Salishan, with a total of two people killed and five people injured.

== Demographics ==
Salishan remains an important part of the City of Tacoma's portfolio of affordable housing. The following statistics are derived from the 2000 US Census and relate to the two Census block groups that primarily cover Salishan. For the purposes of this section, these block groups will be referred to as "Salishan," even though they are not recognized by any specific name by the Census and do not conform entirely to any official border of Salishan. Measures based on medians have been converted to averages, which may distort the information, but it is likely approximate to the median values.

Salishan's percentage of households containing children with no female householder present was 336% higher than the state average.

As of the census of 2010, there were 2,447 people, 747 households, and 630 families residing in Salishan. There were 788 housing units. The racial makeup of Salishan was 33.7% White, 23.0% African American, 2.1% Native American, 21.0% Asian (8.3% Vietnamese, 7.1% Cambodian, 2.4% Korean, 0.9% Filipino, 0.2% Chinese, 0.2% Asian Indian, 0.2% Laotian, 0.1% Thai), 2.2% Pacific Islander (1.7% Samoan, 0.2% Native Hawaiian), 3.1% from other races, and 14.9% from two or more races. 10.9% of the population was Hispanic or Latino of any race (6.4% Mexican, 3.1% Puerto Rican, 0.3% Cuban).

There were 817 households, 69.4% of which had children under the age of 18 living with them, 38.2% were married couples living together, 43.2% had a female householder with no husband present, and 13.2% were non-families. 11.8% of all households were made up of individuals, and 4.8% had someone living alone who was 65 years of age or older. The average household size was 3.44 and the average family size was 3.72.

In Salishan, the population was spread out, with 46.2% under the age of 18, 6.4% from 18 to 24, 12.7% from 25 to 44, 17.6% from 45 to 64, and 4.8% who were 65 years of age or older. The median age was 21 years. For every 100 females, there were 78.1 males. For every 100 females age 18 and over, there were 65.7 males.

The median income for a household in Salishan was approximately $13,746, and the median income for a family was unavailable. Income by sex was also unavailable, as was per capita income. 57.4% of the population was below the poverty line. Family poverty statistics were unavailable. Out of the total population, 64.5% of those under the age of 18 and 52.6% of those 65 and older were living below the poverty line.

The neighborhood is part of the larger East Tacoma region, which had a population of 30,679. The racial makeup was 53.2% White or Caucasian, 13% Black or African American, 4.6% Native American, 13.2% Asian, 1.3% Pacific Islander and 6.8% Mixed Race. Hispanic or Latino of any race were 13% of the population. 22.3% of the population was below the poverty line.
