= Burrville (Washington, D.C.) =

Neighborhood located in Washington, D.C.

Coordinates: 38.8999°N 76.9225°W

- Neighborhood of Washington, D.C.
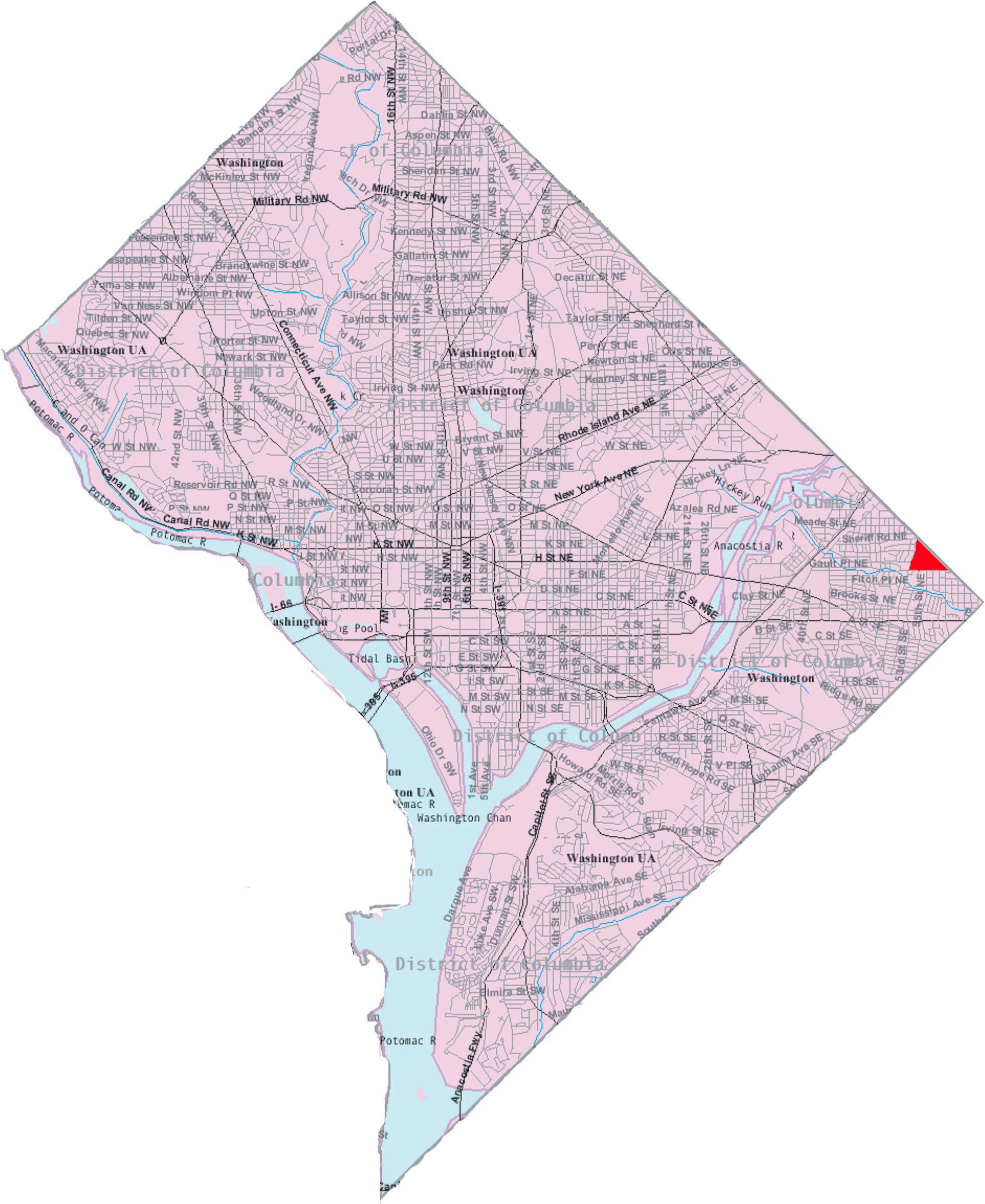
- Burrville within the District of Columbia
- Country: United States
- District: Washington, D.C.
- Ward: Ward 7

Government
  - Councilmember: Wendell Felder

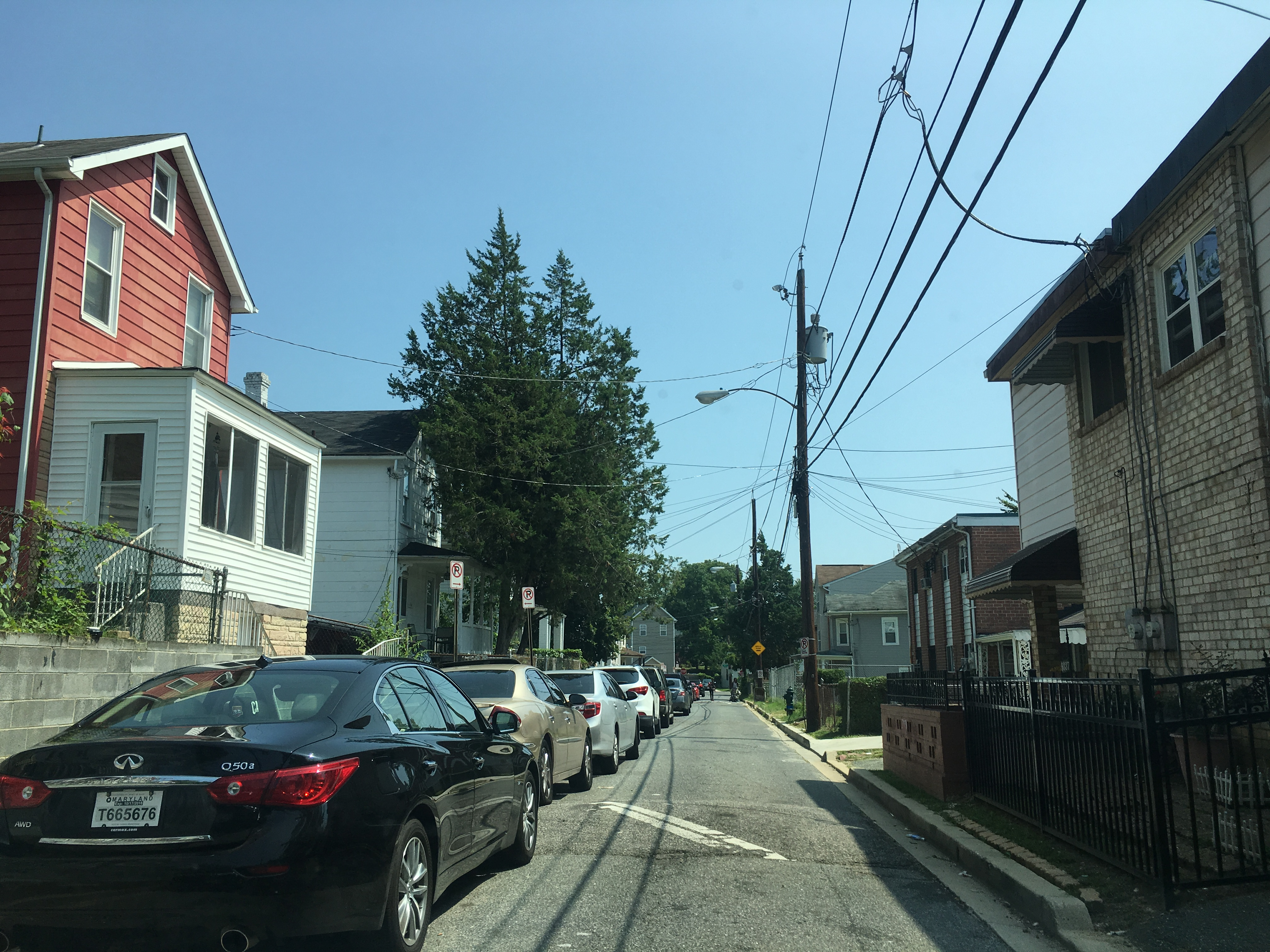
Burrville neighborhood at the intersection of Gay St. and 54th Pl. in August 2018

Burrville is a neighborhood located in Northeast Washington, D.C., east of the Anacostia River.

It is triangular in area, bounded by Nannie Helen Burroughs Avenue to the south, Division Avenue to the northwest, and Eastern Avenue to the northeast.
