= Pecan Bayou =

Pecan Bayou may refer to:

- Pecan Bayou (Colorado River tributary), located in west-central Texas
- Pecan Bayou (Red River tributary), located in northeastern Texas
