= Brighton, Syracuse =

Neighborhood in New York, United States

Coordinates: 43°1′17″N 76°9′5″W

Southside (also called Brighton) is one of the 26 official neighborhoods in Syracuse, New York.

South Salina Street (U.S. Route 11) and Midland Avenue run north–south through the neighborhood. The South Salina Street Historic District is listed on the National Register of Historic Places.

Onondaga Creek runs through the area to the west and Interstate 81 borders the area to the east.

Schools in the neighborhood include McKinley–Brighton Elementary School, Danforth Middle School, and the William R. Beard School. The high school serving the area is Corcoran High School located in nearby Strathmore. Parks include 33-acre Kirk Park (which abuts Onondaga Park) and McKinley Park.

== Midland sewage treatment plant ==
The neighborhood is the site of the Midland Avenue Regional Treatment Facility. Onondaga County announced the planned construction in 1999 to comply with a 1998 court order to reduce the amount of sewage entering Onondaga Lake. Construction began in 2005. As of 2010 the plant is in operation.

== History ==
Today's Southside includes the village of Danforth, which was incorporated from 1874 to 1887 before it was annexed by the city of Syracuse. The village was named in honor of early Onondaga County settler Asa Danforth. The Onondaga people are indigenous to the area.

The South Salina Street Historic District was listed on the National Register of Historic Places in 1986.
