= East Little Rock =

Neighborhood of Little Rock, Arkansas, United States

Coordinates: 34°43′51″N 92°14′40″W

Predominantly industrial in development, East Little Rock generally refers to most portions of the city of Little Rock, Arkansas located east of Interstate 30. The low-lying easternmost end of Arkansas' capital city is marked by distribution facilities and warehouses, Little Rock National Airport and its environs, the Port of Little Rock, and various manufacturers. A small number of residential areas can also be found dispersed throughout East Little Rock, progressing towards census-designated places including College Station and Sweet Home.

Physically and economically, East Little Rock often contrasts sharply with the newest, westernmost neighborhoods of Little Rock. The two parts of the city are linked via Interstate 630, which has its first west-bound access near East 15th Street.

Part of East Little Rock has received tremendous attention since the late 2004 opening of the William J. Clinton Presidential Center and Park near the banks of the Arkansas River. Development and subsequent opening of the facility and its adjoining Clinton School of Public Service, affiliated with the University of Arkansas, has served as a catalyst in plans to further improve its immediate area along the riverfront and downtown's River Market District. The next major addition for East Little Rock, the new headquarters of Heifer International adjacent to the Clinton library campus, opened on January 30, 2006.
