= Berrytown, Louisville =

Neighborhood in Louisville, Kentucky

Berrytown
- Neighborhood
- Interactive map of Berrytown
- Coordinates: 38.2692°N 85.5191°W
- Country: United States
- State: Kentucky
- County: Jefferson County
- City: Louisville
- Named for: Alfred Berry (settler)

Berrytown is a neighborhood of Louisville, Kentucky, United States, which has historically been a predominantly African-American community. Its location is centered along English Station Road, on the eastern boundary of the city of Anchorage, Kentucky.

== History ==
The neighborhood was founded in the 1870s during the Reconstruction era, after the American Civil War. The trustees of the Little Flock Church (also known as the First Colored Baptist Church) in Anchorage purchased the earliest parcels of land. It area is named for Alfred Berry, an early settler who bought a 10-acre (40,000 m^{2}) parcel in 1874. The neighborhood was once composed of numerous servants of the wealthy residents of nearby Anchorage.

The community still is predominantly African-American. Urban renewal redevelopment was planned for the neighborhood in the 1960s, but eventually only expanded the southern part due to resistance by residents.

== See also ==
- Griffytown, Louisville
