= Leinkauf Historic District =

Historic district in Alabama, United States

- U.S. National Register of Historic Places
- U.S. Historic district
- Location within Mobile, Alabama Location within Alabama Location within the United States
- Location: Roughly bounded by Government, S. Monterey, Eslava, Lamar, and S. Monterey Sts., Mobile, Alabama
- Coordinates: 30°40′38.49″N 88°4′24.55″W
- Area: 110 acres (45 ha)
- Built: 1840
- Architectural style: Late 19th And 20th Century Revivals, Late Victorian
- NRHP reference No.: 87000936
- Added to NRHP: June 24, 1987

The Leinkauf Historic District is a historic district in the city of Mobile, Alabama, United States. It was placed on the National Register of Historic Places on June 24, 1987. It is roughly bounded by Government, Eslava, Lamar, and Monterey Streets. The district covers 1,100 acres (4.5 km^{2}) and contains 303 contributing buildings. The buildings range in age from the 1820s to early 20th century and cover a variety of 19th- and 20th-century architectural styles.

Examples of architecture within the Leinkauf Historic District

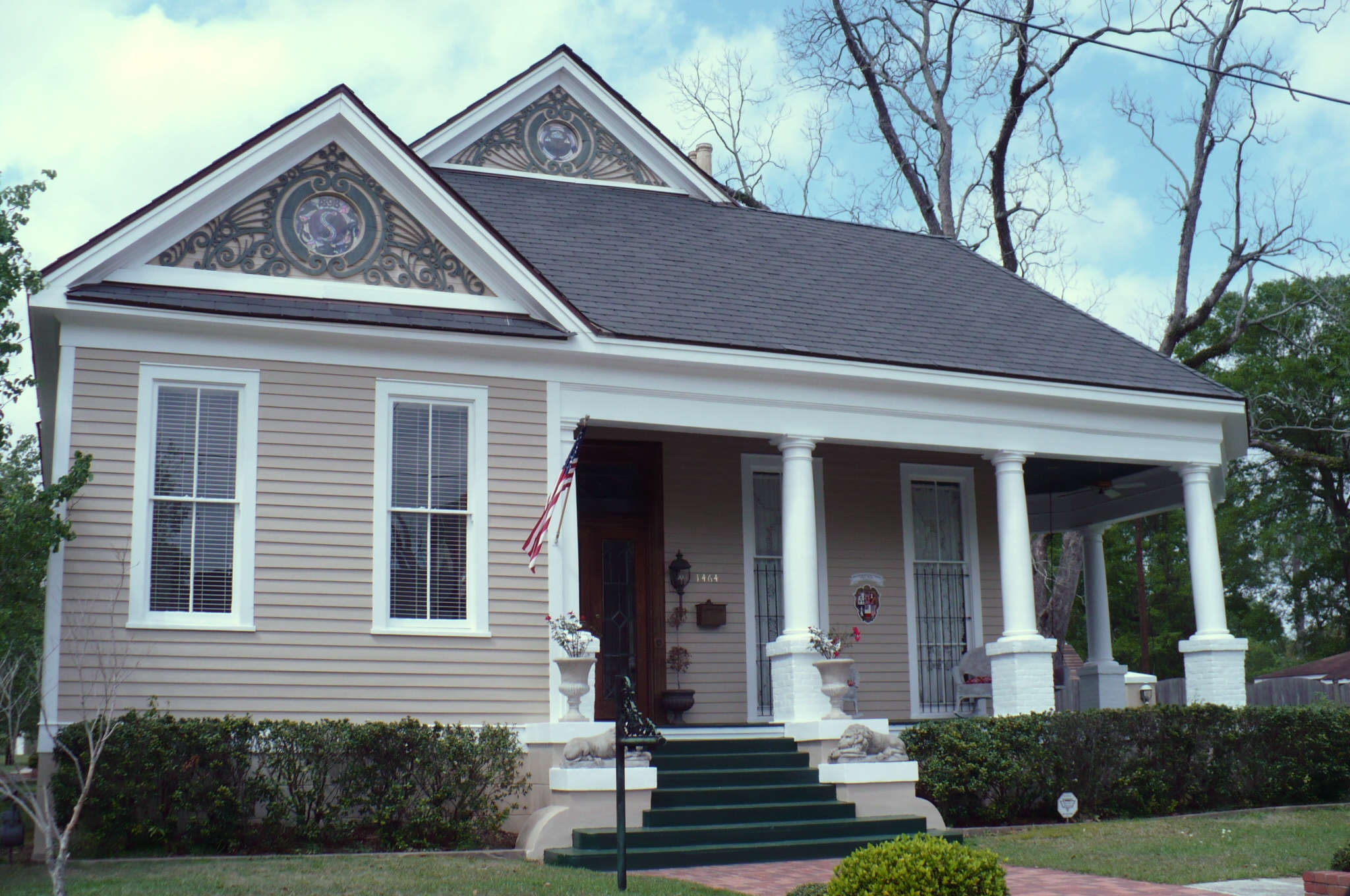
1464 Church Street

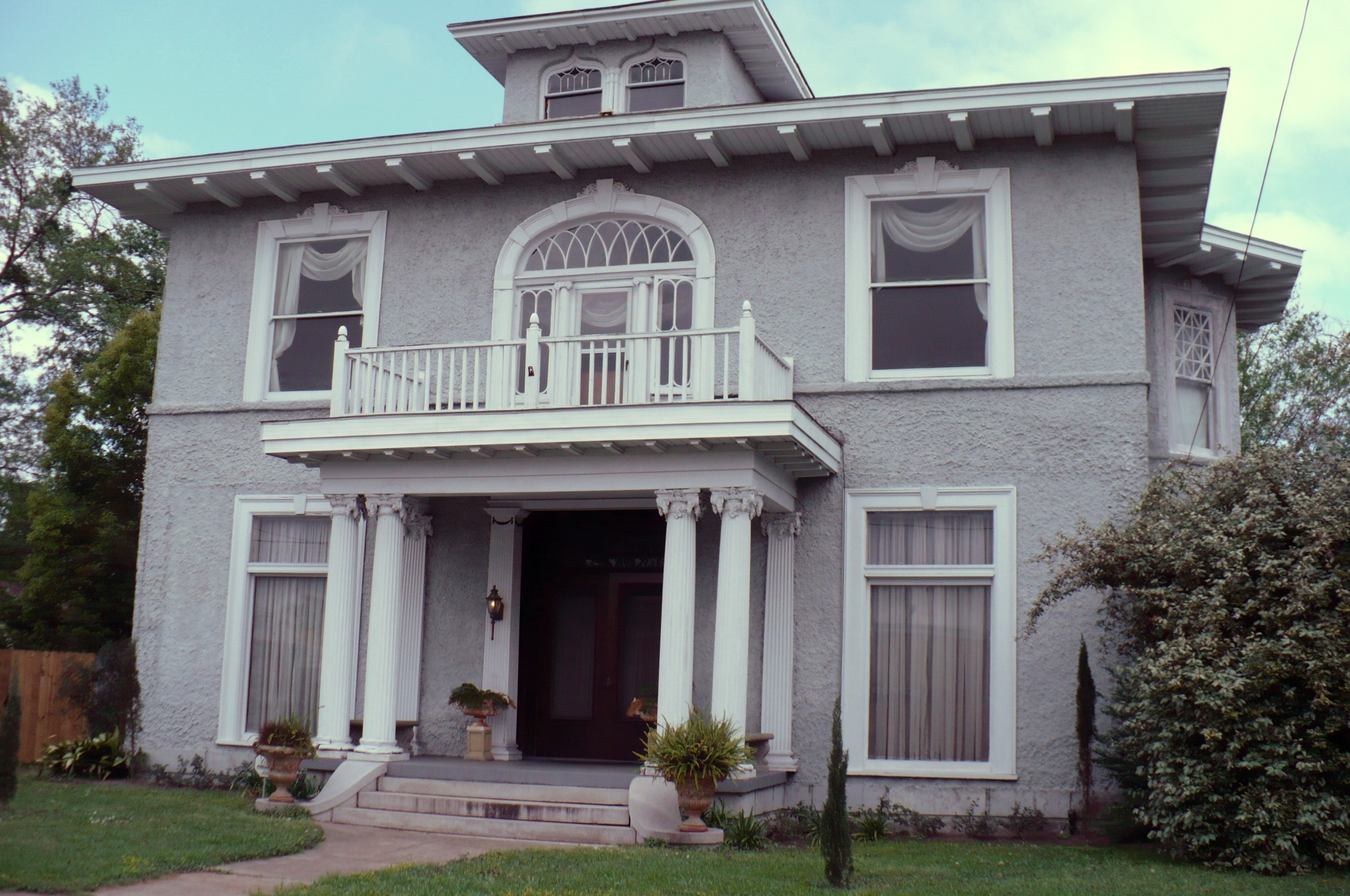
159 Michigan Avenue

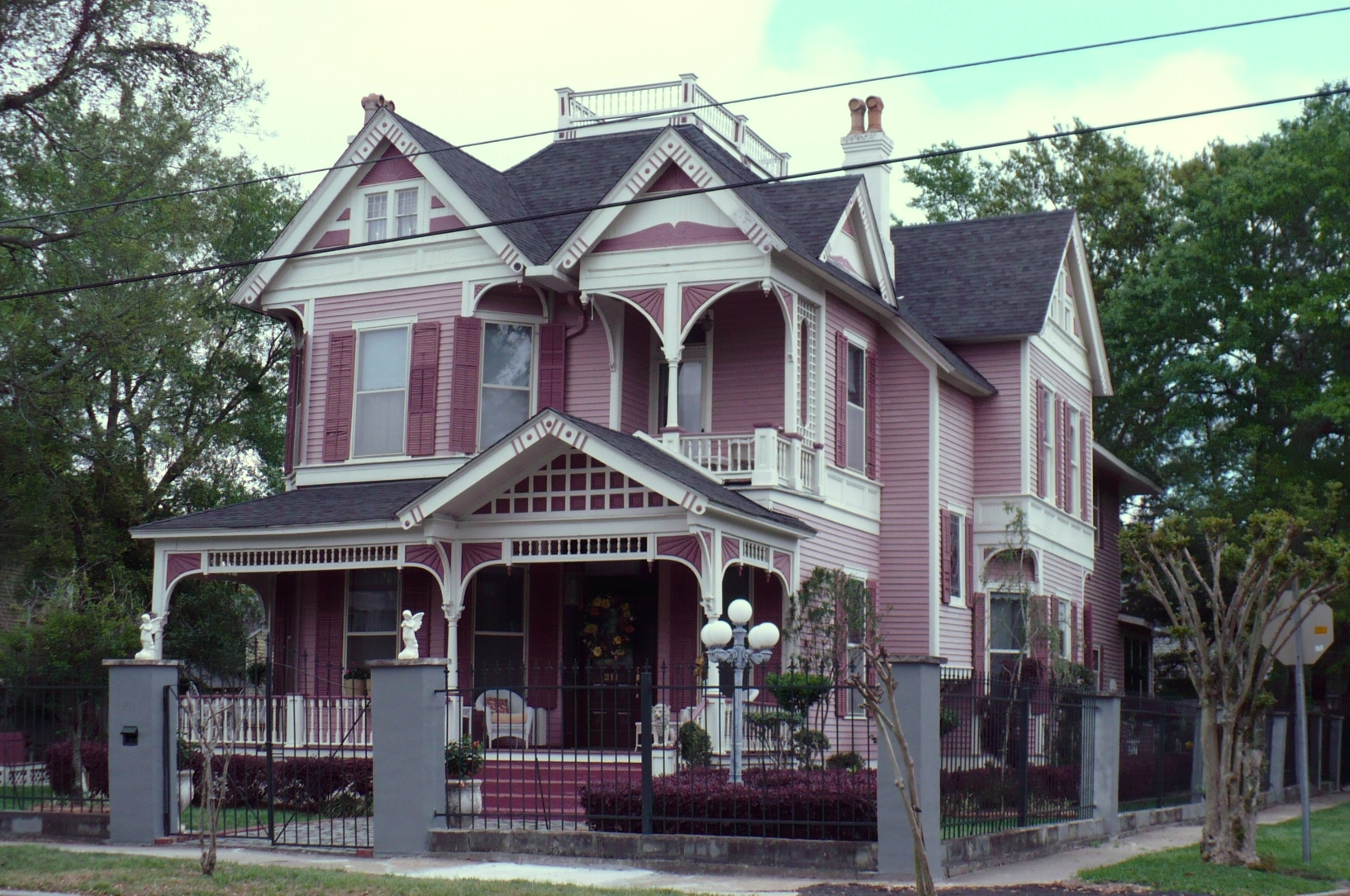
211 Michigan Avenue

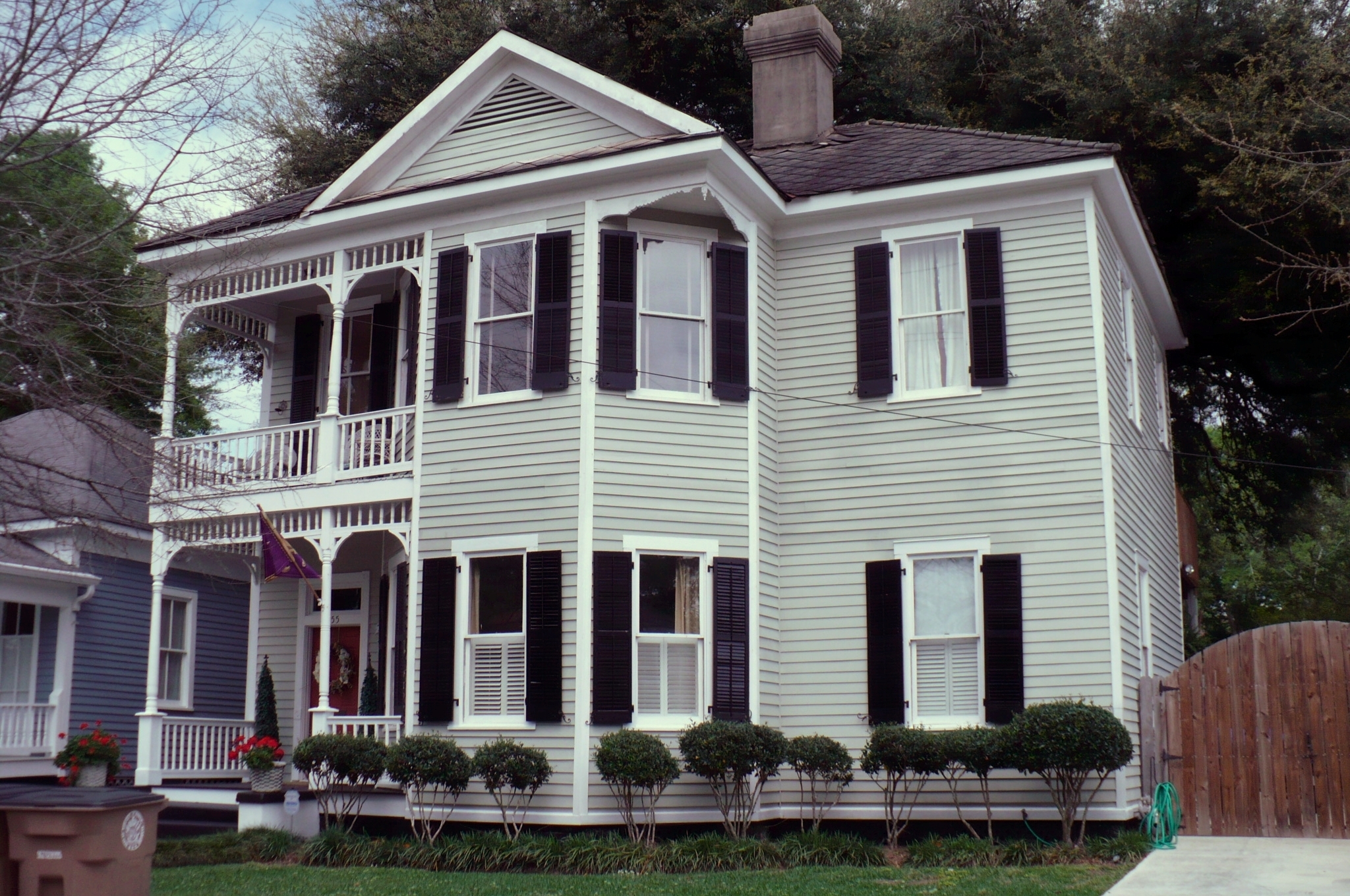
255 Dexter Avenue

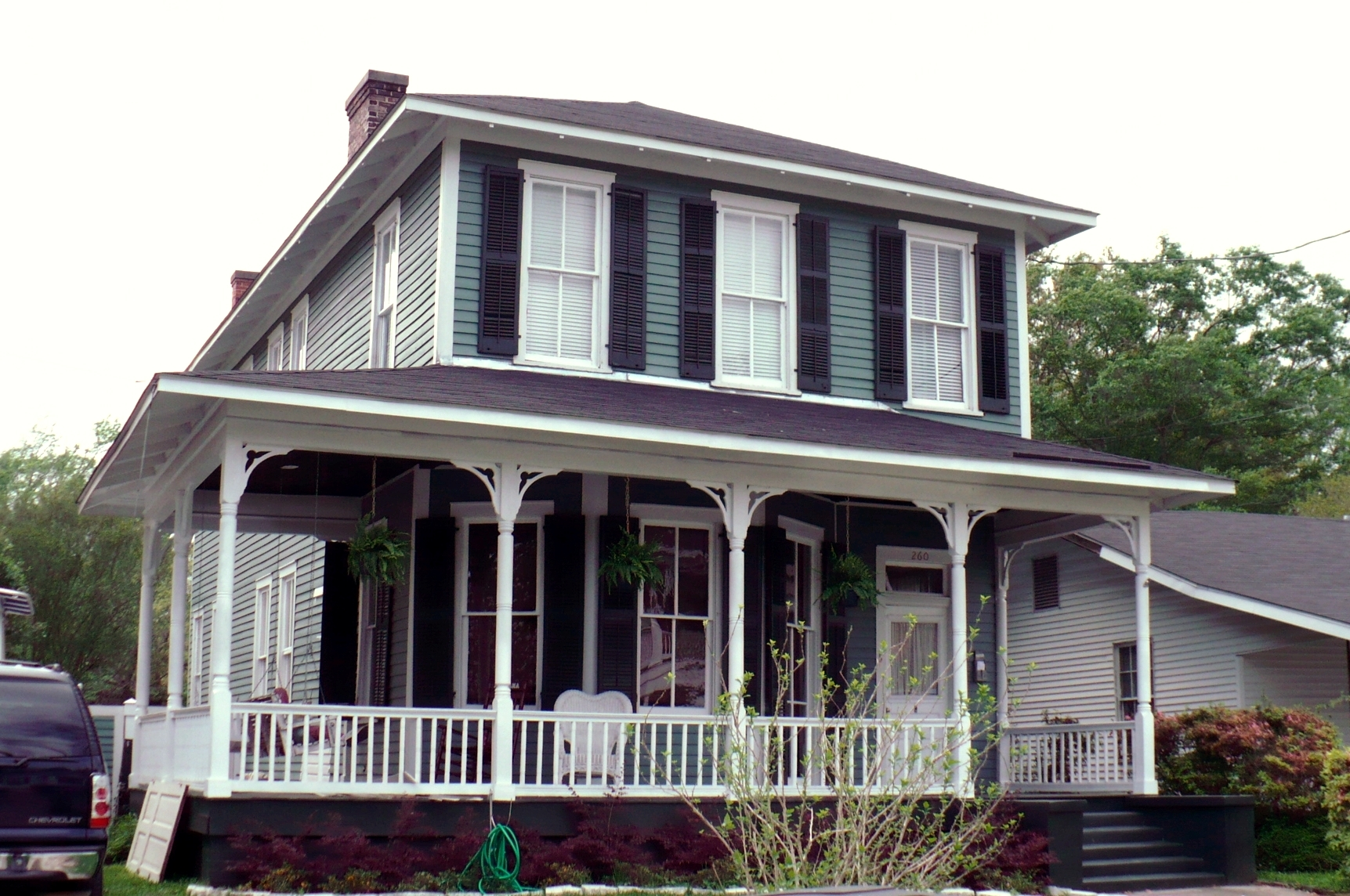
260 Dexter Avenue

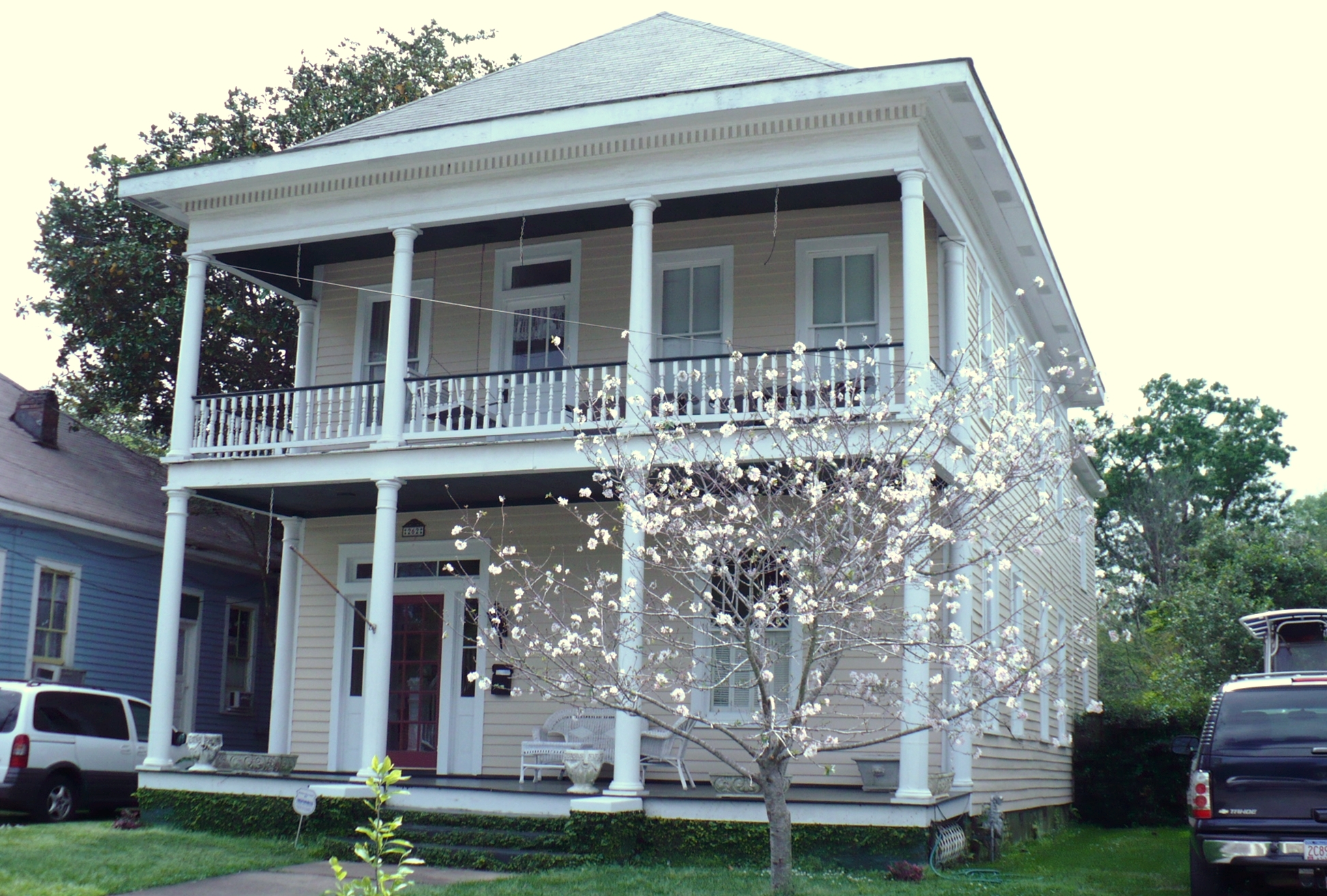
262 Dexter Avenue
