= Reedtown, Virginia =

Unincorporated community in Virginia, US

Coordinates: 37.379887°N 75.914939°W

Reedtown is an unincorporated community in Northampton County, Virginia, United States.
