= Pecan Grove =

A pecan grove is an orchard for pecans, see pecan grove (orchard). For locations named Pecan Grove see:

- Pecan Grove (Church Hill, Mississippi), listed on the NRHP in Mississippi
- Pecan Grove, Texas
- Pecan Grove, Collin County, Texas, an unincorporated community
