= South Salina Street Historic District =

Historic district in New York, United States

- U.S. National Register of Historic Places
- U.S. Historic district
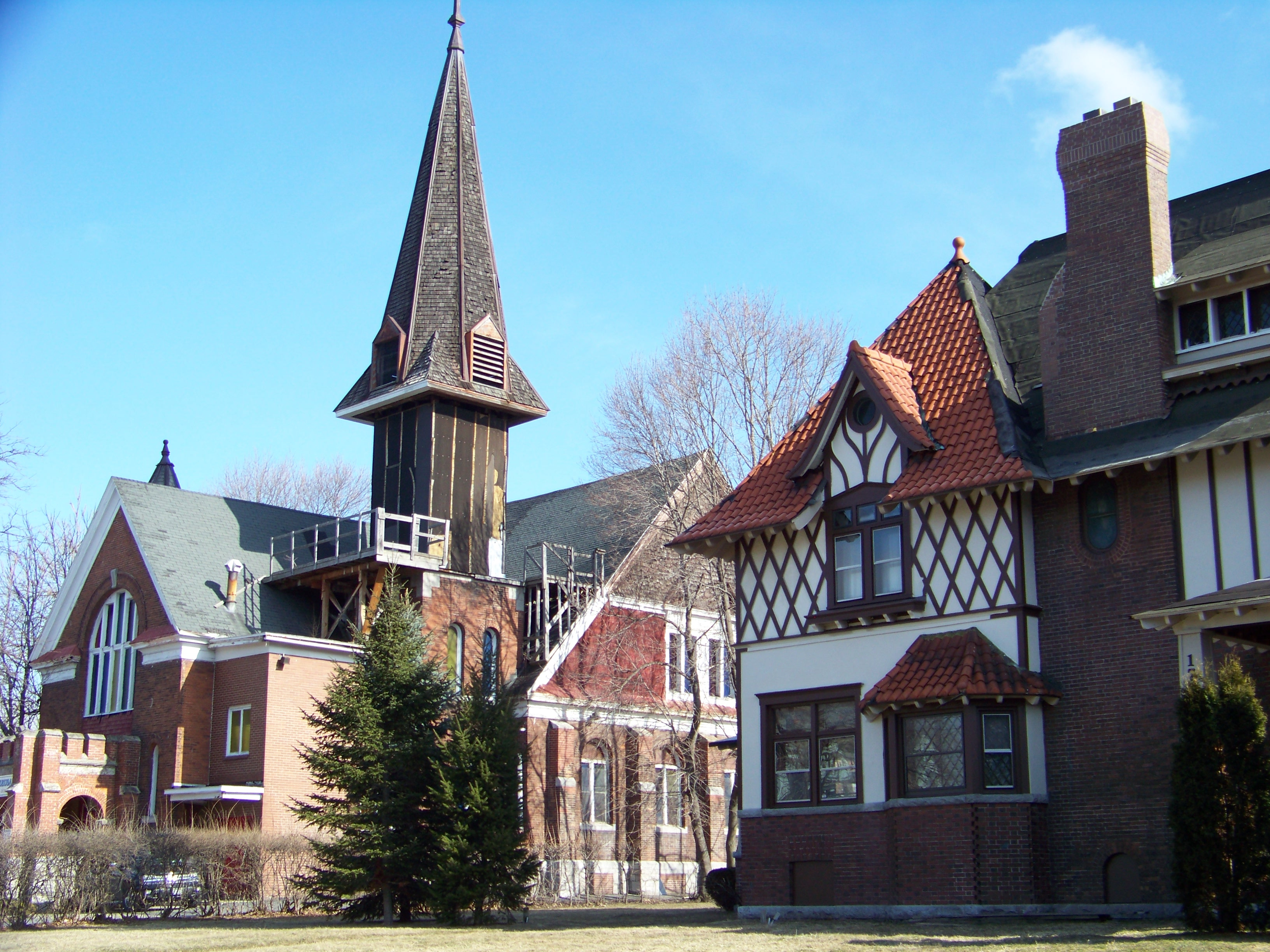
- 1709 and 1641 South Salina Street

- Location within New York Location within the United States
- Location: 111 W. Kennedy St. and 1555--1829 and 1606--1830 S. Salina St., Syracuse, New York
- Coordinates: 43°1′46″N 76°8′51″W
- Built: 1874
- Architect: Russell, Archimedes; Et al.
- Architectural style: Late Victorian, Mixed (more Than 2 Styles From Different Periods)
- NRHP reference No.: 86000671
- Added to NRHP: March 27, 1986

The South Salina Street Historic District is located in Syracuse, New York. The district encompasses the historic core of what was originally the village of Danforth. It was added to the National Register of Historic Places in 1986.

== Gallery ==
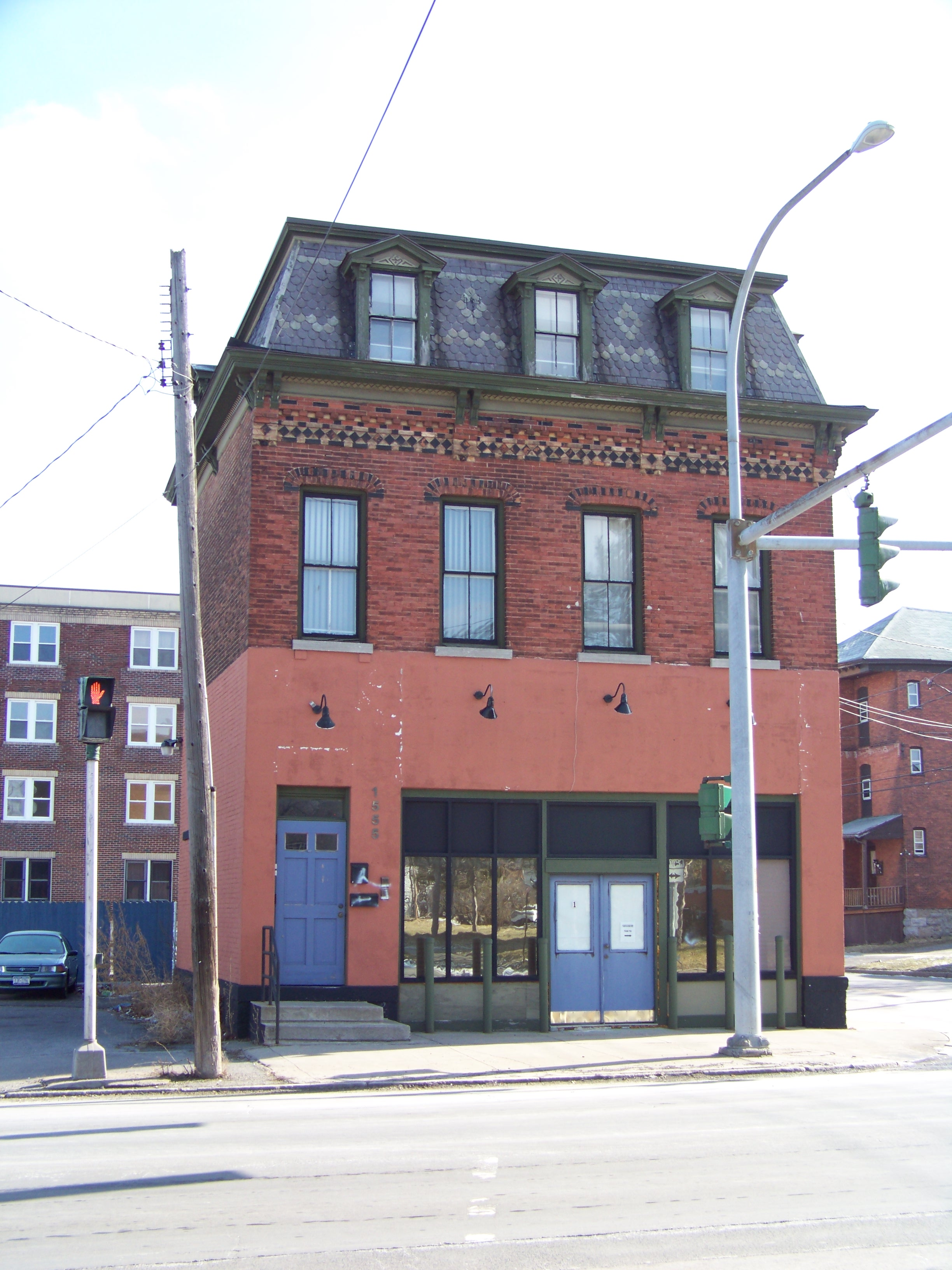
1555 South Salina Street

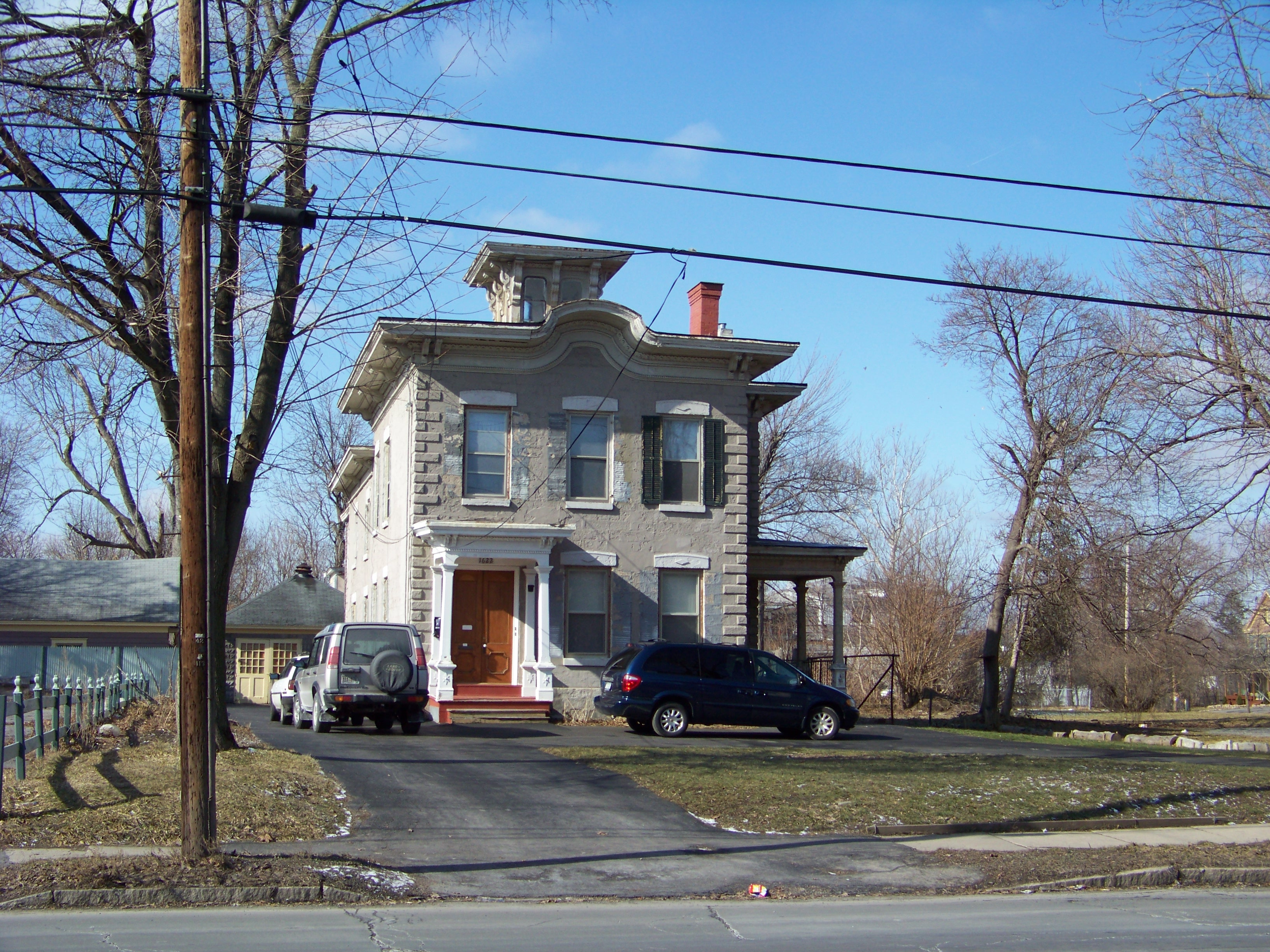
1622 South Salina Street

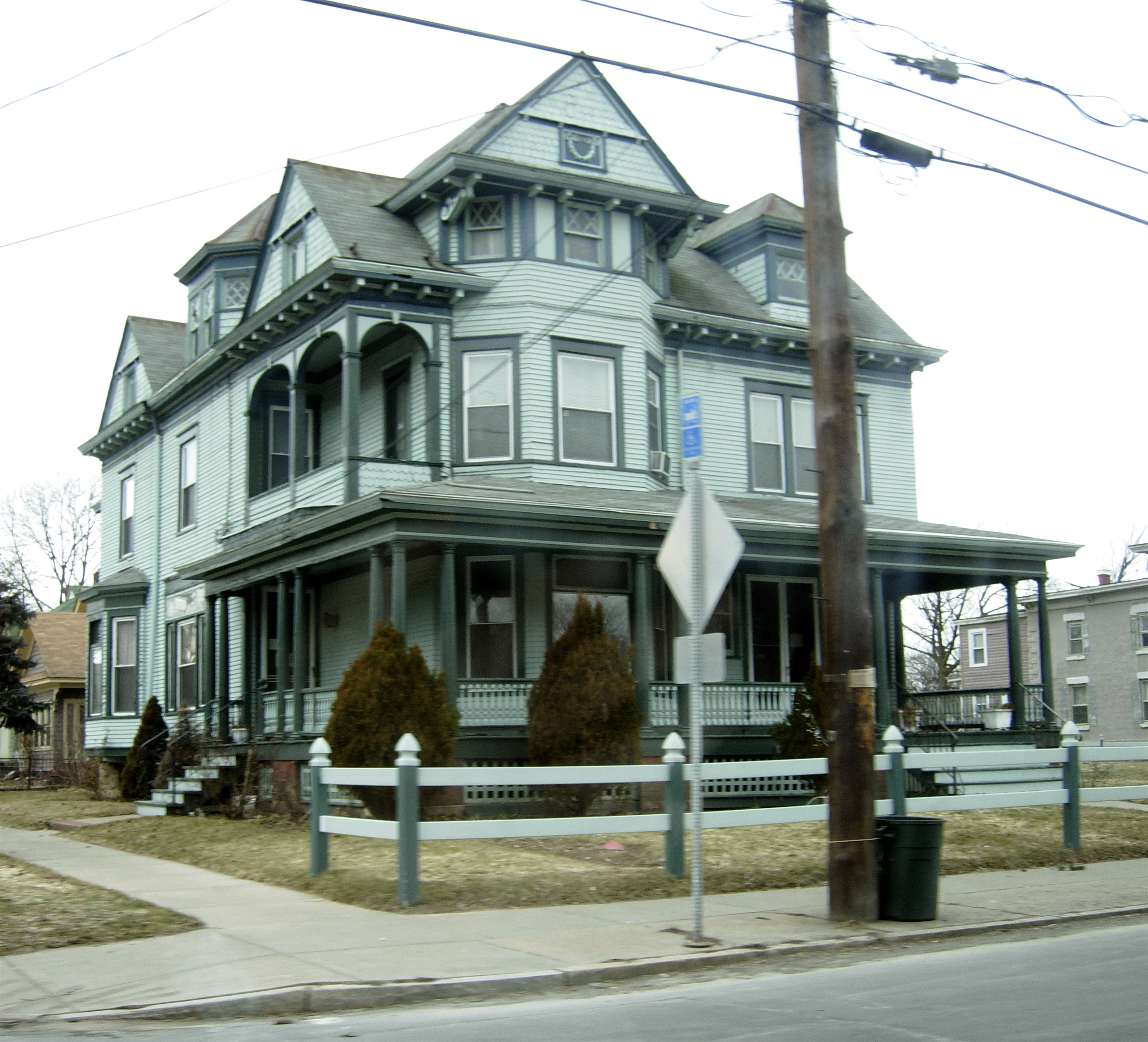
1638 South Salina Street

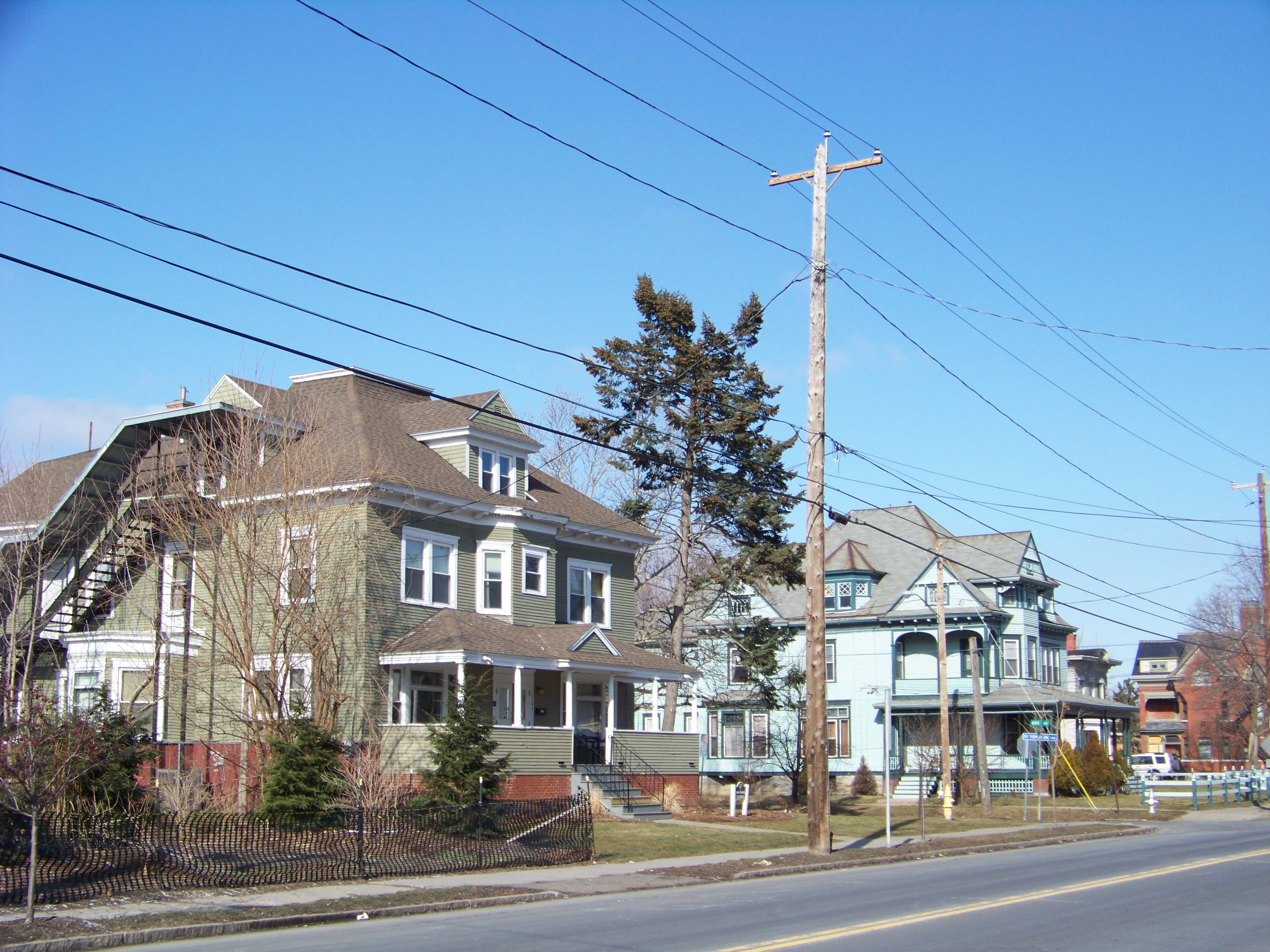
1704 and 1638 South Salina Street

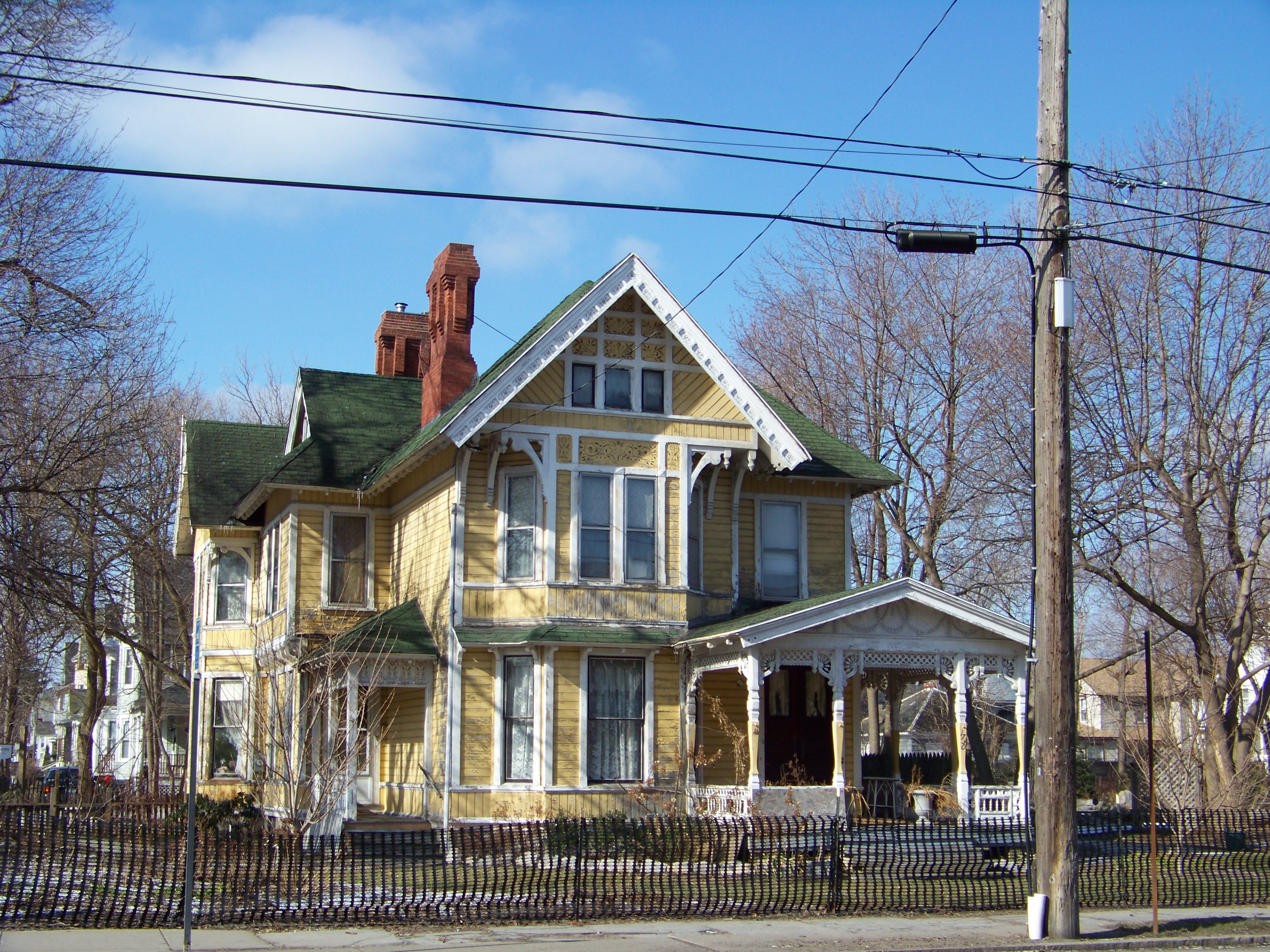
1730 South Salina Street

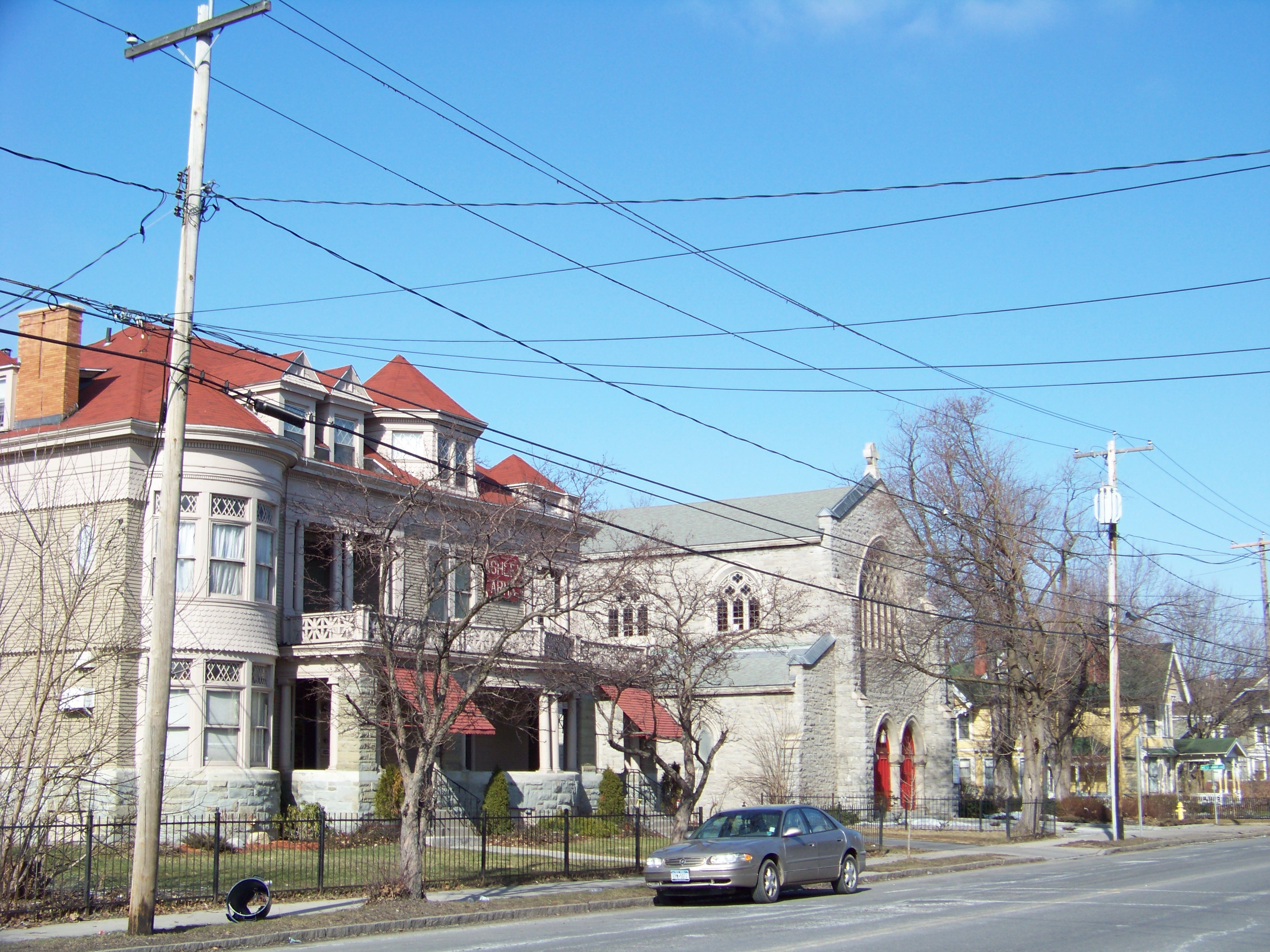
1818 and 1804 South Salina Street
