= Hillbrook (Washington, D.C.) =

Coordinates: 38°53′38.1″N 76°55′54.8″W

- Neighborhood of Washington, D.C.
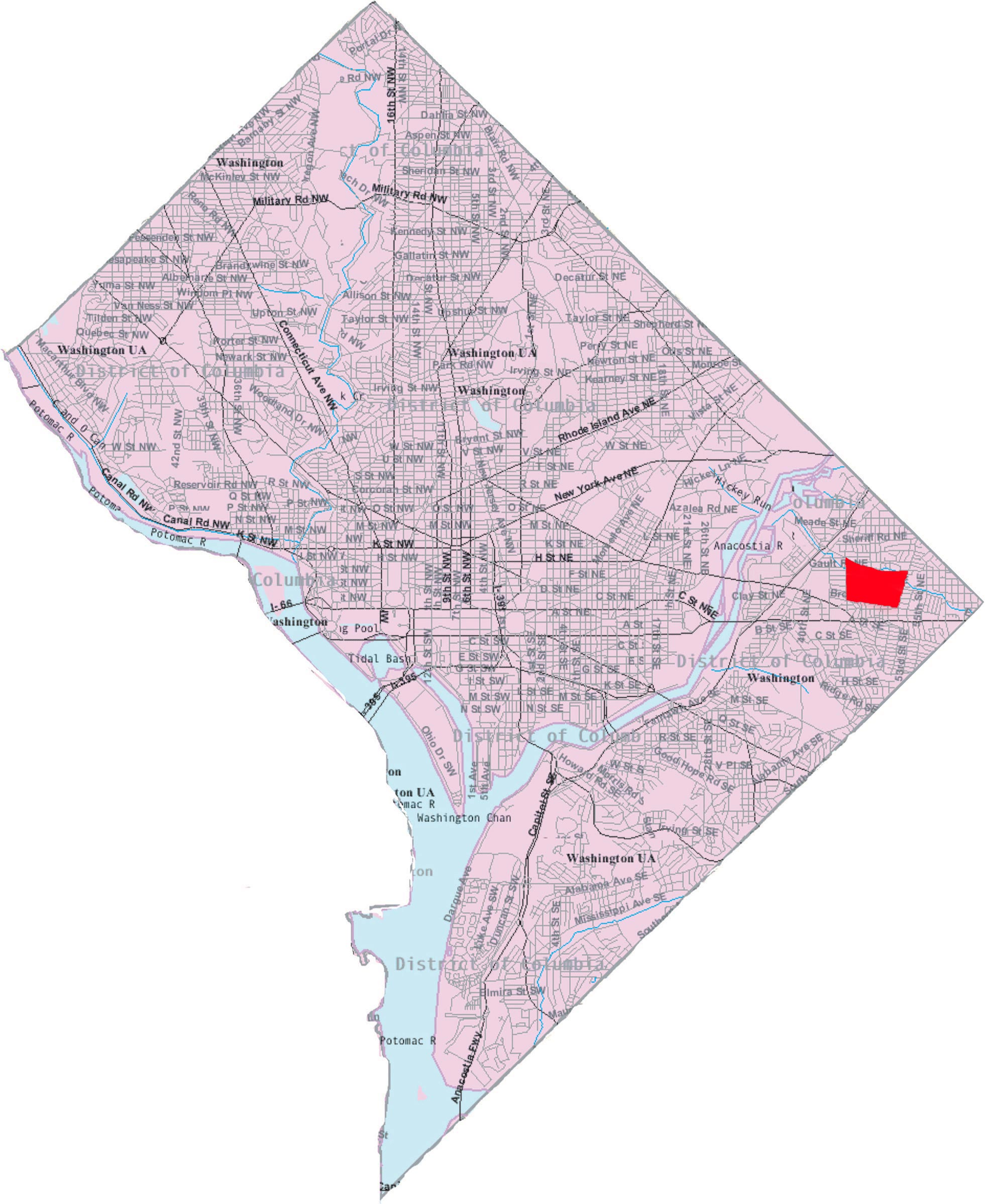
- Hillbrook within the District of Columbia
- Country: United States
- District: Washington, D.C.
- Ward: Ward 7

Government
  - Councilmember: Wendell Felder

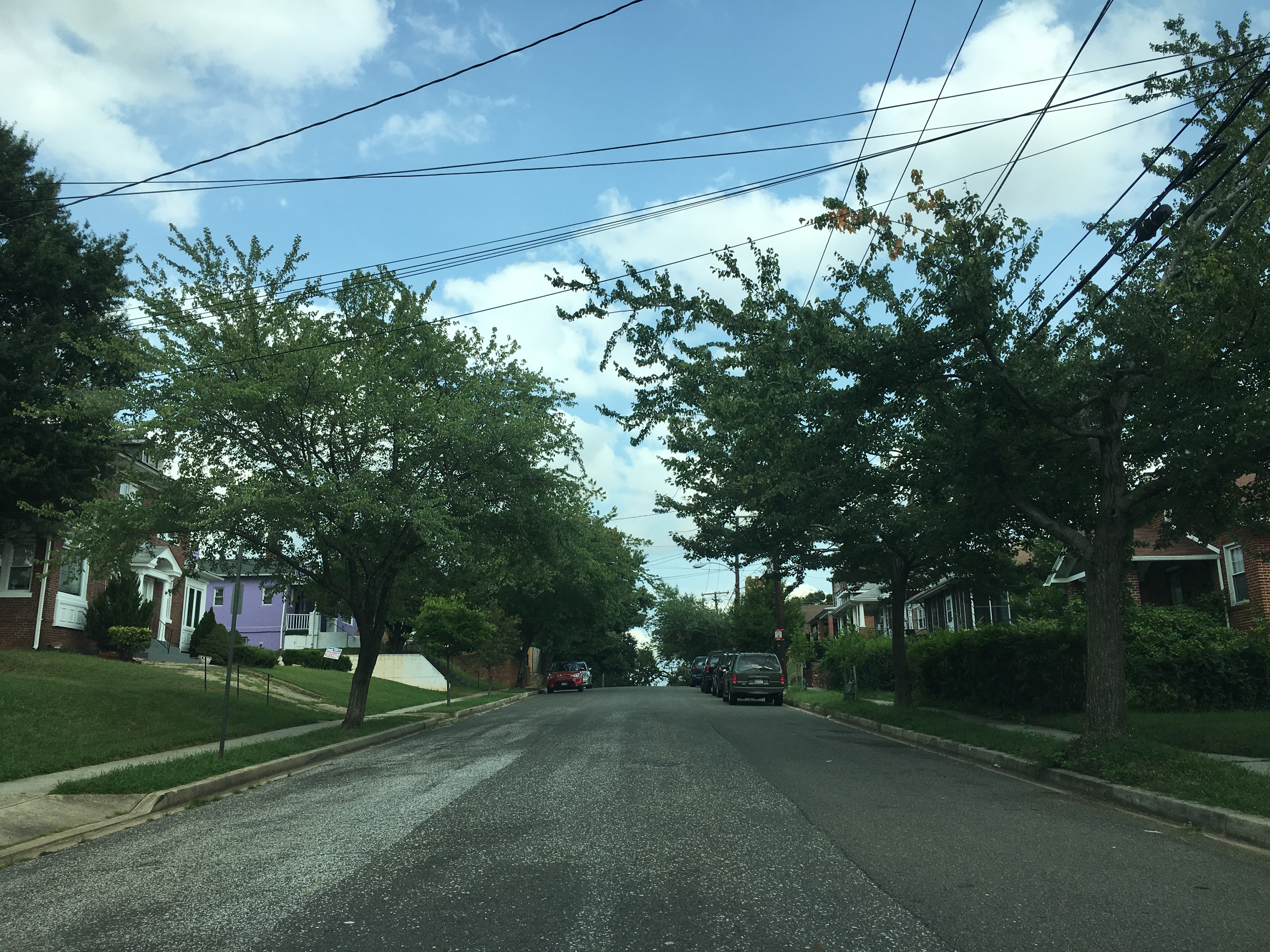
Hillbrook neighborhood at the intersection of Ames St and 50th St NE looking east, August 2018

Hillbrook is a neighborhood in Northeast Washington, D.C. It is bounded by Nannie Helen Burroughs Avenue to the north, Brooks Street to the south, 44th Street NE to the west, and Division Avenue to the east.
