= Hallmark, Louisville =

Neighborhood in Louisville, Kentucky

Coordinates: 38°13′16″N 85°48′15″W

Hallmark is a small, primarily residential neighborhood in western Louisville, Kentucky, United States founded in 1965. Its boundaries are Cane Run Road to the west, Algonquin Parkway to the north, and Cypress street to the east. The origins of its name are not known. The area sits along Algonquin Park east to west near the border of Louisville and Shively. There are few distinctions that separate Hallmark from the surrounding areas of Park Duvalle or Shively.

One of the most prominent churches in the area was the Canaan Missionary Baptist Church once located in the Hallmark area from 1984 to 1998, drawing most of the people around Hallmark and areas in the west end to the church on Sundays. The church moved to Hikes Point at the former Southeast Christian Church where they currently worship and is presently one of the largest African-American Baptist churches in Kentucky. The church is now home to the Hill Street Baptist Church at the old Dixie Highway site.
