= North Valley, Syracuse =

Neighborhood in Syracuse, New York

Coordinates: 43.008°N 76.147°W

North Valley
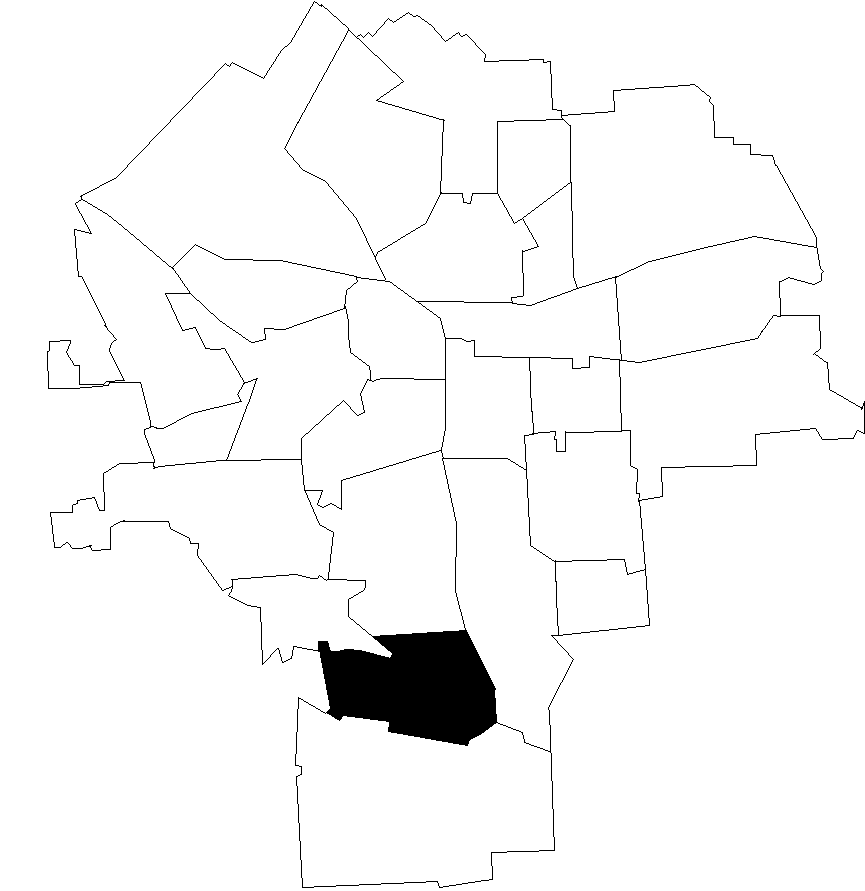

Population (2000)
  - Total: 5,726
- ZIP Codes: 13205

The North Valley is a neighborhood in Syracuse, New York. The main streets include Midland Avenue, South Salina Street and Valley Drive. There are several neighborhood civic and athletic associations that extend into the South Valley neighborhood, as well as a thriving business community. Van Duyn Elementary School, and Faith Heritage are located within the North Valley.

The John Gridley House was listed on the National Register of Historic Places in 1977.
