= Winburn, Lexington =

Winburn
- Neighborhood of Lexington, Kentucky
- Interactive map of Winburn
- Coordinates: 38.088°N 84.476°W
- Country: United States
- State: Kentucky
- County: Fayette
- City: Lexington

Area
  - Total: 0.423 sq mi (1.10 km^{2})
  - Water: 0 sq mi (0.0 km^{2})

Population (2000)
  - Total: 1,424
  - Density: 3,356/sq mi (1,296/km^{2})
- Time zone: UTC-5 (Eastern (EST))
  - Summer (DST): UTC-4 (EDT)
- ZIP code: 40511
- Area code: 859

Winburn is a neighborhood in northeast Lexington, Kentucky, United States. Its boundaries are I-75/ I-64 to the north, Newtown Pike to the west, Citation Boulevard to the south, and Russell Cave Road to the east. The smaller Griffin Gate neighborhood is typically included as part of Winburn.

== Neighborhood statistics ==
- Area: 0.423 square miles (1.10 km^{2})
- Population: 1,424
- Population density: 3,356 people per square mile
- Median household income: $31,797
