= Pecan Valley, San Antonio =

Pecan Valley is a primarily residential area located in San Antonio, Texas, USA on the city's Southeast Side.

Schools include Highlands High School and P.F. Stewart Elementary. It contains the now closed (2012) Pecan Valley Golf Club, site of the 1968 PGA Championship, which was held in conjunction with the world's fair HemisFair '68.
