= B (AC Transit) =

Bus service in Oakland and San Leandro, California

Overview
- Operator: Key System (1906–1960); AC Transit (1960–2020)
- Began service: 1906
- Ended service: 2020

Route
- Locale: Oakland, San Francisco
- Start: Lakeshore Ave. & Longridge Dr.
- Via: Longridge Dr., Trestle Glen Rd.
- End: Salesforce Transit Center
- Timetable: B
- Map: B

The B was a bus service operated by AC Transit in the San Francisco Bay Area. It is one of the operator's many transbay routes, which are intended to provide riders a long-distance service across the San Francisco Bay between the East Bay and San Francisco. It specifically served Oakland's Grand Avenue corridor to the Grand Lake and Trestle Glen neighborhoods. The service was descendant of a Key System streetcar and ferry line that operated prior to the formation of AC Transit. The line was suspended in response to the COVID-19 pandemic.

== History ==
Part of the Key System's initial plans involved a line into Oakland, and to see that through the company acquired franchises in 1906 for local lines in town, including one on 22nd Street. Construction of the line was made difficult by, swampy landscape and the 1906 earthquake. The 22nd Street line opened for service on May 16, 1906, with full train-ferry service. Rebuilt "Lehigh" interurban cars initially used on the Key's Piedmont Line were utilized for the service. The line was so busy that it necessitated the construction of a new interlocking tower at Oakland Junction (later Emeryville Junction), where it split from the main line to Berkeley. The Key Route Inn opened as the new Oakland terminal at Broadway in 1907 — it was another piece of Francis Marion "Borax" Smith's real estate and traction empire.

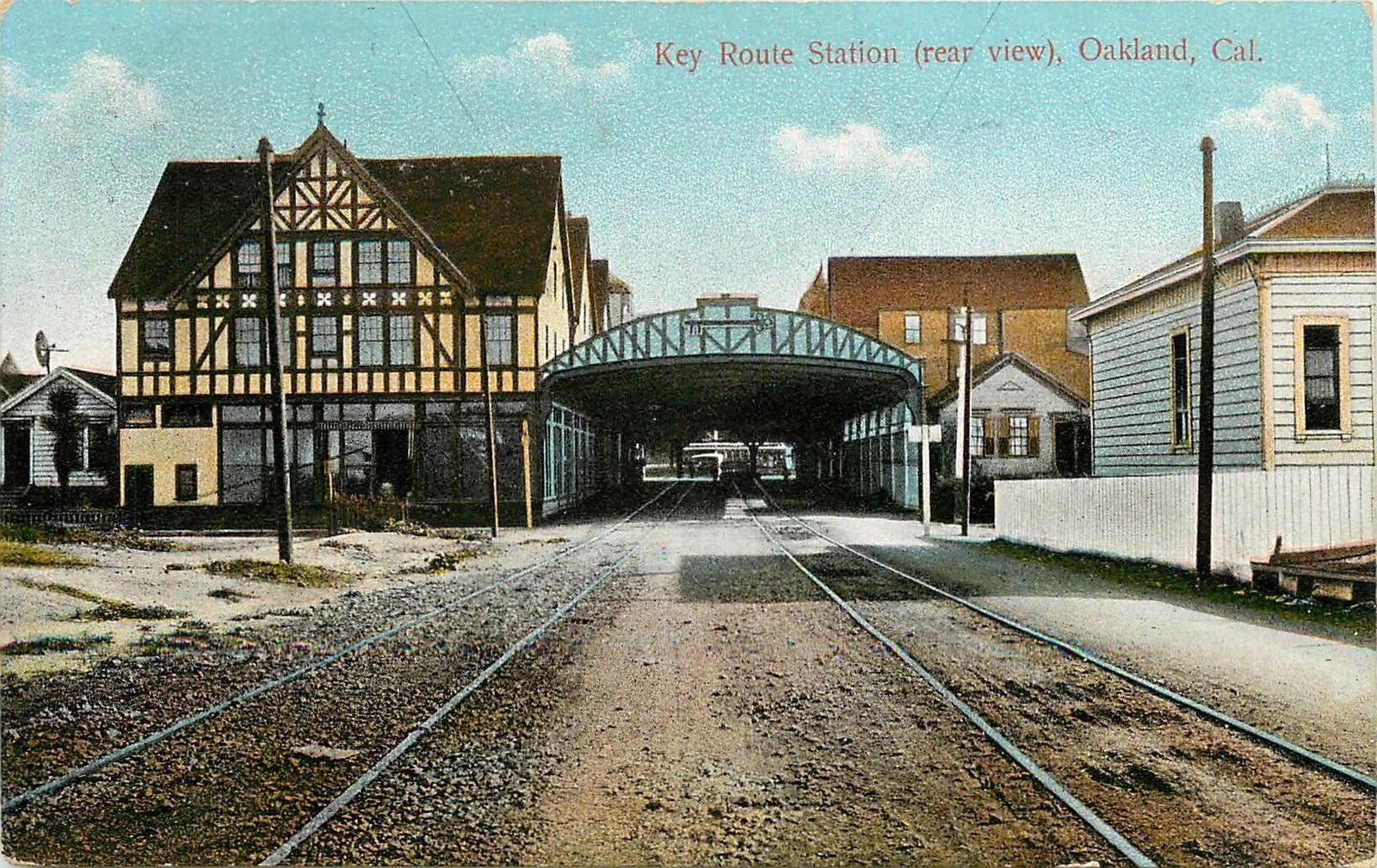
Early divided back postcard of the Key Route Inn, showing the Key Route tracks and terminus at the hotel's rear, postmarked 1912

In 1919, the line was extended out Grand and Lakeshore to Wesley Way in anticipation of real estate development in the Trestle Glen and Indian Gulch areas. It was further extended through a private right-of-way to Underhills Road on November 8, 1920. For the first year of service, trolley wire on this section of the line was strung from trees. Real estate developers would go on to include in their subdivisions a series of walking paths and stairways to provide access to trains.

Cars began running across the San Francisco–Oakland Bay Bridge to the Transbay Terminal upon the facility's opening in 1939. The Key System adopted letter designations for its transbay routes at this time, with the Trestle Glen Line designated as route B. Rail service ended after April 20, 1958, and motor coaches began operating on the line.

=== Public ownership ===
AC Transit took over operation of the Key System's assets in October 1960. Express trips began utilizing the MacArthur Freeway starting on May 16, 1962. The line would be rerouted to serve the Oakland Army Base between 1963 and 1976. Service was discontinued on September 14, 1986, by which time it was referred to as the B-2 Line.

By 1998, transbay service to the Trestle Glen neighborhood had been reestablished as the BX. Buses ceased serving the Transbay Terminal on August 7, 2010, and the San Francisco terminus was moved to the Temporary Transbay Terminal. The B line began running to the Salesforce Transit Center on August 12, 2018. The service was suspended in 2020 amid the COVID-19 pandemic.
