= Olmsted Brothers =

Landscape design firm

- Industry: Landscape architectural firm
- Founded: 1898
- Founder: John Charles Olmsted; Frederick Law Olmsted Jr.
- Defunct: 2000
- Headquarters: Brookline, Massachusetts

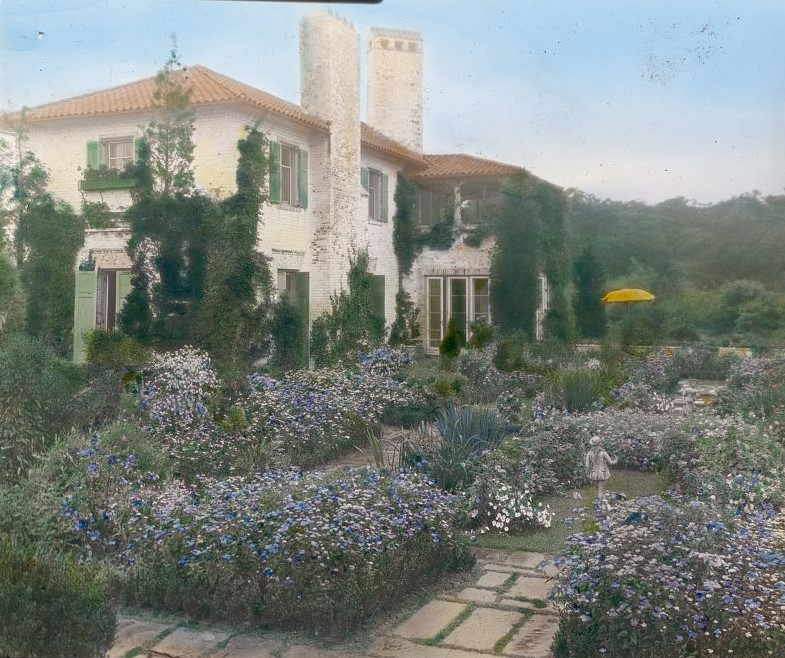
"Barberrys", Nelson Doubleday house, Mill Neck, New York, by Frances Benjamin Johnston, 1921. Architect: Harrie Thomas Lindberg (1916). Landscape: Percival Gallagher, Olmsted Brothers, 1919–1924 and others

The Olmsted Brothers company was a landscape architectural firm in the United States, established in 1898 by brothers John Charles Olmsted (1852–1920) and Frederick Law Olmsted Jr. (1870–1957), sons of the landscape architect Frederick Law Olmsted.

== History ==
The Olmsted Brothers inherited the nation's first landscape architecture firm from their father Frederick Law Olmsted. This firm was a successor to the earlier firm of Olmsted, Olmsted and Eliot after the death of their partner Charles Eliot in 1897. The two brothers were among the founding members of the American Society of Landscape Architects (ASLA) and played an influential role in creating the National Park Service. Prior to their takeover of the firm, Frederick Law Olmsted Jr. had worked as an apprentice under his father, helping to design projects such as Biltmore Estate and the World's Columbian Exposition before graduating from Harvard University. With Charles Eliot, they also designed the gardens of Cairnwood House in Pennsylvania and Lady Meredith House in Montreal.

The firm employed nearly 60 staff at its peak in the early 1930s. Notable landscape architects in the firm included James Frederick Dawson, Arthur Asahel Shurcliff and Percival Gallagher. After becoming an associate partner in 1904 Dawson became a full partner in 1922. Gallagher become an associate partner in 1906 and a partner in 1927, until his death in 1934. Edward Clark Whiting became an associate partner in 1920 and partner in 1927. In that same year Henry Vincent Hubbard became a partner and remained with the firm until his death in 1947. William B. Marquis became a partner in 1937.

The last Olmsted family member in the firm, Frederick Law Olmsted Jr., retired from active practice in 1949, but remained a partner until 1957. The firm itself remained in operation, with Carl Rust Parker, Partridge Richardson and Charles Scott Riley becoming partners in 1950. By 1958 Joseph George Hudak had also become a partner.

In 1962 the firm changed its name to Olmsted Associates to reflect the retirement of Parker in 1960, Riley in 1961, Marquis in 1962, and the death of Whiting in 1962, leaving the firm to continue under Richardson and Hudak with Erno J. Fonagy joining them as an associate. Olmsted Associates was dissolved in 1979. Afterwards Richardson continued to practice under the name The Olmsted Office from Brookline in 1980 and continuing in Fremont, New Hampshire until 2000. This created one continuous firm from 1858 to 2000.

== Office and archives ==
"Fairsted"—the firm's 100-year-old headquarters and design office—has been carefully preserved as the Frederick Law Olmsted National Historic Site, located on 7 acres (2.833 ha) of landscaped grounds at 99 Warren St., Brookline, Massachusetts. It offers excellent insights into the practice of large-scale landscape design and engineering. The site also houses an archive (access by appointment only) of the firm's designs, plant lists, and photos for hundreds of projects.

== Design work ==
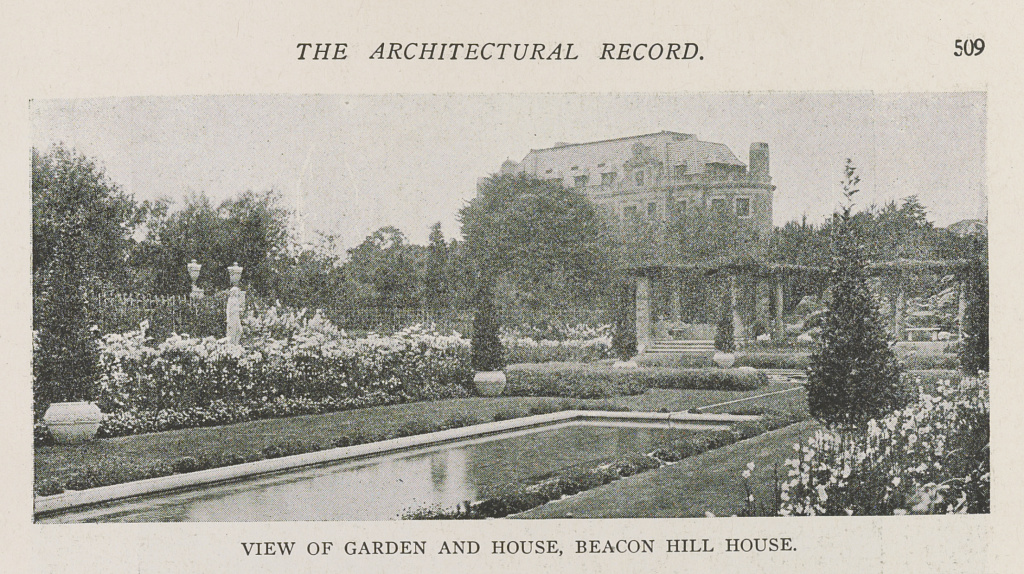
View of garden and house, Beacon Hill House, Newport residence of Arthur Curtiss James, by Olmsted Brothers

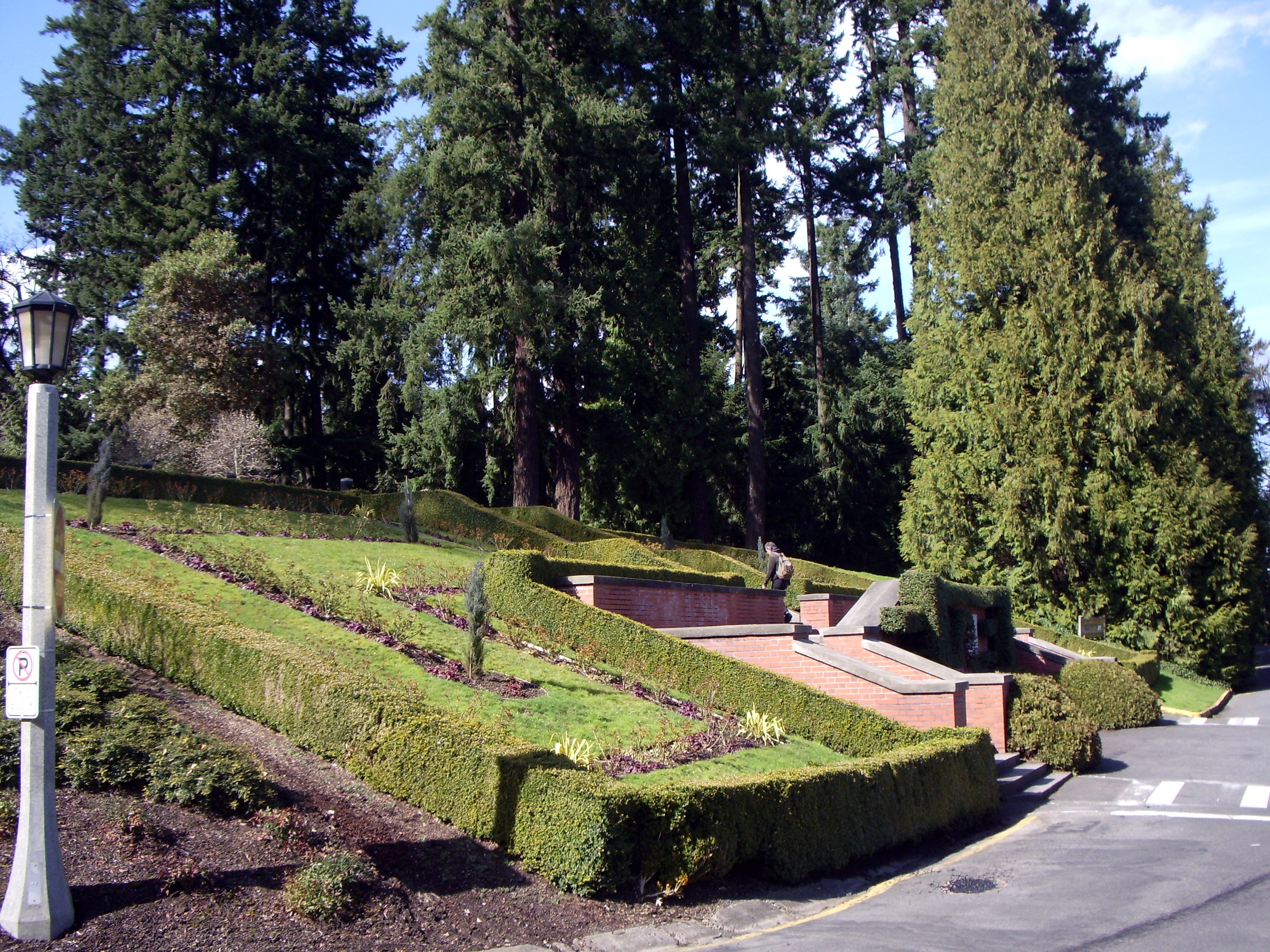
Washington Park in Portland, Oregon

The Olmsted Brothers completed numerous high-profile projects, many of which remain popular to this day, including park systems, universities, exposition grounds, libraries, hospitals, residential neighborhoods and state capitols. Notable commissions include the roadways in the Great Smoky Mountains and Acadia National Parks; Yosemite Valley; Atlanta's Piedmont Park; Springvale Park; Uplands; residential neighborhoods in Oak Bay, British Columbia, Canada, Oakland, California, including the street layout for what is now the Lakeshore Homes Association (the oldest homeowners' association west of the Mississippi River and which includes parts of Oakland's historic Crocker Highlands and Trestle Glen neighborhoods), Palos Verdes Estates, California, (the largest Olmsted Brothers residential project) and Baltimore, Maryland (including parts of Mayfield and Roland Park); entire park systems in cities such as Birmingham, Cleveland, Portland, Seattle; and Washington state's Northern State Hospital. The Olmsted Brothers also co-authored, with Harland Bartholomew, a 1930 report for the Los Angeles Chamber of Commerce entitled "Parks, Playgrounds, and Beaches for the Los Angeles Region" encouraging the preservation of outdoor public space in southern California. The report was largely ignored by the city, but became an important urban planning reference. In addition to these higher profile projects, the Olmsted Brothers took on projects beautifying residential areas.

The Olmsted Brothers were particularly influential on college campuses, helping to plan and design universities across the country by creating close ties between architecture and environment in the built landscape to the purpose of the institution. This can first be tied to their unimplemented work with the College of California, now the University of California, Berkeley, which envisioned a campus that would be integrated with the surrounding community. Other campuses include Stanford University, with a plan drawn specifically to accommodate California's climate; the University of Mississippi, with a plan that would allow for future campus expansion; Washington University in St. Louis; The College of New Jersey; Duke University; Brown University; Williams College; Berea College and the Lincoln Institute; Howard College (now Samford University); the University of Maine; the University of Rochester; Huntingdon College; Denison University; and the administration building lawn at the University of Idaho. Their portfolio also includes secondary educational institutions, such as Emma Willard School (a private girls-only secondary school in New York) and Lawrenceville School (a secondary school in New Jersey).

== See also ==
- List of Olmsted works
