= Harre W. Demoro =

American journalist (1939–1993)

Harre Wilkins Demoro
- Born: July 8, 1939; Oakland, California, U.S.
- Died: March 19, 1993 (aged 53); Berkeley, California, U.S.
- Occupations: Journalist, author
- Spouse: Jo Murray
- Children: 1
- Writing career
- Years active: 1962–1993
- Subjects: Public transportation, railroads, ferries

Harre Wilkins Demoro (July 8, 1939–March 19, 1993) was an American journalist and author from the San Francisco Bay Area who primarily covered public transportation and ferries. He worked for several newspapers in the Bay Area, including the San Francisco Chronicle and Oakland Tribune, and covered the development of the Bay Area Rapid Transit system. Demoro authored 14 books on transportation history.

== Early life ==
Demoro was born in Oakland, California. His father, Rafael, was a pharmacist and rail historian who held a collection of historic railroad and ship photographs. Demoro attended St. Joseph Notre Dame High School in Alameda, Oakland City College, and California State College at Hayward. He had sold photographs to local newspapers while working as a carrier for the Alameda Times.

== Career ==
After serving in the U.S. Army, Demoro joined the San Leandro Morning News as a reporter in 1962. He wrote articles for the Fremont News Register, San Jose Mercury, and Hayward Morning News in his early career. After a move to the Oakland Tribune in 1967, Demoro began to focus on transportation reporting and covered the development of the Bay Area Rapid Transit system. He was selected to join a delegation from the United States Department of Transportation on a trip to the Soviet Union in 1971 to examine the country's transportation systems. Demoro joined the San Francisco Chronicle in 1981 as a business reporter and was assigned to the transportation desk in 1984. He worked for the Chronicle until his death in 1993.

His first book, BART at Mid-point, was published in 1968 ahead of the system's opening. Demoro had intended to write his second book on the history of the Key System—one of the largest defunct Bay Area rail and ferry operators—but instead turned his focus to the Washington State Ferries system due to their shared history. The Evergreen Fleet was published in 1971 with a foreword written by Washington governor Daniel J. Evans. Demoro wrote a two-part history of the Key System in 1985 that was published using records that were saved from destruction and kept at a rented storage unit for preservation.

Outside of his writing career, Demoro was board chairman of the Western Railway Museum in Solano County, California, and president of the Press Club of San Francisco.

== Personal life ==
He was married to Jo Murray, a public relations executive and former Tribune editor, and had one daughter before their separation. Demoro died on March 19, 1993, after heart surgery at Alta Bates Hospital in Berkeley, California, at the age of 53.

== List of works ==
- Demoro, Harre W. (1968). BART at Mid-point: San Francisco's Bold New Rapid-Transit Project. Los Angeles: Interurban Press. OCLC 435470.
- Demoro, Harre W. (1970). Seattle Trolley Coaches. Los Angeles: Interurban Press. OCLC 6219478.
- Demoro, Harre W. (1971). The Evergreen Fleet: A Pictorial History of Washington State Ferries. San Marino, California: Golden West Books. ISBN 9780870950377. OCLC 141974.
- Demoro, Harre W. (1972). The Sacramento Northern Railway. Philadelphia: National Railway Historical Society. ISBN 9781930013254. OCLC 76963493.
- Demoro, Harre W. (1979). Southern Pacific Bay Area Steam. Burlingame, California: Chatham Publishing. ISBN 9780896850378. OCLC 5166847.
- Demoro, Harre W. (1983). Electric Railway Pioneer: Commuting on the Northwestern Pacific, 1903–1941. Glendale, California: Interurban Press. ISBN 9780916374556. OCLC 8110019.
- Demoro, Harre W. (1983). The Silver Short Line: A History of the Virginia & Truckee Railroad. Glendale, California: Trans-Anglo Books. ISBN 9780870460647. OCLC 10547308.
- Demoro, Harre W. (1983). Sacramento Northern. Signature Press. ISBN 978-1930013254. OCLC 907647110.
- Demoro, Harre W. (1985). The Key Route, Part 1: Transbay Commuting by Train and Ferry. Glendale, California: Interurban Press. ISBN 9780916374662. OCLC 11624083.
- Demoro, Harre W. (1985). The Key Route, Part 2: Transbay Commuting by Train and Ferry. Glendale, California: Interurban Press. ISBN 9780916374686. OCLC 11624083.
- Demoro, Harre W. (1986). California's Electric Railways: An Illustrated Review. Glendale, California: Interurban Press. ISBN 9780916374747. OCLC 13703105.
- Kashin, Seymour; Demoro, Harre W. (1986). An American Original, the PCC Car. Glendale, California: Interurban Press. ISBN 9780916374730. OCLC 13396470.
- Demoro, Harre W.; Harder, John N. (1989). Light Rail Transit on the West Coast. New York: Quadrant Press. ISBN 9780915276493. OCLC 21277907.
- Demoro, Harre W.; Sappers, Vernon J. (1992). Rails to San Francisco Bay. New York: Quadrant Press. ISBN 9780915276516. OCLC 29198015.
