= Crocker Highlands, Oakland, California =

Coordinates: 37°48′48″N 122°13′33″W

Crocker Highlands is a neighborhood located in the north-eastern area of Oakland, California, United States.

== Location ==
Crocker Highlands is one of several distinct neighborhoods comprising a larger area collectively known as the "Lower Hills District" that lies in between the 580 and 13 freeways.

Crocker Highlands is bounded by the city of Piedmont to the north, Oakland's Grand Lake/Lakeshore to the west, Trestle Glen to the south, and Glenview to the east. It is roughly bordered by Lakeshore Avenue to the west and Mandana Boulevard to the north and east. It lies at an elevation of 285 feet (87 m).

Population is approximately 2,400, there are 1,026 single-family homes, and land area is about 0.3 square miles or 0.8 square kilometers. Zip code is 94610.

Median household income is $192,174 versus $206,392 for the City of Piedmont and $51,683 for the City of Oakland and 262% higher than the national average. Income per capita is $100,092. Almost two-thirds (64%) of Crocker Highlands' households have an annual income of at least $150,000. One-in-five (19%) have incomes between $75,000 and $150,000.

== Education ==
Crocker Highlands Elementary School, an elementary school located on Midcrest Road, established in 1925, serves around 450 students from kindergarten through 5th grade.
