= Claremont Resort & Club =

Hotel in the hills of Berkeley, California

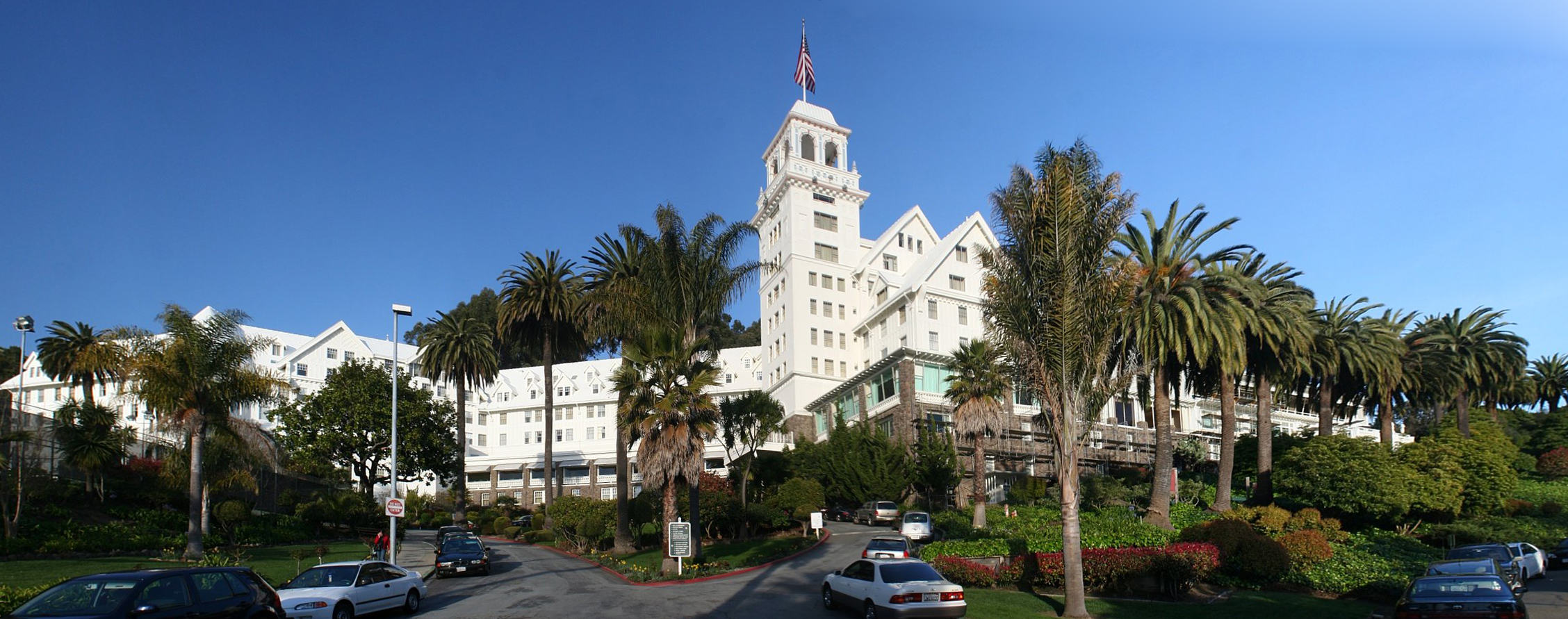
- View east from the parking lot, 2006

General information
- Location: Oakland, California, United States, 41 Tunnel Road, Berkeley, California
- Coordinates: 37.8588°N 122.2418°W
- Opening: 1915
- Owner: Ohana Real Estate Investors
- Operator: HEI Hotels & Resorts

Technical details
- Floor count: 10

Design and construction
- Architects: Charles William Dickey; Walter D. Reed

Other information
- Number of rooms: 279
- Number of suites: Studio Suites; Petite Queen Suites
- Number of restaurants: 2

Website

Oakland Designated Landmark
- Reference no.: 133

The Claremont Resort & Club is a historic American hotel that is situated at the foot of Claremont Canyon in the Berkeley Hills. Located in the Claremont district, near the intersection of Claremont Avenue and Ashby Avenue, the site straddles the city limits of Berkeley and Oakland. The border between the neighboring cities runs down the former Key System E train right of way that now serves as a pathway between the tennis courts which belong to the Berkeley Tennis Club.

At its elevation of 400 ft (120 m), the site provides scenic views of San Francisco Bay.

The building is made of wood. With its 160 feet (49 meters), the central tower of the hotel is one of the world’s tallest wooden buildings.

== Overview ==
Selected locations in and near the Claremont Club & Spa
- Points of interest
- Nearby landmarks
1 Hotel & Spa building
2 Club area
3 Berkeley Tennis Club
4 Seldon Williams House

The site is a few blocks southeast of the University of California, Berkeley's Clark Kerr Campus, generally bounded by Claremont Avenue to the north and west, Ashby Avenue/Tunnel Road to the south, and open space and private homes to the east; it was originally in unincorporated Alameda County, outside of any city limits. The majority of the property is in Oakland, including the entirety of the hotel building, the spa, the gardens and parking area. However, two small portions, one just east of the Berkeley Tennis Club and the other near the intersection of Claremont Avenue and Russell Street, are within the city limits of Berkeley, and the resort uses a mailing address in Berkeley: 41 Tunnel Road, Berkeley CA 94705.

The Berkeley Tennis Club leased a portion of the grounds southwest of the hotel from 1917 to 1945. In 1945, the Club purchased this section of the grounds, and remains located at 1 Tunnel Road in Berkeley, next to the hotel.

The Claremont has 276 guest rooms, 8 tennis courts, 4 pickleball courts, and 22 acres (8.9 ha) of landscaped gardens. Romantic stories say it was once won in a checkers game. The hotel was nominated and deemed eligible for listing on the National Register of Historic Places in 2003, but was not listed due to owner objection. It is a designated Oakland City Historical Landmark. The hotel has been a member of Historic Hotels of America, an official program of the National Trust for Historic Preservation, since 2016.

== History ==
The site was developed initially by an early settler, William Butler Thornburgh, from Jefferson County, West Virginia, who constructed a large home there in approximately 1870 which he called a "castle". After his death in 1878, it was purchased by John Ballard. On July 14, 1901, a wildfire descending from the hills burned the house to the ground. On November 10, 1905, the property was acquired by Louis Titus on behalf of the Claremont Hotel Company for approximately $37,500. The Claremont Hotel Company was a group of investors that included Mr Titus, along with John Hopkins Spring, Francis "Borax" Smith, Frank C. Havens, and Duncan McDuffie. Smith and Havens were already involved with what came to be known as the "Key System", a major transit and real estate development company in the East Bay, whose commuter trains began rolling in 1903.

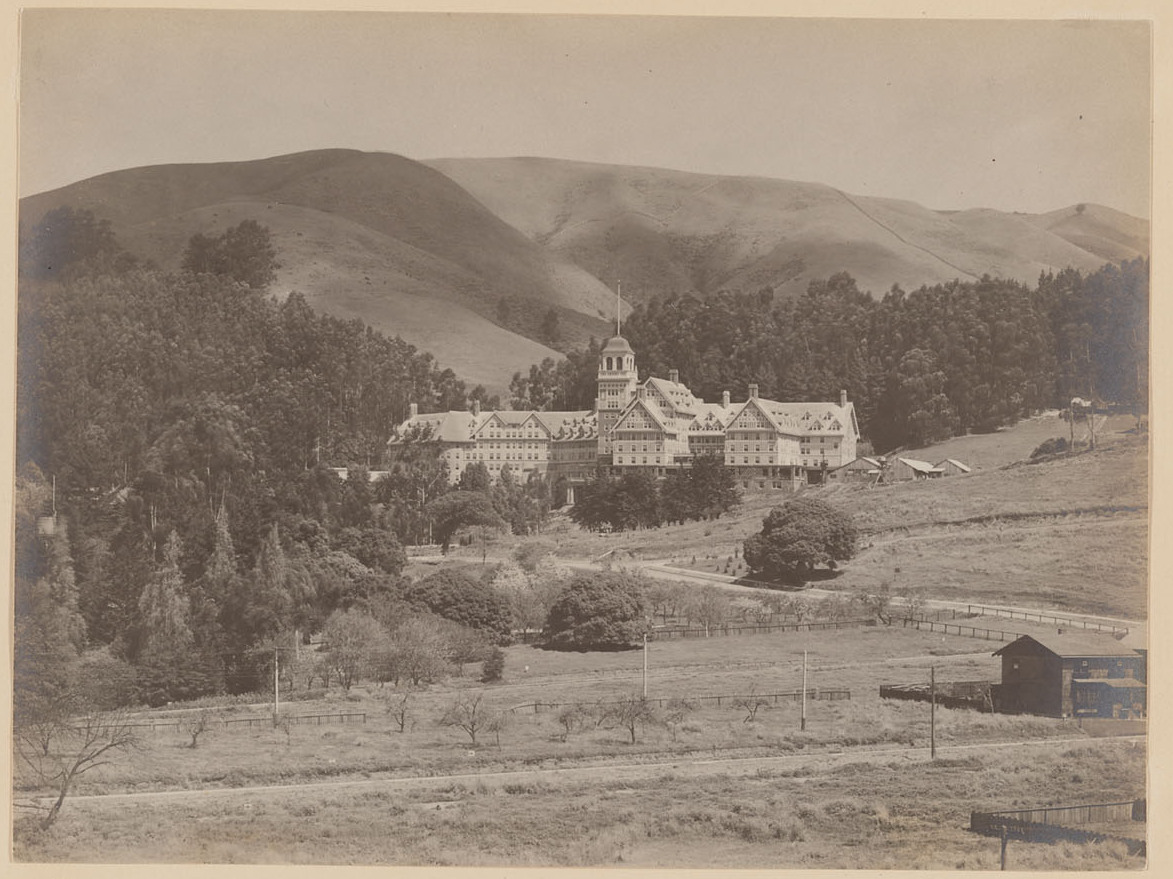
As originally completed c. 1915, there were few surrounding buildings.

Construction of the hotel began soon after the 1905 purchase, contemporaneously with the nearby Claremont Park development of Duncan McDuffie, but halted as a result of supply and financial difficulties caused by the 1906 earthquake. Construction resumed for a time in 1910, but further difficulties impeded progress. In the meantime, a referendum in November 1909 brought the annexation of the area that included most of the hotel site into the city limits of Oakland. Erik Lindblom invested a substantial amount of money to complete the hotel in 1914 and it opened in 1915 as the Claremont Hotel, in time to accommodate travelers to the Panama–Pacific International Exposition across the Bay in San Francisco. It is comparable in scale and design to contemporary grand resort hotels completed in California between 1876 and 1914, including the Mission Inn (1876), Hotel del Coronado (1888), St. Francis Hotel (1904), and Fairmont Hotel (1907). Lindblom would acquire the hotel in 1918, which he held until it was sold to Claude C. Gillum and his wife in 1937. As completed, the hotel was built in the Tudor Revival style, with its exposed half-timber decorative finish.

Unused properties were sold off starting in the 1920s, including the portion southeast of "The Short Cut" pedestrian path connecting Tunnel Road and Alvarado, and the southwestern area now occupied by the Berkeley Tennis Club. Under the Gillums, the Claremont Hotel building was painted white. In 1954, the Gillums sold the hotel to the Harsh Investment Corporation, which leased it to Murray Lehr; Lehr added the first tennis courts and swimming pool to the site. Harsh took over active control in 1971 and implemented more physical changes, completing the project to enclose the verandas started under the Gillums and replacing gardens with tennis courts and parking.

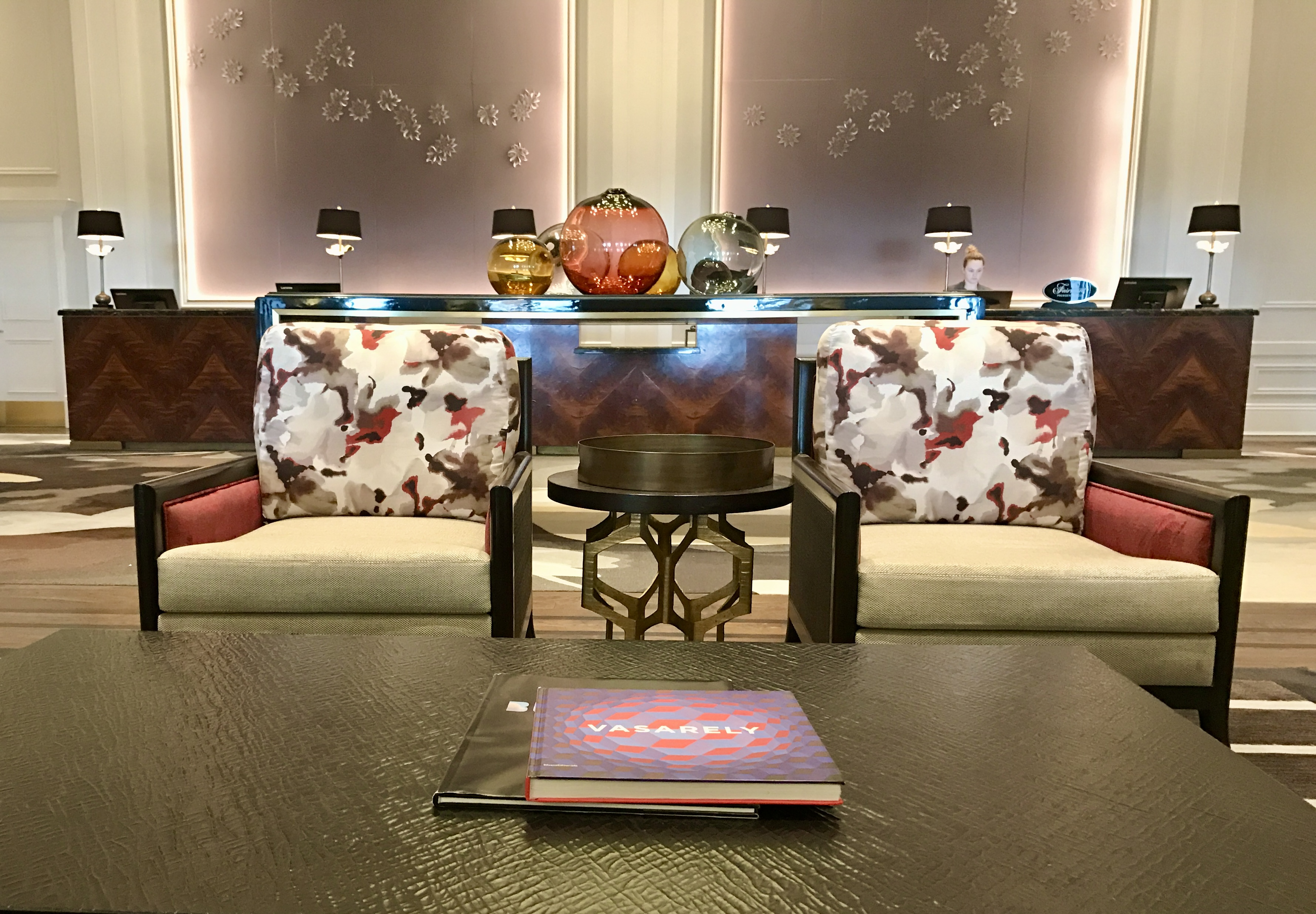
The reception of the Claremont Hotel c. 2017.

The Claremont faced destruction in the 1991 Oakland firestorm, but firefighters and the lessening wind stopped the flames short of the hotel. It was acquired by KSL Claremont Resort, Inc. in 1998.

In 2007, the Claremont was acquired by Morgan Stanley. On February 1, 2011, the resort filed for bankruptcy due to losses attributed to the ongoing recession. Lenders including Paulson & Co., Winthrop Realty Trust and Capital Trust foreclosed on the property. In 2013, the owners reached a deal to sell the Claremont and three other properties to the Government of Singapore Investment Corporation. The Claremont was purchased in March 2014 by the Fairmont Hotel chain and financier Richard Blum for $86 million and rebranded as the Claremont Club & Spa, A Fairmont Hotel. In May 2023, the hotel was purchased by Ohana Real Estate Investors for $163 million. On March 3, 2025, the hotel left the Fairmont group and was rebranded as the Claremont Resort & Club. In 2026, the resort's spa, which had opened in 2001, closed permanently.

=== Transportation ===
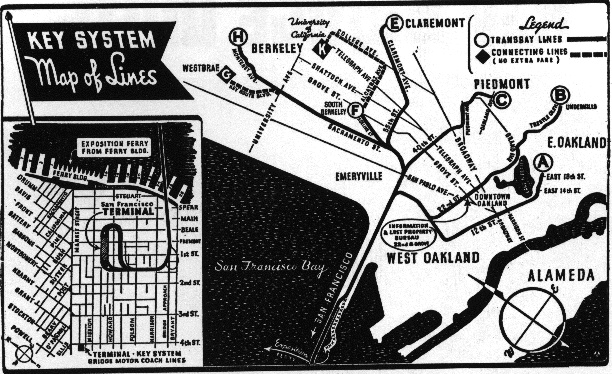
Key System map, c. 1939

A transbay Key System railway line (eventually designated the "E" line) ran from the Transbay Terminal over the San Francisco–Oakland Bay Bridge nearly to the doors of the Claremont Hotel, terminating between the tennis courts that are now part of the Berkeley Tennis Club. Claremont Hotel guests not only had views of San Francisco, but could go there directly from the lobby steps. The Key System tracks were removed in 1958 along with the rest of the Key System. The Key System had constructed another large hotel near downtown Oakland, the Key Route Inn, which also had its own train service.

Besides the direct rail connection, the Claremont Hotel was also convenient to vehicular traffic, as it was situated along the principal route over the Berkeley Hills via Claremont Canyon. In 1903, a small tunnel (the Inter County Tunnel) was excavated above Temescal Canyon (the next canyon southward), accessible by a new road dubbed Tunnel Road, which ran initially from the end of Russell Street but was subsequently re-routed to connect with Ashby Avenue. The same route later led to a newer, larger tunnel which opened in 1937 as the "Broadway Low Level Tunnel", later renamed the Caldecott Tunnel. The street address of the Claremont is still 41 Tunnel Road. Tunnel Road is a designated part of State Highway 13.

Preceding station	Key System	Following station
Hill Crest Road toward Transbay Terminal	E	Terminus

=== Prohibition ===
In 1873, a state law was enacted that prohibited the sale of alcoholic beverages within 2 mi (3.2 km) of the University of California. This statute was amended in 1876, reducing the prohibition distance to 1 mi (1.6 km) from the perimeter of the University of California. In 1913, the hotel's investors sponsored AB 1620 (known as the Ferguson bill), supposedly to further restrict alcohol near churches and schools statewide, but specifically excluding the Claremont Hotel from the dry zone. Influenced by activism from women's clubs and temperance groups in Berkeley, the Ferguson bill was defeated by one vote. Nationwide prohibition of alcohol was instituted on January 17, 1920, when the Volstead Act, enacted pursuant to the 18th Amendment, went into effect. On December 5, 1933, the 18th Amendment was repealed by enactment of the 21st Amendment. After repeal, the Claremont Hotel continued to suffer from the state law prohibiting the sale of liquor within a mile of the university. In 1937, the law was amended to measure the distance following street routes rather than a straight line, and the hotel was then able to serve liquor legally. According to a story on the hotel's website, a student at the university discovered in 1936 that the route was over a mile and was awarded free drinks for life. This point had been publicly discussed in 1913.
