= Key System =

Former local electric railway service in the East Bay

Overview
- Locale: East Bay
- Transit type: Interurban Streetcar
- Headquarters: Key System Building; 1100 Broadway; Oakland, California

Operation
- Began operation: 1903
- Ended operation: (streetcar service) 1948 (commuter train service) 1958 (bus service) 1960
- Character: Mixed grade separated and at-grade street running

Technical
- System length: 66 mi (106 km)
- Track gauge: 4 ft 8 1/2 in (1,435 mm) standard gauge
- Electrification: Overhead line, 600 V DC; Third rail on Bay Bridge

The Key System (or Key Route) was a privately owned company that provided mass transit in the cities of Oakland, Berkeley, Alameda, Emeryville, Piedmont, San Leandro, Richmond, Albany, and El Cerrito in the eastern San Francisco Bay Area from 1903 until 1960, when it was sold to a newly formed public agency, AC Transit. The Key System consisted of local streetcar and bus lines in the East Bay, and commuter rail and bus lines connecting the East Bay to San Francisco by a ferry pier on San Francisco Bay, later via the lower deck of the Bay Bridge. At its height during the 1940s, the Key System had over 66 miles (106 km) of track. The local streetcars were discontinued in 1948 and the commuter trains to San Francisco were discontinued in 1958. The Key System's territory is today served by BART and AC Transit bus service.

== History ==
=== Early years ===
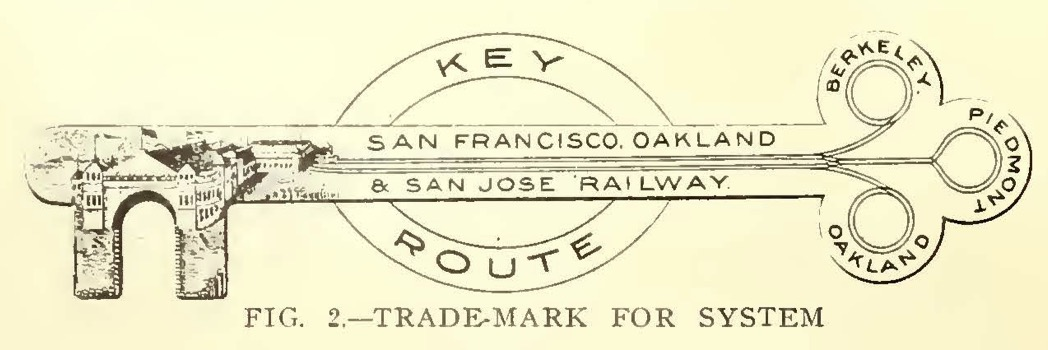
The original San Francisco, Oakland, and San Jose Railway logo, branded as the Key Route

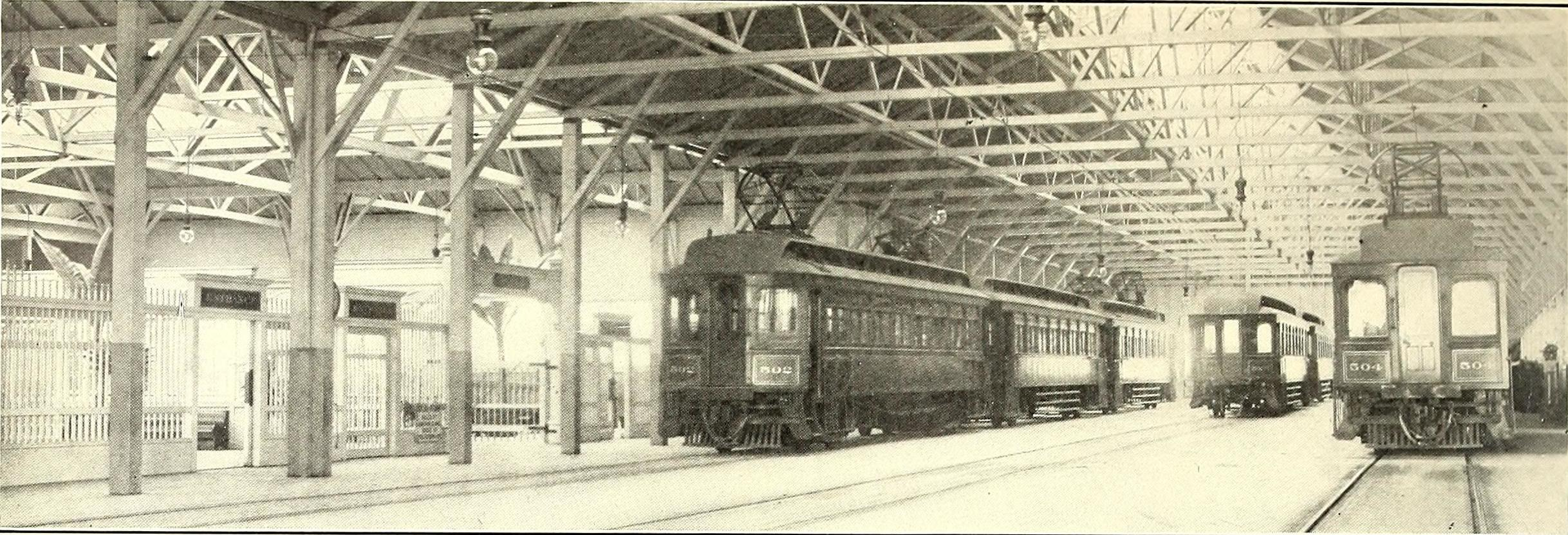
Key Pier, 1909

The system began as a consolidation of several streetcar lines assembled in the late 1890s and early 1900s by Francis Marion "Borax" Smith and his business interests. After having made a fortune in Borax and gained his nickname, "Borax", the entrepreneur turned to real estate and electric traction for streetcars. The Key System was founded as the San Francisco, Oakland, and San Jose Railway (SFOSJR), incorporated in 1902. After consolidating local lines under one company, Smith sought to compete with the Southern Pacific commuter ferry market as well as develop new streetcar suburbs in the East Bay. The troubled California & Nevada Railroad had begun construction of a ferry pier in Oakland, but its plans were never realized. Smith purchased the railroad in order to gain access to its right of way and waterfront operations, as well as use the abandoned pier as a starting point for his own passenger mole.

Transbay service began on October 26, 1903, with a four-car train carrying 250 passengers, departing downtown Berkeley for the ferry to San Francisco. Before the end of 1903, Frank C. Havens, the general manager of the SFOSJR, devised the idea of using a stylized map on which the system's routes resembled an old-fashioned key, with three "handle loops" that covered the cities of Berkeley, Piedmont (initially, "Claremont" shared the Piedmont loop) and Oakland, and a "shaft" in the form of the Key pier, the "teeth" representing the ferry berths at the end of the pier. The company touted its 'key route', which led to the adoption of the name "Key System".

In 1908, the SFOSJR changed its name to the San Francisco, Oakland & San Jose Consolidated Railway; it changed to the San Francisco-Oakland Terminal Railway in 1912. Smith was ousted from the company in 1913. After it went bankrupt in December 1923, it was re-organized as the Key System Transit Co., adopting a marketing concept as the name of the company.

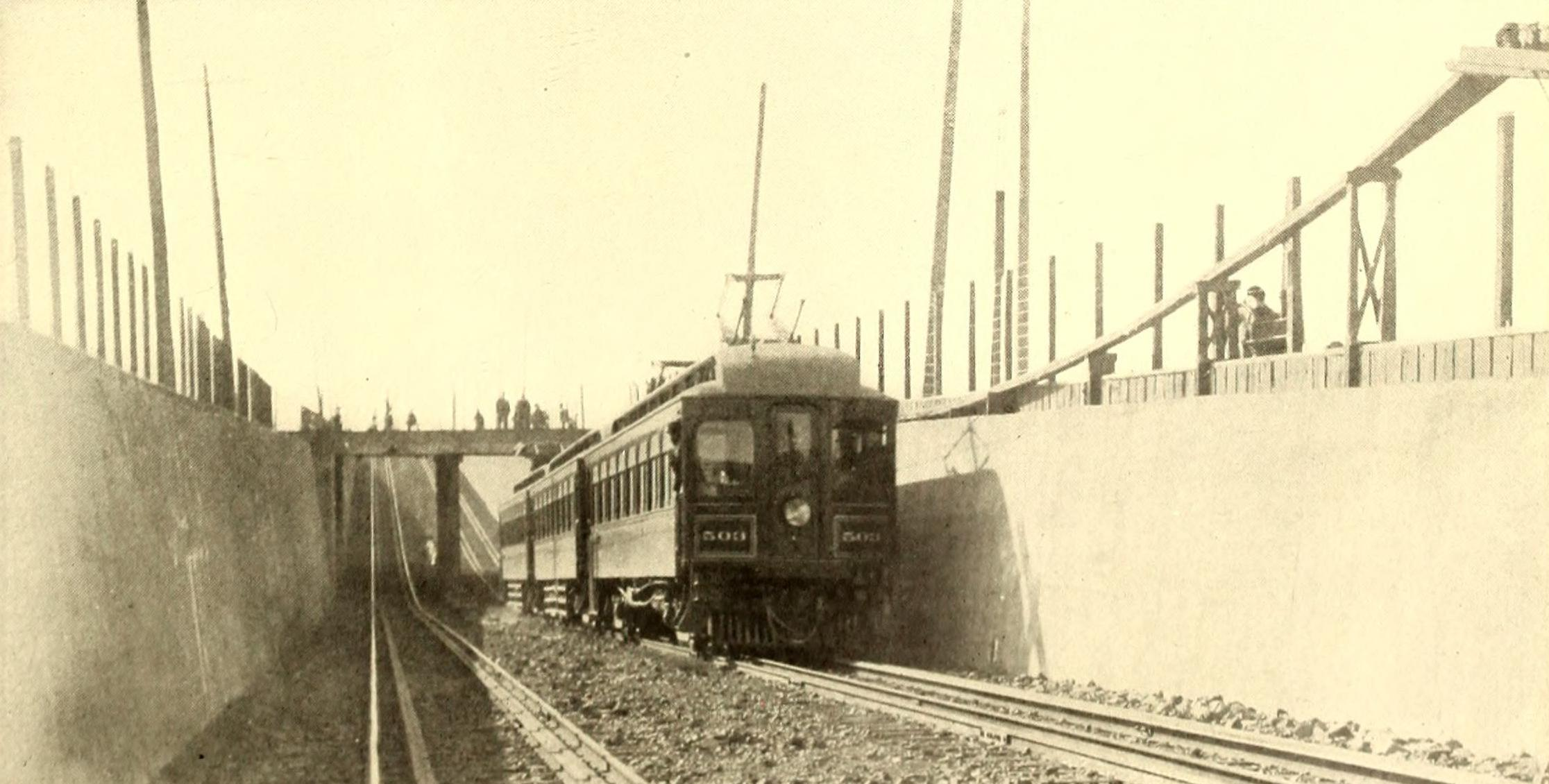
A Key System train in Emeryville, 1909, heading west to the Mole, entering the underpass ("subway") under the mainline of the Southern Pacific under construction.

Following the Great Crash of 1929, a holding company called the Railway Equipment & Realty Co. was created, with the subsidiary Key System Ltd running the commuter trains. In 1938, the name became the Key System.

During World War II, the Key System built and operated the Shipyard Railway between a transfer station in Emeryville and the Kaiser Shipyards in Richmond.

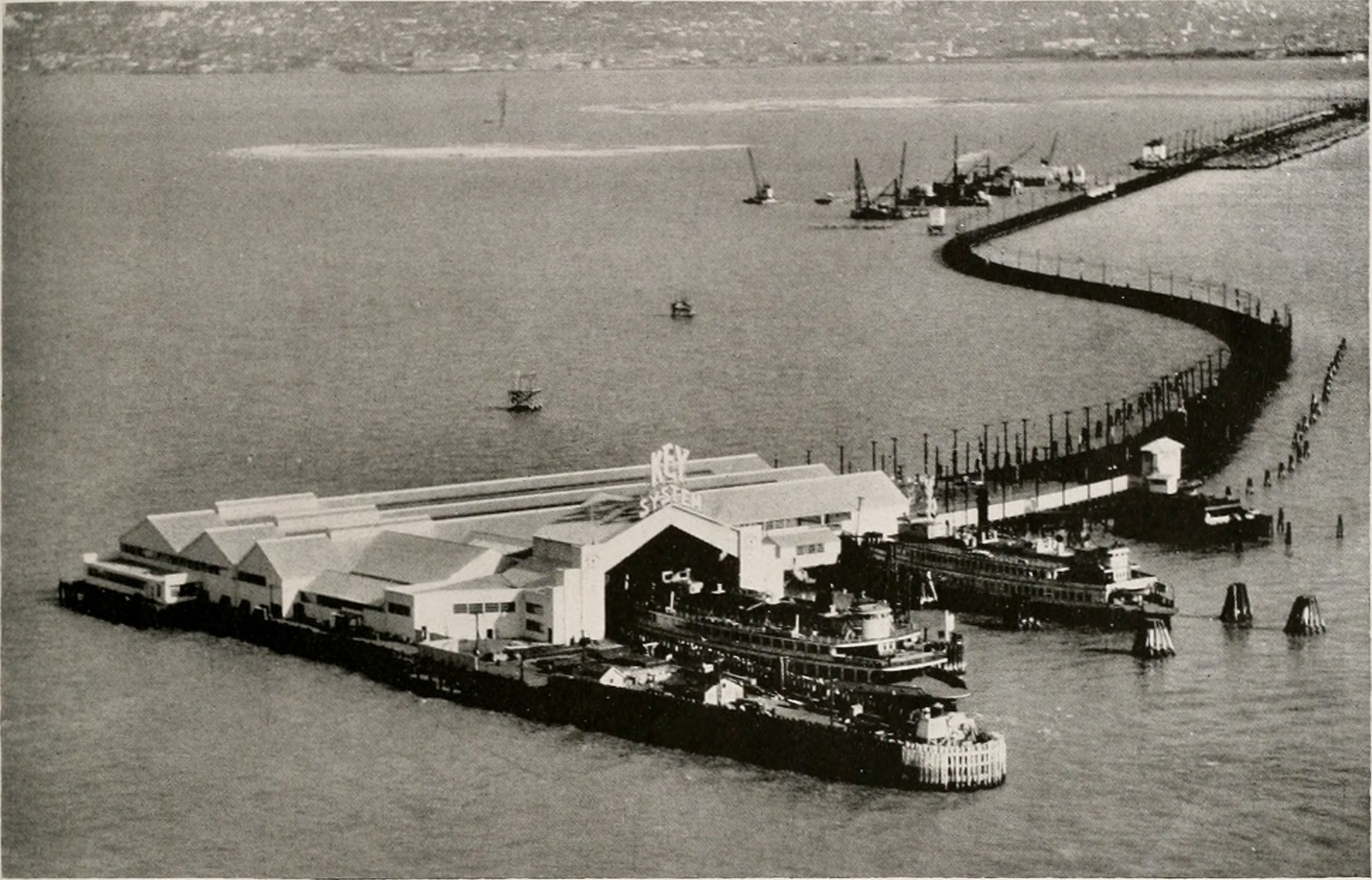
The new ferry terminal on the Key System Mole in 1933. The old ferry terminal and the end of the mole had been destroyed by a fire and explosion earlier in the year.

=== National City Lines era ===
National City Lines acquired 64% of the stock in the system in 1946.

The same year E. Jay Quinby hand published a document exposing the ownership of National City Lines (General Motors, Firestone Tire, and Phillips Petroleum). He addressed the publication to The Mayors; The City Manager; The City Transit Engineer; The members of The Committee on Mass-Transportation and The Tax-Payers and The Riding Citizens of Your Community. In it he wrote "This is an urgent warning to each and every one of you that there is a careful, deliberately planned campaign to swindle you out of your most important and valuable public utilities–your Electric Railway System".

The new owners made a number of rapid changes. In 1946 they cut back the A-1 train route and then the express trains in 1947. The company increased fares in 1946 and then in both January and November 1947. During the period there were many complaints of overcrowding.

On April 9, 1947, nine corporations and seven individuals (constituting officers and directors of certain of the corporate defendants) were indicted in the Federal District Court of Southern California on two counts: 'conspiring to acquire control of a number of transit companies, forming a transportation monopoly' and 'Conspiring to monopolize sales of buses and supplies to companies owned by National City Lines'. They were convicted of conspiring to monopolize sales of buses and supplies. They were acquitted of conspiring to monopolize the ownership of these companies.

In 1948, National City Lines proposed a plan to convert all the streetcars to buses. They placed an advertisement in the local papers explaining their plan to 'modernize' and 'motorize' Line 14. The Oakland City Council opposed the plan by 5–3. The Public Utilities Commission (PUC) supported the plan which included large fare increases. In October 1948, 700 people signed a petition with the PUC "against the Key System, seeking restoration of the bus service on the #70 Chabot Bus line". The city councils of Oakland, Berkeley and San Leandro opposed the removal of street cars. The traffic planners supported removal of the streetcar lines to facilitate movement of automobiles. Local governments in the East Bay attempted to purchase the Key System, but were unsuccessful.

Streetcars were converted to buses during November/December 1948.

In 1949, National City Lines, General Motors, and others were convicted of conspiring to monopolize the sale of buses and related products to their subsidiary transit companies throughout the U.S.

Between 1946 and 1954, transbay fares increased from 20¢ to 50¢ ($3.3 to $5.99 adjusted for inflation). Fares in this period were used to operate and for 'motorisation' which included streetcar track removal, repaving, purchase of new buses and the construction of bus maintenance facilities. Transbay ridership fell from 22.2 million in 1946 to 9.8 million in 1952.

The Key System's famed commuter train system was dismantled in 1958 after many years of declining ridership as well by the corrupt monopolistic efforts of National City Lines. The last run was on April 20, 1958. In 1960, the newly formed publicly owned AC Transit took over the Key System's facilities.

Most of the rolling stock was scrapped, with some sold to Buenos Aires, Argentina. Several streetcars, interurbans and bridge units were salvaged for collections in the United States. Of the large bridge units, three are at the Western Railway Museum near Rio Vista, California while another is at the Orange Empire Railway Museum in southern California.

== System details ==
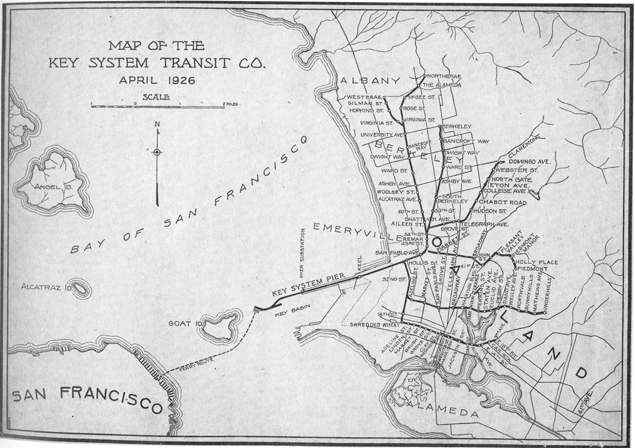
1926 map of the lines prior to the construction of the Bay Bridge

The initial connection across the Bay to San Francisco was by ferryboat via a causeway and pier ("mole"), extending from the end of Yerba Buena Avenue in Oakland, California, westward 16,000 feet (4,900 m) to a ferry terminal near Yerba Buena Island. Filling for the causeway had been started by a short-lived narrow-gauge railroad company in the late 19th century, the California and Nevada Railroad. "Borax" Smith acquired the causeway from the California and Nevada upon its bankruptcy.

On December 4, 1924, six people were killed in a train collision on the mole. On May 6, 1933, a major fire erupted on the pier end of the mole, consuming the ferry terminal building as well as gutting the ferryboat Peralta. The pier was subsequently reconstructed further south and a new terminal building erected.

The Key System operated a fleet of ferries between the Key Route Pier and the San Francisco Ferry Building until January 15, 1939, when a new dual track opened on the south side of the lower deck of the San Francisco–Oakland Bay Bridge, bringing Key System trains to the then-new Transbay Terminal in San Francisco's downtown. The bridge railway and Transbay Terminal were shared with the Southern Pacific's Interurban Electric and the Western Pacific's Sacramento Northern railroads.

The Key System's first trains were composed of standard wooden railroad passenger cars, complete with clerestory roofs. Atop each of these, a pair of pantographs, invented and manufactured by the Key System's own shops, were installed to collect current from overhead wires to power a pair of electric motors on each car, one on each truck (bogie).

The design of rolling stock changed over the years. Wood gave way to steel, and, instead of doors at each end, center doors were adopted.

The later rolling stock consisted of specially designed "bridge units" for use on the new bridge, articulated cars sharing a common central truck and including central passenger entries in each car, a forerunner of the design of most light rail vehicles today. Several of these pairs were connected to make up a train. Power pickup was via pantograph from overhead catenary wires, except on the Bay Bridge where a third rail pickup was used. The Key's trains ran on 600 volt direct current, compared to the 1200 volts used by the SP commuter trains. The cars had an enclosed operator's cab in the right front, with passenger seats extending to the very front of the vehicle, a favorite seat for many children, with dramatic views of the tracks ahead.

The exterior color of the cars was orange and silver. Interior upholstery was woven reed seat covers in one of the articulated sections, and leather in the other, the smoking section. The flooring was linoleum. During WWII, the roofs were painted gray for aerial camouflage. After acquisition by National City Lines, all Key vehicles including the bridge units were re-painted in that company's standard colors, yellow and green.

=== Transbay rail lines ===
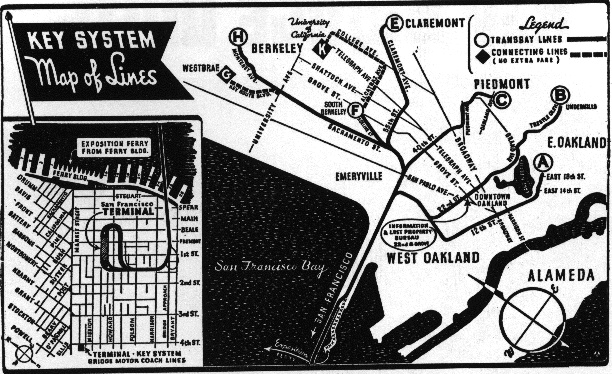
1941 Key System map with a detail of the Transbay Terminal

Until the Bay Bridge railway began operation, Key commuter trains had no letter designation. They were generally referred to by the principal street or district they served, though the Key System did not have any formal naming scheme outside of letter designations.

Line	Name	Notes
A	Downtown Oakland	Was extended to 105th Avenue East Oakland to near the San Leandro border on the East Bay Transit Company tracks along 14th Street in March 1941. Less than two weeks later in early April, the line was rerouted on its outer end over former Interurban Electric Railway trackage along Bond Street to Havenscourt. Cut back to 12th and Oak in Oakland on October 29, 1950.
B	Lakeshore and Trestle Glen	Originally ran through a Key hotel, the Key Route Inn at Grand and Broadway in Oakland; the Inn burned down in the 1930s.
C	Piedmont	Via 40th Street and Piedmont Avenue; alongside Pleasant Valley and Arroyo avenues; and between York Drive and Ricardo Avenue to terminus at Oakland Avenue. Originally terminated at Piedmont Avenue; extended to Oakland Avenue on November 21, 1924.
E	Claremont	Ran directly to the Claremont Hotel, terminating on a track between the two tennis courts; the tennis courts survive to this day
F	Berkeley / Adeline Street	Extended on former Southern Pacific interurban tracks on Shattuck Avenue beyond Dwight Way and through the SP's Northbrae Tunnel, terminating at Solano Avenue and The Alameda
G	Westbrae Shuttle	A streetcar shuttle providing a connection at University Avenue with the H transbay train. Replaced with bus service on July 26, 1941.
H	Monterey Avenue	Originally known as the Sacramento Street Line, the original line ran up Hopkins, but was switched to the SP's old tracks up Monterey after 1933. Replaced with bus service on July 26, 1941.
K	College Avenue	Streetcar shuttle providing a connection at Alcatraz Avenue and Adeline Street with the F transbay train. This line ran extra cars and was heavily used on football game days as its terminus was only a few blocks away from UC's Memorial Stadium. Replaced with bus service on September 30, 1946.

D was reserved for a proposed line into Montclair alongside the Sacramento Northern interurban railway. Shortly after opening of the Bay Bridge to train traffic, the Key System continued to use its pier for special service trains for ferry service to the 1939 Golden Gate International Exposition on Treasure Island — these were given the special designation "X". The service was discontinued at the end of the first year of the Exposition and not revived for the 1940 season.

On September 13, 1942, a stop was opened at Yerba Buena Island to serve expanded wartime needs on adjacent Treasure Island. It remained after the war until the end of all rail service on the Key System.

The A, B, C, E and F lines were the last Key System rail lines. Train service ended on April 20, 1958, replaced by buses using the same letter designations. AC Transit preserved the letter-designated routes when it took over the Key System two years later, and are still in use; AC Transit's B, C, E, F, G and H lines follow roughly the corresponding Key routes and neighborhoods.

=== East Bay Street Railways ===
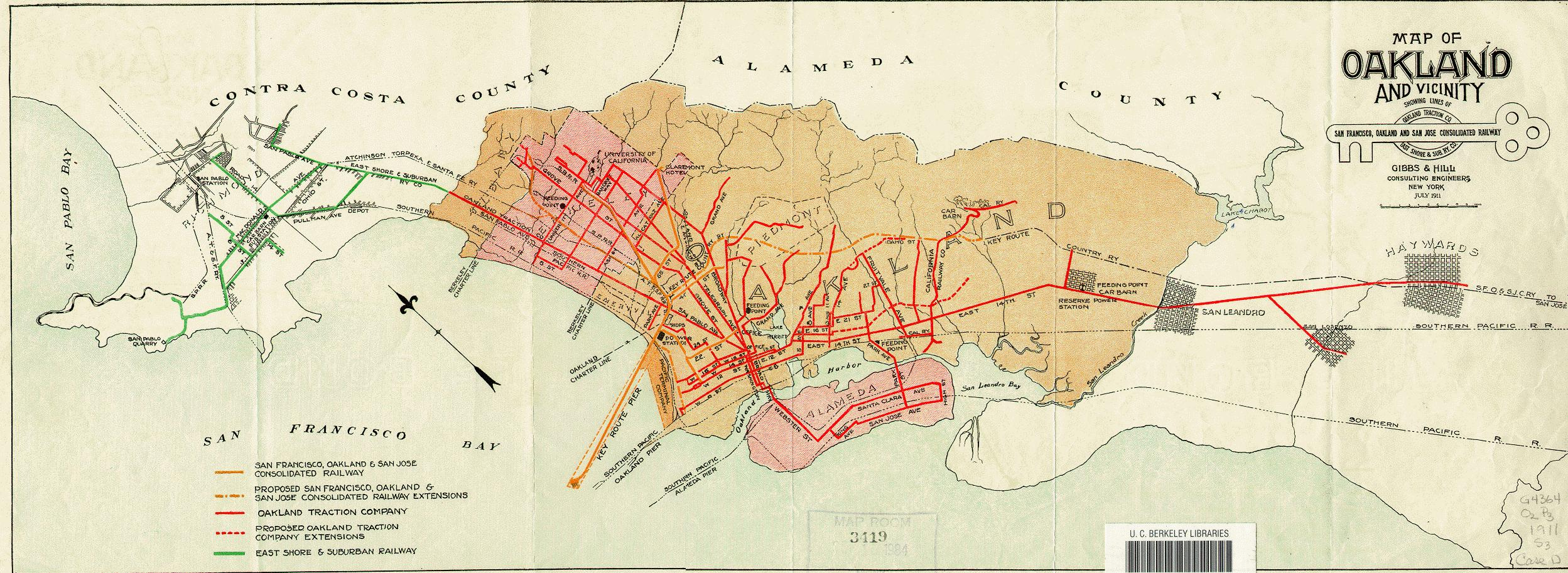
1911 map showing the various streetcar and commuter train lines that would later become the Key System

The Key System's streetcars operated as a separate division under the name "Oakland Traction Company", later changed to "East Bay Street Railways. Ltd", and finally to "East Bay Transit Co.", reflecting the increasing use of buses. Initially a separate company, it was formed by the merger of six local street railroads in 1898:

- Oakland Consolidated Street Railway
- Central Avenue Railway
- Alameda, Oakland and Piedmont
- Piedmont and Mountain View Railway
- Oakland Railroad Company
- Oakland, San Leandro and Haywards Electric Railway

The numbering of the streetcar lines changed several times over the years. The Key System's streetcars operated out of several carbarns. The Central Carhouse was on the east side of Lake Merritt on Third Avenue. The Western Carhouse was located at 51st and Telegraph Avenue in the Temescal District of Oakland. The Elmhurst Carhouse was in the east Oakland district of Elmhurst, on East 14th (International Blvd.) between 94th and 96th Avenues. The Northern Carhouse was in Richmond where today's AC Transit has a bus yard. In the early years of operation, these were supplemented by a number of smaller carbarns scattered throughout the East Bay area, many of them inherited from the pre-Key companies acquired by "Borax" Smith. The Key streetcars were originally painted dark green and cream white, then orange. They were re-painted in the green and yellow scheme of National City Lines after NCL acquired the Key System.

The Key System had ordered 40 trolley coaches from ACF-Brill in 1945 to convert the East Bay trolley lines. The new NCL management canceled the Key's trackless program in 1946 before wire changes were made, and diverted the order (some units of which had already been painted for the Key and delivered to Oakland) to its own Los Angeles Transit Lines, where they ran until 1963. The last Key streetcars ran on November 28, 1948, replaced by buses.

==== Lines ====
Line	Name	Notes
1	Oakland–105th Avenue	Line south of Oakland established by the Oakland, San Leandro and Haywards Electric Railway. Service to Hayward ended on March 10, 1935, with the outbound terminus cut back to San Leandro.
1	Santa Clara	Offered service between Downtown Oakland and Alameda via the Webster Street Bridge. Running in Alameda on Webster Street and Santa Clara Street to High Street. Abandoned October 30, 1928 with closure of the Webster Street Bridge.
2	San Pablo	Cut back to Ashby in 1933 with the start of the 72 bus line.
3	Grove	
4	Shattuck	
5	Telegraph	Former Oakland Railroad Company route.
6	College	Abandoned September 30, 1946.
7	Arlington	Began operation in April 1912.
8	Elmhurst	
9	San Jose Avenue	Branched from the 14th Street Line at 23rd Avenue, running to Alameda via Park Street, San Jose Avenue, and 9th Street until Santa Clara Street. Service abandoned west of Park and San Jose on October 30, 1928. Discontinued outright May 3, 1933 with the closure of the Park Street Bridge.
10	Piedmont–Hopkins	Designated as the A line before 1928.
11	Oakland–38th Avenue	Designated as the B line before 1928.
12	Grand	Designated as the C line before 1928.
14	East 18th	Designated as the H line before 1928.
15	38th Avenue	Abandoned March 31, 1946.
16	Leona	Acquired with purchase of the San Francisco-Oakland Terminal Railway in 1923. Assigned Line K before 1928. Discontinued April 1, 1936.
18	Lakeshore-Park Boulevard	Assigned the numeral 13 in 1928, but changed to 18 due to backlash over the original number.
22	Fruitvale Avenue	Given number designation in 1929.
23	23rd Avenue	Line established by the Oakland, San Leandro and Haywards Electric Railway. Given number designation in 1929.
24	Dwight Way	Given number designation in 1929.
25	Park Avenue	Given number designation in 1929.
26	Ninetieth Avenue	Given number designation in 1929.
27	Cemetery	Given number designation in 1929.
32	40th Street	Given number designation in 1929.
33	Sacramento Street	Given number designation in 1929.
	High Street Loop	Served a circle route of Park, San Jose, High, and Santa Clara in Alameda. Abandoned October 30, 1928.

=== Related rail systems ===
- The Key System organized its freight business in 1929 as the Key Terminal Railway, Ltd. In 1938, the name was changed to the Oakland Terminal Railroad, Ltd. In 1943 the Oakland Terminal Railroad was jointly purchased by the Western Pacific Railroad and the Atchison, Topeka and Santa Fe Railway and is now known as the Oakland Terminal Railway.
- The East Shore and Suburban Railway (E&SR) was a formerly independent unit of the Key System which ran streetcar trains in Richmond, San Pablo, and El Cerrito. Service to Oakland required a transfer to Oakland Traction Company trains at the County Line station and service to San Francisco required an additional transfer.
- See also the East Bay Electric Lines; another transbay commuter rail system operated by the Southern Pacific in the East Bay until 1941.
- See also the Sacramento Northern Railroad, an interurban system running from Chico through Sacramento to Oakland which also used some of the Key System's trackage as well as the Key System's ferry pier, and later ran to the Transbay Terminal until 1941.

=== Other properties ===
From the beginning, the Key System had been conceived as a dual real estate and transportation system. "Borax" Smith and his partner Frank C. Havens first established a company called the "Realty Syndicate" which acquired large tracts of undeveloped land throughout the East Bay. The Realty Syndicate also built two large hotels, each served by a San Francisco-bound train, the Claremont and the Key Route Inn, and a popular amusement park in Oakland called Idora Park. Streetcar lines were also routed to serve all these properties, thereby enhancing their value. In its early years, the Key System was actually a subsidiary of the Realty Syndicate. Berkeley's numerous paths, lanes, walks and steps, were put in place in many of the newly developed neighborhoods, often in the middle of a city block, so that commuters could walk more directly to the new train system. Berkeley's pathways are still maintained by local groups.

== Legacy ==
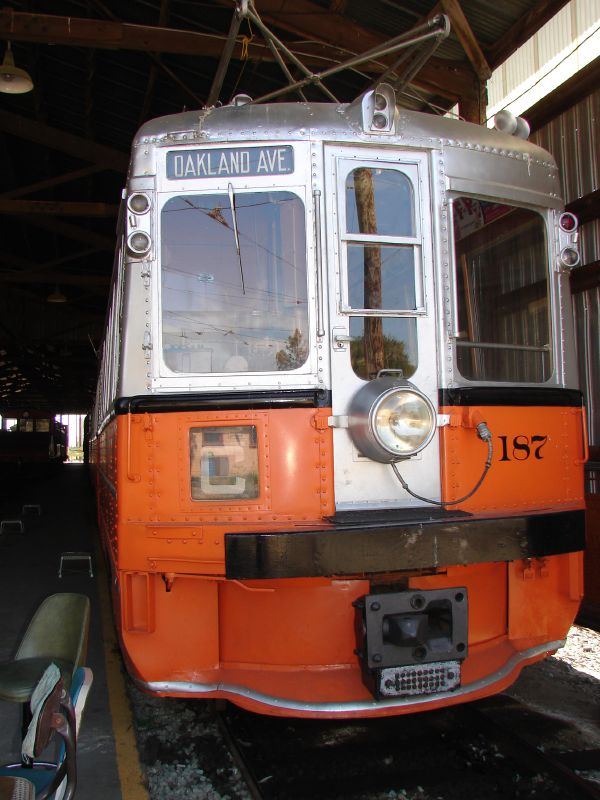
Key System car #187 preserved at Western Railway Museum.

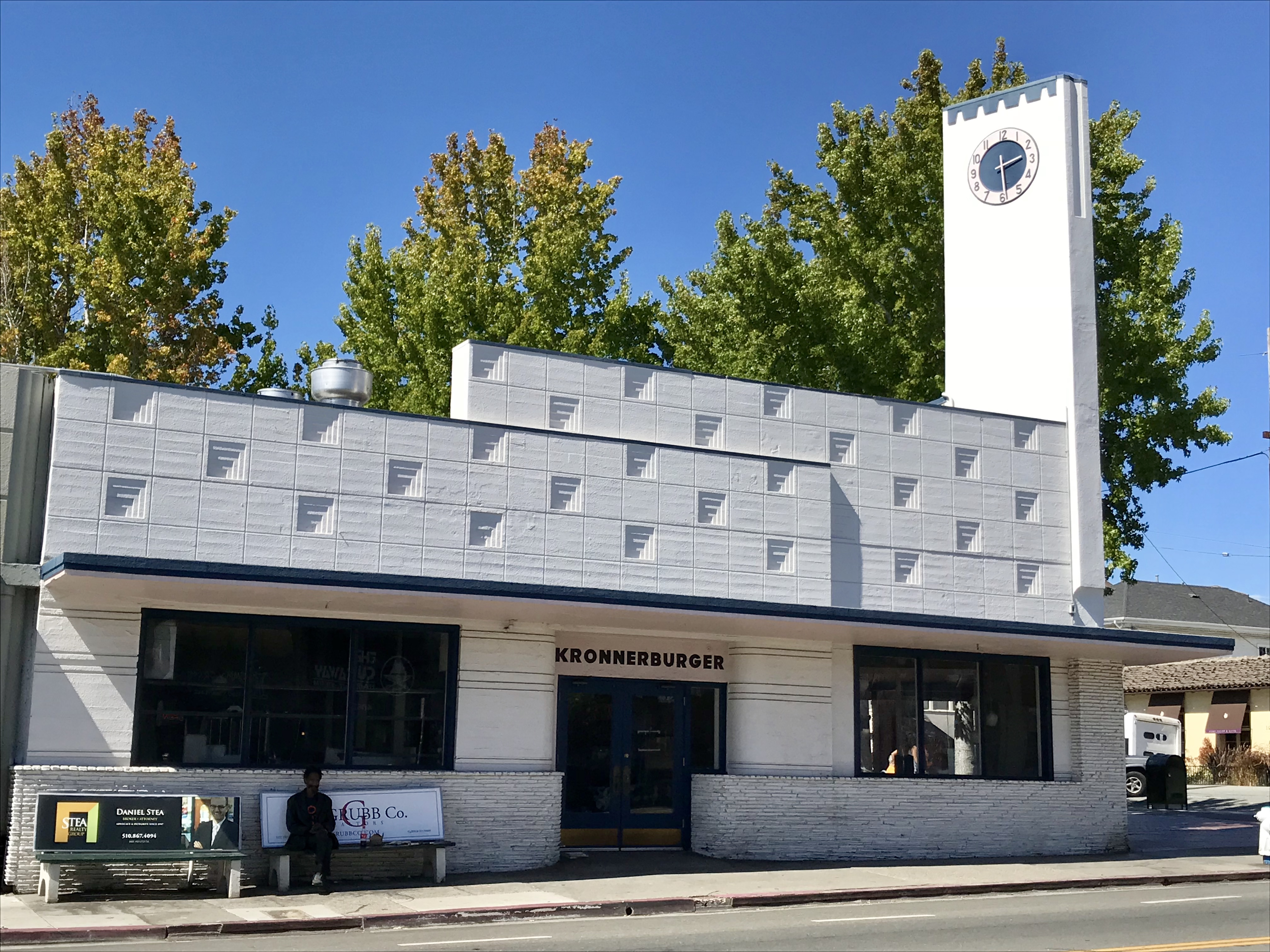
The former Key System train station on Piedmont Avenue in Oakland

Signs of the system still remain:

- The south wall of the lower level (today's eastbound lanes) of the Yerba Buena Tunnel, connecting the two spans of the Bay Bridge, still contains the as-built "deadman holes", regularly spaced refuge bays into which railway workers could duck whenever a train came along.
- The eastern end of the San Francisco–Oakland Bay Bridge sits on landfill which was added to the northern edge of the causeway which carried the Key System railbed to the ferry piers.
- The tunnel that Key System trains used to cross under the Southern Pacific (now Union Pacific and Amtrak) tracks to the mole and later the Bay Bridge still exists. It is visible from the Alexander Zuckerman Bike Path, the ramps of the Macarthur Maze, and at the southwest end of the Target store property in Emeryville, a locale that was once part of the Key System yards and shops.
- A stretch of road in Albany that was built with a wide median for a planned extension (never constructed) of the "G" Westbrae line is named Key Route Boulevard.
- The Claremont Hotel, built by a Key System affiliate company, The Realty Syndicate, survives as the Claremont Resort. It was the terminus of the "E" transbay line.
- The Realty Syndicate Building at 1440 Broadway was built in 1912 and housed "Borax" Smith and Frank C. Havens's Realty Syndicate that created the Key System. It is listed on the National Historic Register.
- The Key System's subsequent administrative headquarters building, built as the Security Bank and Trust Company Building in 1914, exists at 1100 Broadway in downtown Oakland and is listed on the National Register of Historic Places. The building suffered some damage in the 1989 Loma Prieta earthquake and is as of June 2020 unoccupied, although there are plans for the building to be rehabilitated by a developer constructing a larger new building adjacent to it.
- A building which has been converted for restaurant use at 41st Street and Piedmont Avenue in Oakland is the partial remnant of what was formerly a covered stop for trains on the C-line. (The tracks followed 40th Street, crossed Howe Street and curved through the parking lot behind Piedmont Avenue shops, then merged onto Piedmont Avenue at 41st Street and headed toward Pleasant Valley Avenue.) Old photos of the Key System are on the walls of the restaurant, as well as a partial mural (painted in 2005 and partially removed in 2014) of Key System images on one of its outside walls.
- The old Key System Piedmont shops building at Bay Place and Harrison is now a Whole Foods Market retail store. This building was originally built in 1890 as the powerhouse and car barn of the Piedmont Cable Car Co. In the 1920s, it was substantially remodeled and used as a Cadillac showroom which closed in the mid-1990s. The building sat vacant until 2003, when Whole Foods initiated a radical interior redesign while retaining and restoring much of the facade.
- The bus yards of today's AC Transit in Emeryville and Richmond were originally the bus yards of the Key System. The Richmond yard was also previously the site of the Northern Carhouse of the Key streetcar system.
- Several streetcars and bridge trains from the Key System are preserved at the Western Railway Museum at Rio Vista Junction in Solano County, as well as a Bridge Unit at the Southern California Railway Museum in Perris, California and a streetcar at Seashore Trolley Museum in Kennebunk, Maine.
- One of the 0-4-0 Steam locomotives used to push the trains during power outages is on display at the Redwood Valley Railway. It had a brief stint on the currently re-constructing Virginia and Truckee Railroad in Virginia City, Nevada. Here, the mountain grades proved too taxing for the little locomotive. It was later replaced by 2–8–0 Steam locomotive No. 29.
- Although built by the Southern Pacific Railroad, the Key System inherited the Northbrae Tunnel right-of-way, which it operated from 1942 through 1958. It was converted to street use and opened to auto traffic on December 15, 1962.
- Located at the former Oakland Army Base site, The Interurban Electric Railway Bridge Yard Shop Building, was used as a maintenance facility for the Key System electric trains. Today, the building is now known as the Bridge Yard Building and is used as a venue for events as part of the Judge John Sutter Regional Shoreline. A substation located at the site also provided electrical power to all the Key System trains.
- A footpath between York Drive and Ricardo Avenue, which provided access to the Holly Place stop on the C line, is still in use.
- Abandoned tracks on Louise Street and Poplar Street in Oakland, used by the A and B lines, were rebuilt in 1958 and used for freight until 1999.

== See also ==
- Ferries of San Francisco Bay
- Transportation in Oakland, California

== Bibliography ==
- Allen, Annalee; Clausen, Edmund (2005). Oakland. Arcadia Publishing. ISBN 9780738530147.
- Demoro, Harre W. (1985). The Key Route: Transbay Commuting by Train and Ferry, Part 1. Interurbans Specials. Vol. 95. Glendale, California: Interurban Press. ISBN 0-916374-66-1.
- Demoro, Harre W. (1985). The Key Route: Transbay Commuting by Train and Ferry, Part 2. Interurbans Specials. Vol. 97. Glendale, California: Interurban Press. ISBN 0-916374-68-8. OL 2865715M.
- Duke, Donald (1999). Bay Area Rapid Transit – East Bay Transit – Interurban Electric (SP) – Key System. Electric Railways Around San Francisco Bay. Vol. 1. San Marino, California: Golden West Books. ISBN 0-87095-115-7.
- Harrison, James H. (2006). Key System Gallery. Shade Tree Books. ISBN 0-930742-30-3.
- Rice, Walter; Echeverria, Emiliano (2007). The Key System: San Francisco and the Eastshore Empire. Images of Rail. Charleston, South Carolina: Arcadia Publishing. ISBN 978-0-7385-4722-0.
- Sappers, Vernon J., ed. (1948). From Shore to Shore: The Key Route. Peralta Associates.
- Sappers, Vernon J. (2007). Key System Streetcars: Transit, Real Estate and the Growth of the East Bay. Wilton, California: Signature Press. ISBN 978-1-930013-07-0.
- Smythe, Dallas Walker (1937). An Economic History of Local and Interurban Transportation in the East Bay Cities with Particular Reference to the Properties Developed by F. M. Smith. Berkeley: University of California.
- Ute, Grant; Singer, Bruce (2007). Alameda by Rail. Arcadia Publishing. ISBN 9780738547060.
- Walker, Jim (1977). The Yellow Cars of Los Angeles. Interurbans Specials. Vol. 43. Glendale, California: Interurban Press. ISBN 0-916374-25-4.
- Walker, Jim (1978). Key System Album. Interurbans Specials. Vol. 68. Glendale, California: Interurban Press. ISBN 0-916374-31-9. OL 4742432M.
