= Westbrae, Berkeley, California =

Streetcar suburb in Berkeley, California

Westbrae
- Neighborhood
- Interactive map of Westbrae
- Coordinates: 37°52′46″N 122°17′21″W
- Country: United States
- State: California
- City: Berkeley
- Region: East Bay
- Metropolitan area: San Francisco Bay Area
- Elevation: 79 ft (24 m)
- Time zone: UTC−8 (Pacific Time Zone)
  - Summer (DST): UTC−7 (PDT)
- Area code(s): 510, 341

Westbrae is a neighborhood in the northern part of Berkeley, California in the East Bay section of the San Francisco Bay Area. Westbrae is "centered" on the intersection of Santa Fe Avenue and Gilman Street, although the main extent is east, south and west of this intersection, with the Albany city limit only a short distance north. It lies at an elevation of 79 feet (24 m). The neighborhood is mainly residential, with a small commercial section along Gilman Street between Santa Fe Ave. and Tevlin Street. In the past, the neighborhood’s businesses consisted primarily of liquor and grocery stores, but it now hosts several small restaurants, a natural food store, bakeries, and a nursery. The elevated tracks of the BART Richmond line cut diagonally across Westbrae, crossing over Gilman in the commercial section. There is a church, the Evangel Bible Church of Berkeley (formerly the Westbrae Bible Church), located about three blocks from the center of the Westbrae neighborhood, on the corner of Hopkins Street and Ordway Street.

Until about 1979, the tracks of the Santa Fe railroad ran beside where the BART elevated and underground lines are today. Today, the Ohlone Greenway, a bicycle and pedestrian path, follows the old right-of-way. Paralleling the Santa Fe tracks to the east were the tracks of the Key System's G-Westbrae line. The "G" terminated at a small station just short of the city limits at Codornices Creek. The origin of Westbrae is directly connected to the Key System. The Key System was part of a larger enterprise which included real estate, the Realty Syndicate. The name "Westbrae" was given by the Key System developers and included tracts north of Codornices Creek in Albany. A street through the heart of this area remains named the "Key Route Boulevard,” and gestures to this history. There were future plans to extend the G-Westbrae line northward to serve the development area, but this never happened. The "G" remained a trolley shuttle between the terminal near Gilman and Santa Fe, connecting with the H transbay line at Sacramento Street and University Avenue instead of being extended and transformed into a full-fledged transbay line of its own. AC Transit operates a Transbay express bus line along Key Route designated G, and also an H line to this day; the designations are inherited from the Key System lines.
