= Oakland, San Leandro and Haywards Electric Railway =

California railroad

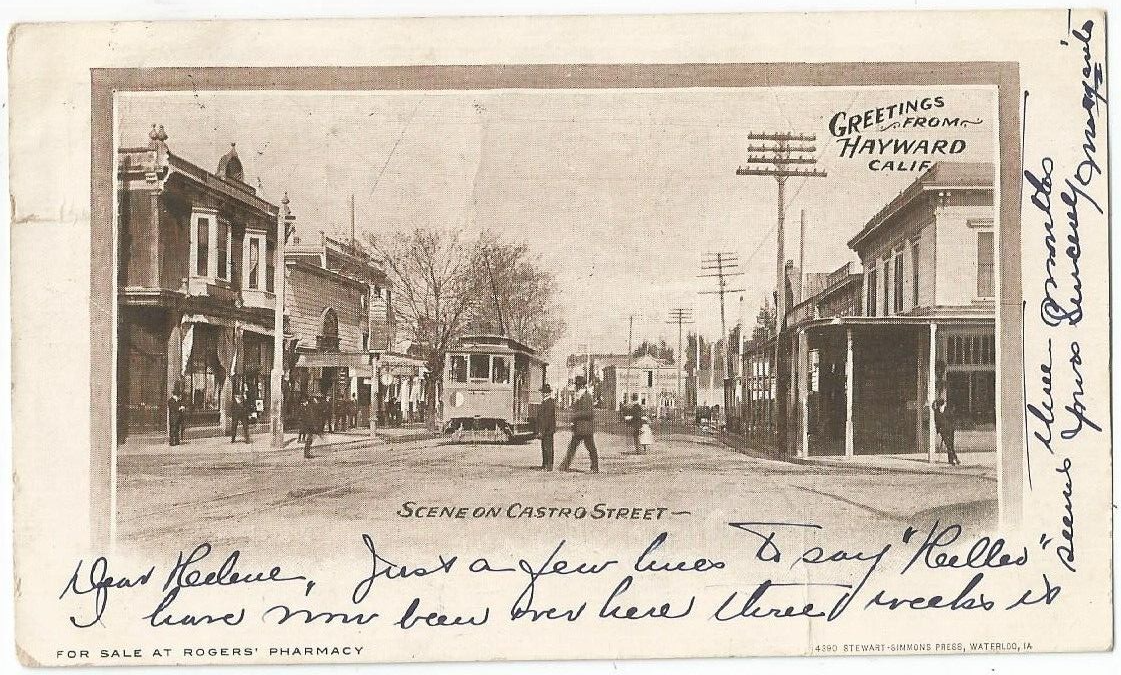
A streetcar running on Castro Street in Hayward, postcard postmarked 1906

The Oakland, San Leandro and Haywards Electric Railway (OSL&H) was an electric street railroad in the East Bay of California. It connected Haywards to Oakland along the 14th Street and Mission Boulevard. Tracks were laid with a narrow gauge of 3 feet 8 inches (1,118 mm) using 35-pound rails, with operations beginning in May 1892. Transfers were made available to the Highland Park and Fruit Vale Railroad Company's cars, and to the cars of the Central Avenue Railway streetcar line. Oakland's terminus was extended to First and Washington the following March. A new company was established to build the 23rd Avenue branch, which would be absorbed into the OSL&H in 1894. Between September 1901 and May 1906 the California Railway line to Leona Heights was dual gauged to allow interchange with the OS&H. By 1907, the line had been converted to standard gauge except for one mile of tracks leading into downtown Haywards, which was similarly converted the following year.

Starting in 1896, the railway inaugurated the country's first piggybacking freight service. The company stationed horse-drawn wagons in San Francisco which gathered up parcels during the day, rode those to a depot, loaded those into heavier and larger wagons, and then sent on ferry running to Oakland. In Oakland, the wagons were driven two blocks and loaded into a waiting express train of flat cars specially designed for the transportation of loaded wagons. Upon arrival at the destination towns, the wagons were lowered from the cars and unloaded normally. A special electric locomotive was built at the company's shops in Elmhurst to pull the train of loaded cars. The car was designed to be capable of pulling a 30-ton load over a 5% grade, though was given the outward appearance similar to the passenger cars on the line, in this way inviting less criticism by reason of the train passing through the principal business streets. This service was very short lived, ending in March of that year.

The company passed into the hands of Oakland Transit Company in 1901. Service in Hayward ended on March 10, 1935, though tracks were retained in Oakland as far as 105th Avenue for local Key System streetcars.

== Route ==
The Oakland, San Leandro and Haywards Electric line began at First and Washington Streets in Oakland. At Washington and Thirteenth streets it ran eastward beyond the city limit, and along the county road through Pittsville, Melrose, Fitchburg, Elmhurst, San Leandro, to Hayward. At San Lorenzo Junction a branch road terminated at San Lorenzo Grove. Another branch passed up Twenty-third avenue.

== Rolling stock ==
In 1893, the company experimented with a gas motor which had been rejected by the Cahuenga Valley Railroad.

== See also ==
- Tempo (bus rapid transit) — modern descendant of the service
