= Leona Line =

16 Leona

Overview
- Status: Dismantled
- Locale: Oakland, California, U.S.

Service
- Type: Streetcar
- System: Key System

History
- Opened: May 19, 1888
- Closed: April 1, 1936

Technical
- Track gauge: 1,435 mm (4 ft 8 1/2 in)
- Electrification: Overhead line, 600 V DC (after 1896)

The Leona Line was a railway line in Oakland, California. It was known as the California Railway early in existence and went through many corporate reorganizations to eventually became the 16 Leona line of the Key System. (Note: This railroad line was known by many names and permutations, especially early in its history. One article from 1889 listed seven: the Alameda County Terminal Railroad; the Alameda County Railroad; the Oakland, Alameda and Laundry Farm Railroad; the Woodard Short Line; the de Golia Short Line; the Denig Short Line; and the York Short Line.) Constructed as an independent steam railroad in 1888, the line would go on to be electrified and integrated into the East Bay streetcar network. It ran from Fruitvale station into the Oakland Hills to Leona and Laundry Canyon. The line transported large quantities of quarried stone and rock even into its life as a trolley service. Service ceased in 1936 and the line was dismantled.

== Route ==
The road ran from the junction of the Southern Pacific a Fruitvale to Leona Heights, passing on the way Mills College. Courtland Avenue was built on several portions of the line.

== History ==
The line was established as the Alameda County Railway, a steam railroad intended to drive development in the area. A short segment of the route opened on May 19, 1888 using equipment borrowed from Southern Pacific. It was extended to the north side of Mills Seminary that September, and again the following April. The company then intended to further extend the line through a new tunnel into Laundry Farm Canyon and construction commenced immediately. Bad storms that June caused large washouts along the line, and Southern Pacific brought suit against the railroad for damage incurred to their rolling stock while under lease. The company was reorganized as Alameda County Terminal Railway, but the cave-in of the incomplete tunnel in early 1890 put even further strains on the company and it went into receivership.

The California Railway took over the line, extending the tracks by diverting around the tunnel and into Laundry Farm Canyon. The line was connected to quarries via industrial tramways which supplied the line with freight traffic in rock and gravel. In 1892, the company purchased the Alameda Horse Car Railroad and went on to electrify it the following year under the name Alameda, Oakland and Piedmont Electric Railroad. Electrification of the original line was completed by June 6, 1896. Further extensions on both ends brought the termini to Park Street in Alameda and the Leona Heights Hotel, but both of these would be short lived. The north end was truncated to the car barn at Leona while the south end was cleaved by construction of the canal connecting Oakland Estuary to San Leandro Bay.

Between September 1901 and May 1906 the line was dual gauged to allow interchange with the Oakland, San Leandro and Haywards Electric Railway before that railroad was converted to standard gauge. An extension in 1905 brought the line to Ransome Crummey quarry.

Oakland Traction Company acquired the company in November 1906. As more resources were discovered in the area, and additional spurs and conveyances were constructed to furnish freight on the line, including a conveyor belt and aerial tramway. On January 10, 1910, Leona Heights trips were extended to Downtown Oakland. Two cars collided on the curve at Bellevue station on Memorial Day of that year, killing four and injuring several others. As a result of the wreck, a mile of second track was added north of 14th Street and a passing siding installed at Talcott station to reduce potential interactions. The line changed hands again in 1912 with the consolidation of the Oakland Traction Company; East Shore and Suburban Railway; California Railway; and San Francisco, Oakland and San Jose under name San Francisco-Oakland Terminal Railway. On January 13, 1915, the line was assigned the number 21; this was changed to the letter K in September.

After the San Francisco-Oakland Terminal Railway went into receivership in 1923, the line came under the purview of the Key System. Most tracks south of 14th Street were sold to Southern Pacific in 1925. The line was re-designated as number 16, signed for Leona, in 1925. Passenger service along the line ceased on April 1, 1936. Freight stopped running a few weeks later and the tracks were dismantled in June. A paralleling bus service replaced the line, running on Knoll, Mountain, Calaveras, Tompkins, High Street, and 46th Street to Melrose station.

== Freight ==
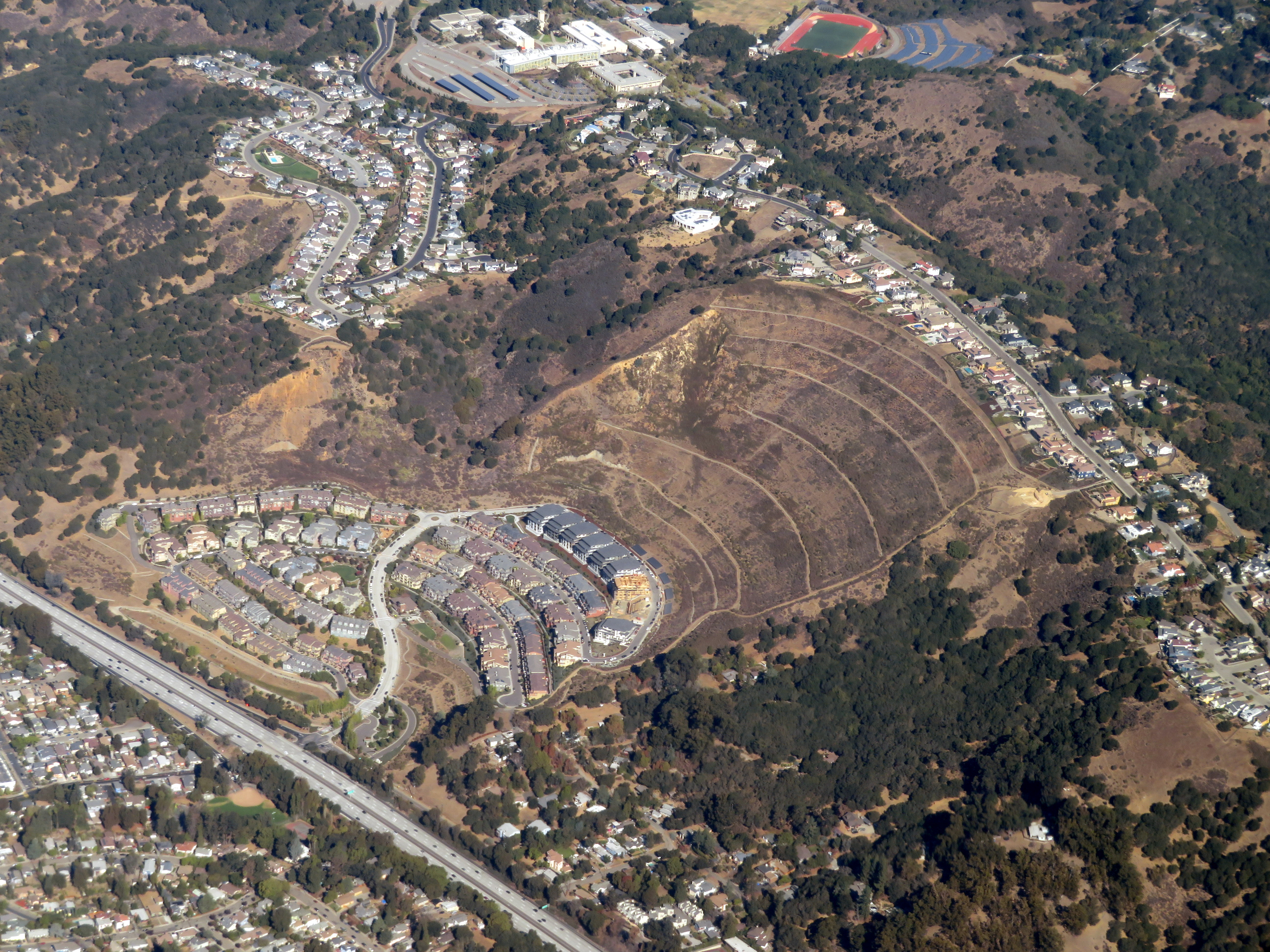
Aerial view of the Monte Vista Villas development in the former Leona Quarry in October 2020

The line handled an unusually high volume of bulk freight for an electrified trolley line. Early trains were run with steam power, but the railroad would go on to utilize electric rolling stock which had more in common with steam railroads. With its initial push into Laundry Farm Canyon, the line was immediately transporting quarried stone to the Southern Pacific east shore line and the main line would eventually reach Ransome-Crummey quarry itself. Sulfur was discovered at Leona in 1910 and an aerial tramway constructed for moving it to the line. A long conveyor belt as also built for transporting rock to trains. The line additionally handled US Mail for nearly its whole existence.

== Rolling stock ==
Early electrified cars were standard steam cars which were adapted for electric operation. Key System #1001, built in 1910, was used on the line as it could handle truckloads of rock.
