= Key Route Inn =

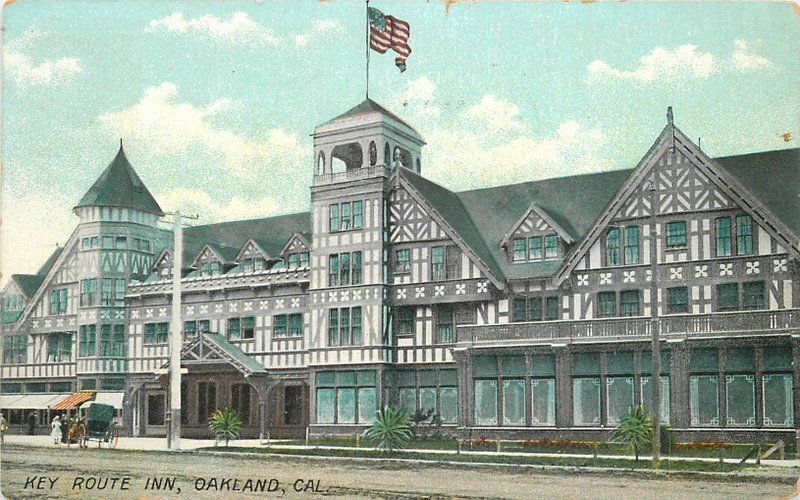
- Key Route Inn on a 1908 postcard
- Interactive map of the Key Route Inn area

General information
- Status: Destroyed
- Type: Hotel
- Location: Oakland, California, United States
- Coordinates: 37.8114°N 122.2667°W
- Opened: March 1907
- Destroyed: May 1932

The Key Route Inn was a major hotel in Oakland, California in the early decades of the 20th century. It was constructed by the Realty Syndicate of Francis "Borax" Smith and Frank C. Havens, a subsidiary of which was the Key Route transit system. The Inn opened on May 7, 1907, straddling what is now West Grand Avenue along the west side of Broadway in present-day Uptown Oakland. President William Howard Taft and his party were guests in 1909. The building was a massive wood-framed structure with open timbering, in imitation of an old English style. One of its most remarkable features was a large archway and corridor into which the tracks of one of the Key Route's transbay lines (the 22nd Street line) passed. A Key Route stop in this corridor connected to the hotel's main lobby. Initially, the lobby stop was the terminus of the line to the Key ferry pier (the mole), but in 1919-20 the line was extended across Broadway to the developing Trestle Glen neighborhood.

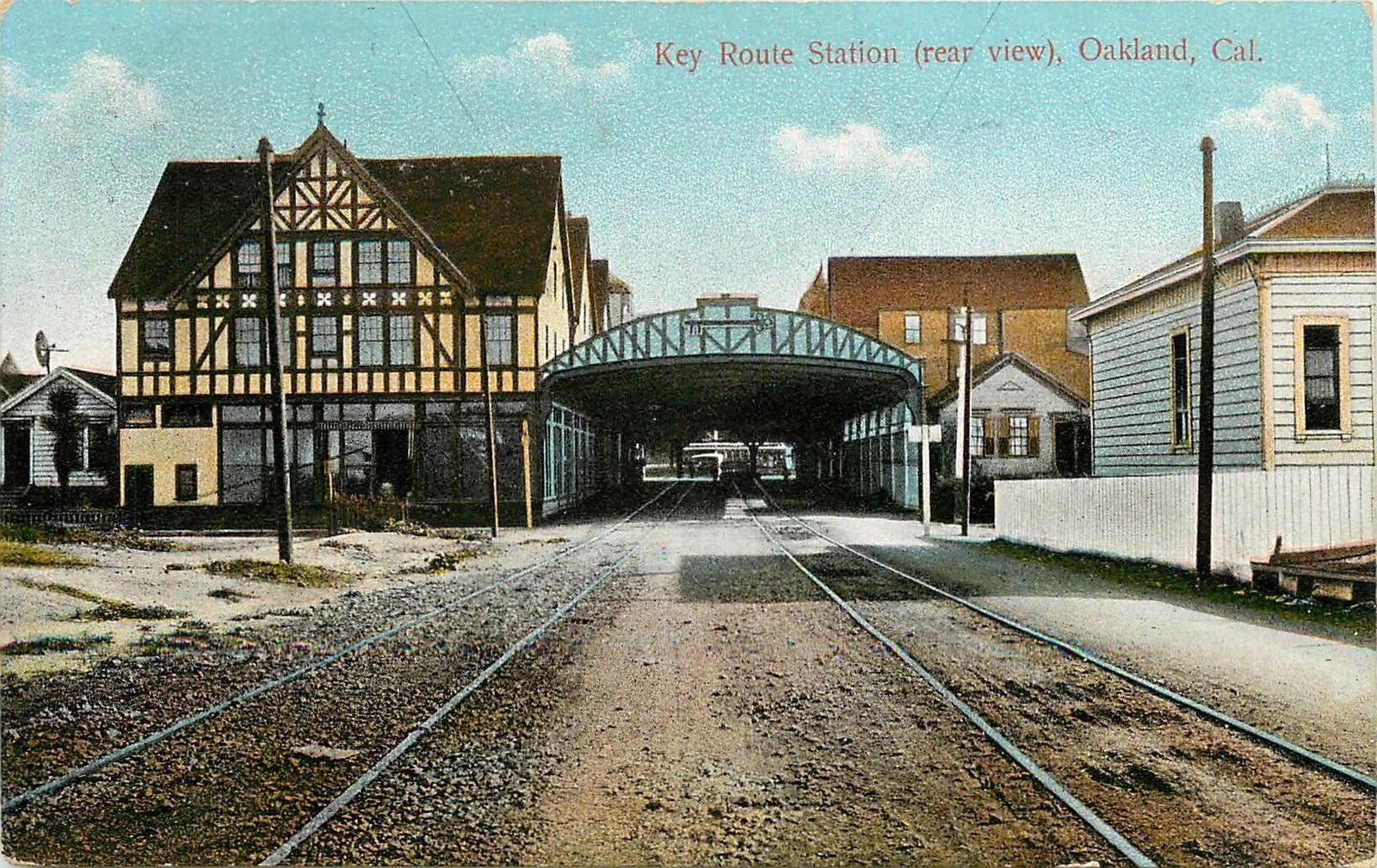
The rear of the hotel showing the Key System stop

The Key Route Inn suffered major fire damage on September 8, 1930. This, combined with the beginning of the Great Depression and the City of Oakland's desire to connect Grand Avenue with 22nd Street led to the Inn being fully demolished in April and May, 1932, only 25 years after it opened.

The rail line continued, however, becoming the "B" transbay line upon the opening of the San Francisco–Oakland Bay Bridge railway. The rail line was replaced by the "B" bus route in April 1958, and was subsequently incorporated into the publicly owned AC Transit system; the modern line B route bypasses the location of the former hotel by nearly a mile.

Preceding station	Key System	Following station
Grove toward Transbay Terminal	B	Harrison toward Underhill

== See also ==
- Claremont Hotel & Spa, a sister hotel opened in 1915 which still exists.
