= Judge John Sutter Regional Shoreline =

Park in Oakland, California

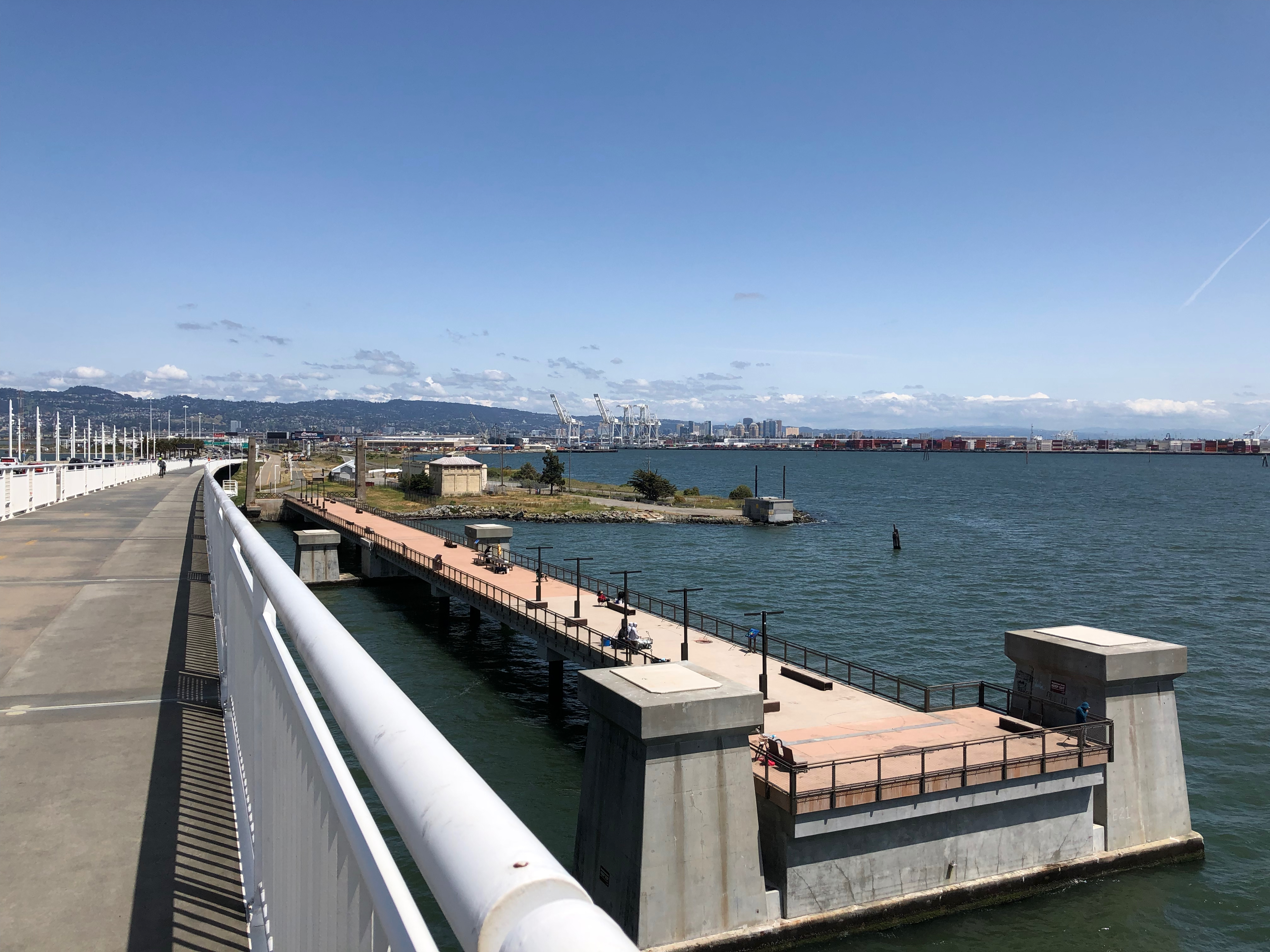
- Observation Pier seen from Bay Bridge
- Interactive map of Judge John Sutter Regional Shoreline
- Type: Regional Shoreline
- Location: Alameda County, California, United States
- Nearest city: Oakland, California
- Coordinates: 37°49′19″N 122°19′12″W
- Area: 22.47 acres (0.0909 km^{2})
- Created: 2020
- Operator: East Bay Regional Park District
- Status: Open

Judge John Sutter Regional Shoreline is a park located in Oakland, California along the shore of San Francisco Bay at the foot of the San Francisco-Oakland Bay Bridge. It is part of the East Bay Regional Park District. The park opened on October 21, 2020.

== History ==
From 1903 to the early 1940s, the site of the park was the east end of the Key System mole, a long causeway and pier which once extended nearly to Yerba Buena Island. Key System trains ran the length of the mole to the ferry slips where transbay commuters transferred between trains and ferryboats. During the construction of the Bay Bridge in the 1930s, the site was transformed for the planned bridge railway on the lower deck of the Bay Bridge, to be used by the Southern Pacific, Sacramento Northern and the Key System. Service over the bridge railway commenced in January 1939. A substation located at the site provided electrical power to all the Key System trains. The 1930s-era industrial Interurban Electric Railway Bridge Yard Shop building was a maintenance center for the electric trains.

In 1941, the Department of the Army established the Oakland Army Base at the site as a transportation port and distribution terminal. For 60 years, it served as an entry and return point for supplies, equipment, and soldiers that served in World War II, the Korean War, the Vietnam War, Operation Desert Shield, and Operation Desert Storm. The base closed in 1999.

The idea of the park was conceived by former Park District Board Member John Sutter, who first proposed the concept of a waterfront park at the then current Oakland Army Base in a 1967 letter to the Association of Bay Area Governments. The park is the culmination of decades of cooperation between a nine member consortium of local, regional, and state agencies, which included the City of Oakland, the Association of Bay Area Governments, the East Bay Regional Park District, and the California Department of Transportation.

The park is named after Judge John Sutter, an East Bay civic and environmental leader who led a long career as a superior court judge, as Oakland's vice mayor, and as former East Bay Regional Park District Director. He was the president and a founding member of Citizens for Regional Recreation and Parks and was instrumental in obtaining and preserving public access to the bay shoreline.

== Park features ==
The park features the restored Bridge Yard building, which serves as a hub for activity and as a venue for public events and conferences. The 24,000 square foot, 1930s era building serves as a space for recreational programming and events.

Made from the existing foundations of the old eastern span of the Bay Bridge, the park has a 600-foot long observation pier with views of the bay and the bridge. The pier also provides public waterfront access for fishing.

With the opening of the park, improved parking and pedestrian access has made it easier to access the Alexander Zuckermann Bay Bridge Trail. Opened in 2016, the cyclist and pedestrian trail is part of the San Francisco Bay Trail and extends across the Bay Bridge to both Yerba Buena and Treasure Island.
