= E (AC Transit) =

Bus service in Oakland and San Leandro, California

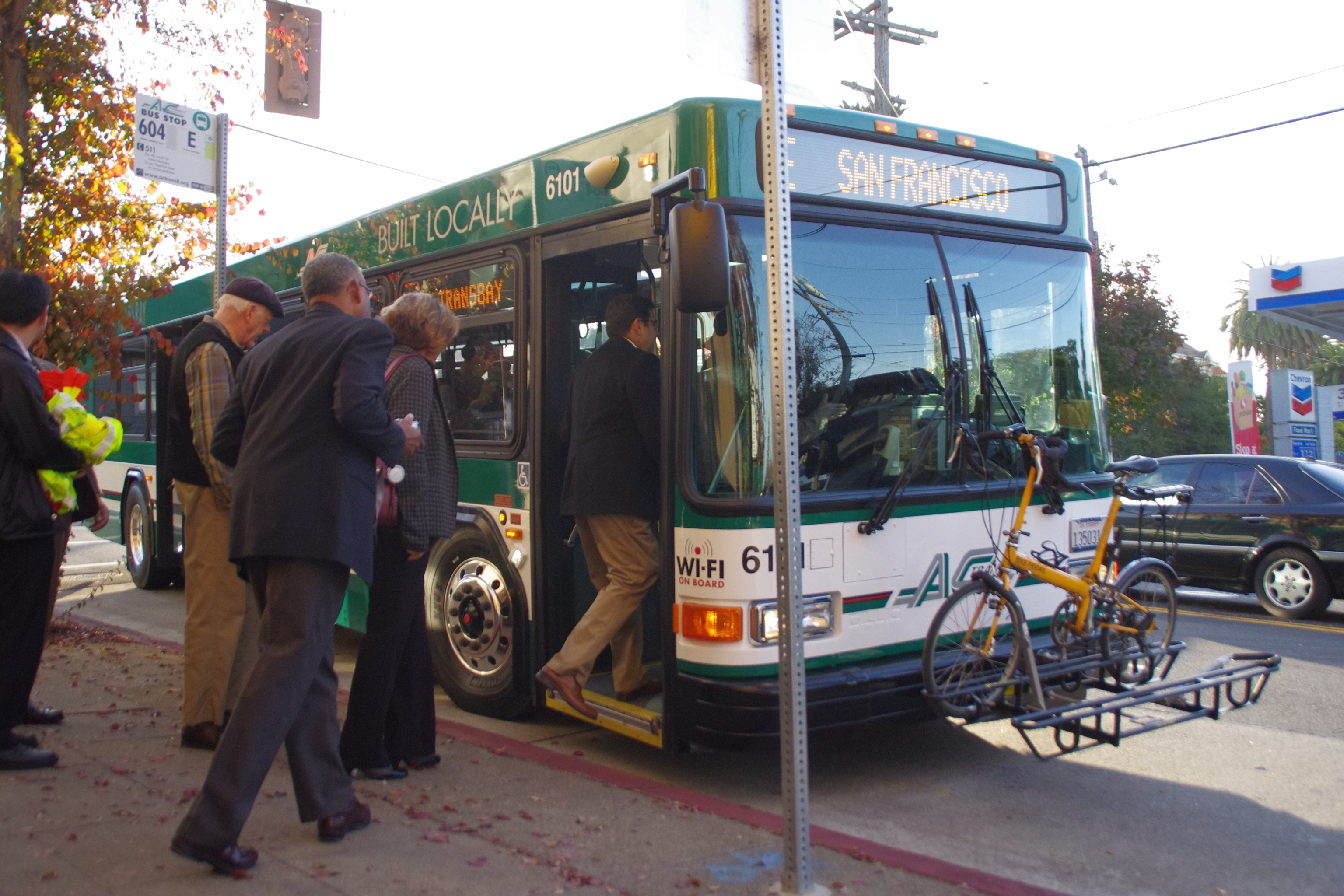
- Loading at Ashby & Domingo, 2013

Overview
- Operator: Key System (1906–1960); AC Transit (1960–present)

Route
- Locale: Oakland, Claremont, San Francisco
- Start: Caldecott & Parkwood Community
- Via: Claremont, Tunnel
- End: Salesforce Transit Center
- Stations: 10
- Timetable: E
- Map: E

The E is a bus service operated by AC Transit in the San Francisco Bay Area. It is one of the operator's many transbay routes, which are intended to provide riders a long-distance service across the San Francisco Bay between the East Bay and San Francisco. It specifically serves the Claremont district straddling the city limits of Oakland and Berkeley. The service is descendant of a Key System streetcar and ferry line that operated prior to the formation of AC Transit. The line is noted for its role in the development of the Claremont Hotel.

== Route description ==
From the outbound terminus where Caldecott Lane dead-ends at the Parkwood Community, coaches run on Caldecott Lane, which becomes Tunnel Road. After running one block on Ashby Avenue, buses turn southwest on Claremont Avenue and run until Highway 24. It then begins highway running, cross-bay on the San Francisco–Oakland Bay Bridge before terminating at the Salesforce Transit Center.

== History ==
The Claremont Line was the fourth streetcar line built by the Key System. It was built to exploit real estate development in the area and to support the operation of the forthcoming Claremont Hotel, which was being built by business interests connected to Francis "Borax" Smith and the Key System. The company acquired a franchise in 1904 to operate on 55th Street, and service from the Berkeley main line to Telegraph Avenue began on August 1, 1906 — the line was operated as a shuttle with connections to ferry cars along Adeline Street. Tracks were extended down Claremont Avenue to College in September the following year, with tracks reaching the Claremont Hotel property in December. Tracks terminated between the hotel's tennis courts. Full train-ferry service to the site began on May 10, 1910, and the hotel would go on to open in 1915, giving the service a leisure-oriented destination for its outbound terminus. The line's expansion was successful in spurring development in the area.

Cars began running across the San Francisco–Oakland Bay Bridge to the Transbay Terminal upon the facility's opening in 1939. The Key System adopted letter designations for its transbay routes at this time, with the Berkeley route designated as E. Rail service ended on April 19, 1958 and the line was thereafter operated by buses.

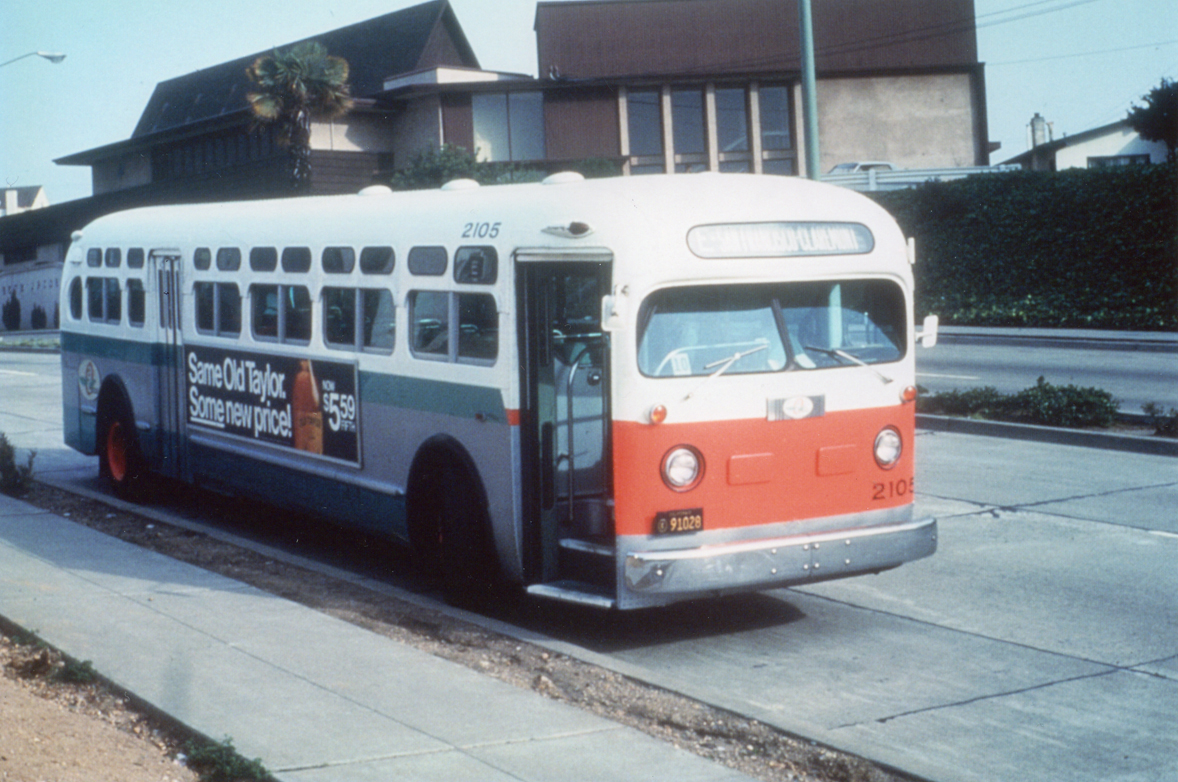
E San Francisco–Claremont served by a GM TDH-4801 Old Look coach, originally built for the Key System in 1958

=== Public ownership ===
AC Transit took over operation of the Key system's assets in October 1960. In February 1961, the E Claremont's routing was changed to operate on 55th, Vicente, Ayala, Miranda, and Claremont. Motor coaches making transbay runs began operating on the Grove-Shafter Freeway in September 1969. Some rush hour trips were extended to the Parkwood Apartment complex starting December 1975.

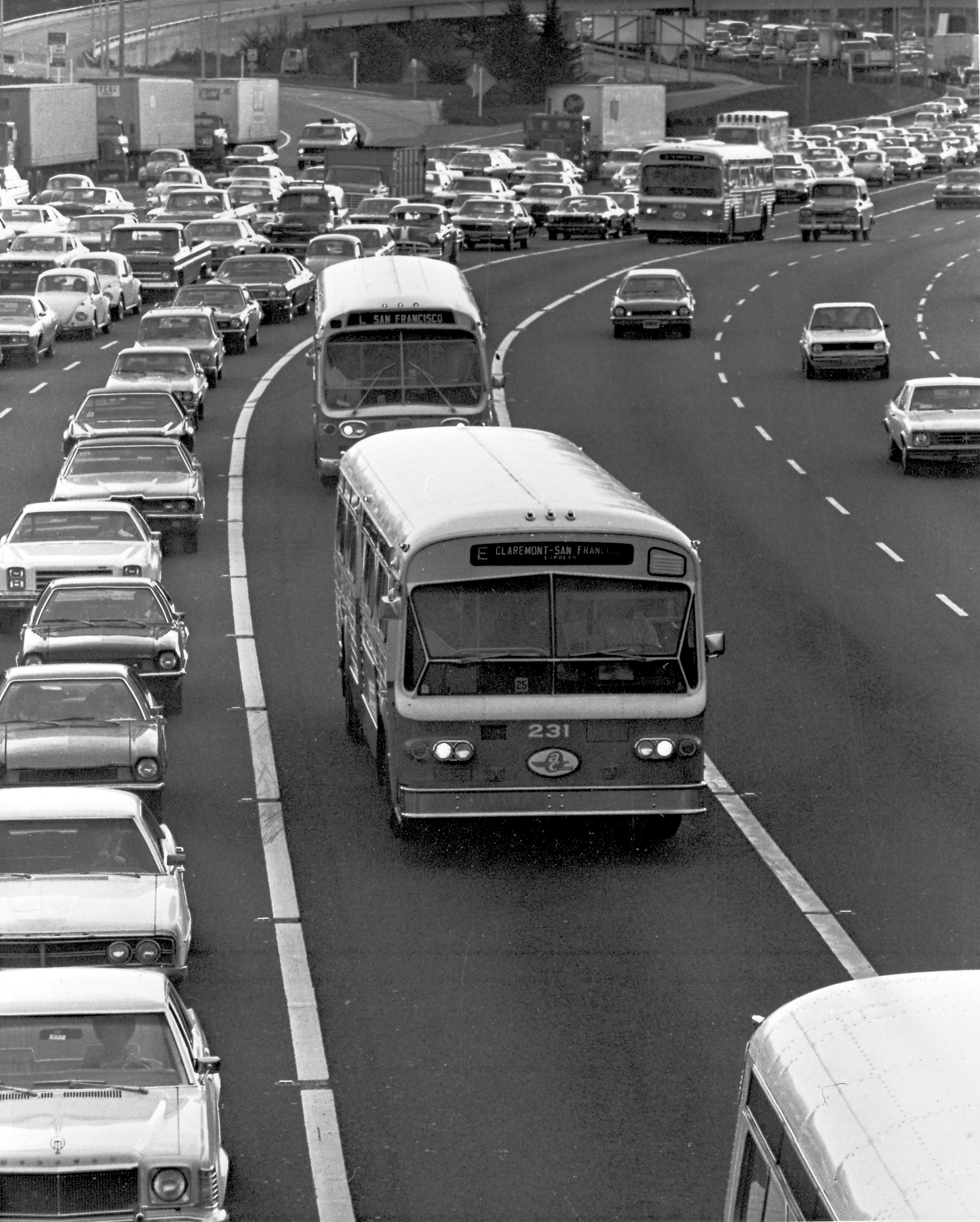
An E Flxible New Look bus followed by an L GM New Look bus approaching the Bay Bridge with a third bus trailing at upper-right frame

Buses ceased serving the Transbay Terminal on August 7, 2010, and the San Francisco terminus was moved to the Temporary Transbay Terminal. The E line began serving the Salesforce Transit Center on August 12, 2018. Service ceased amid the COVID-19 pandemic, with operations suspended between April 2020 and August 2021.
