= Security Bank and Trust Company Building =

Historic place in Oakland, California

- U.S. National Register of Historic Places
- Oakland Designated Landmark
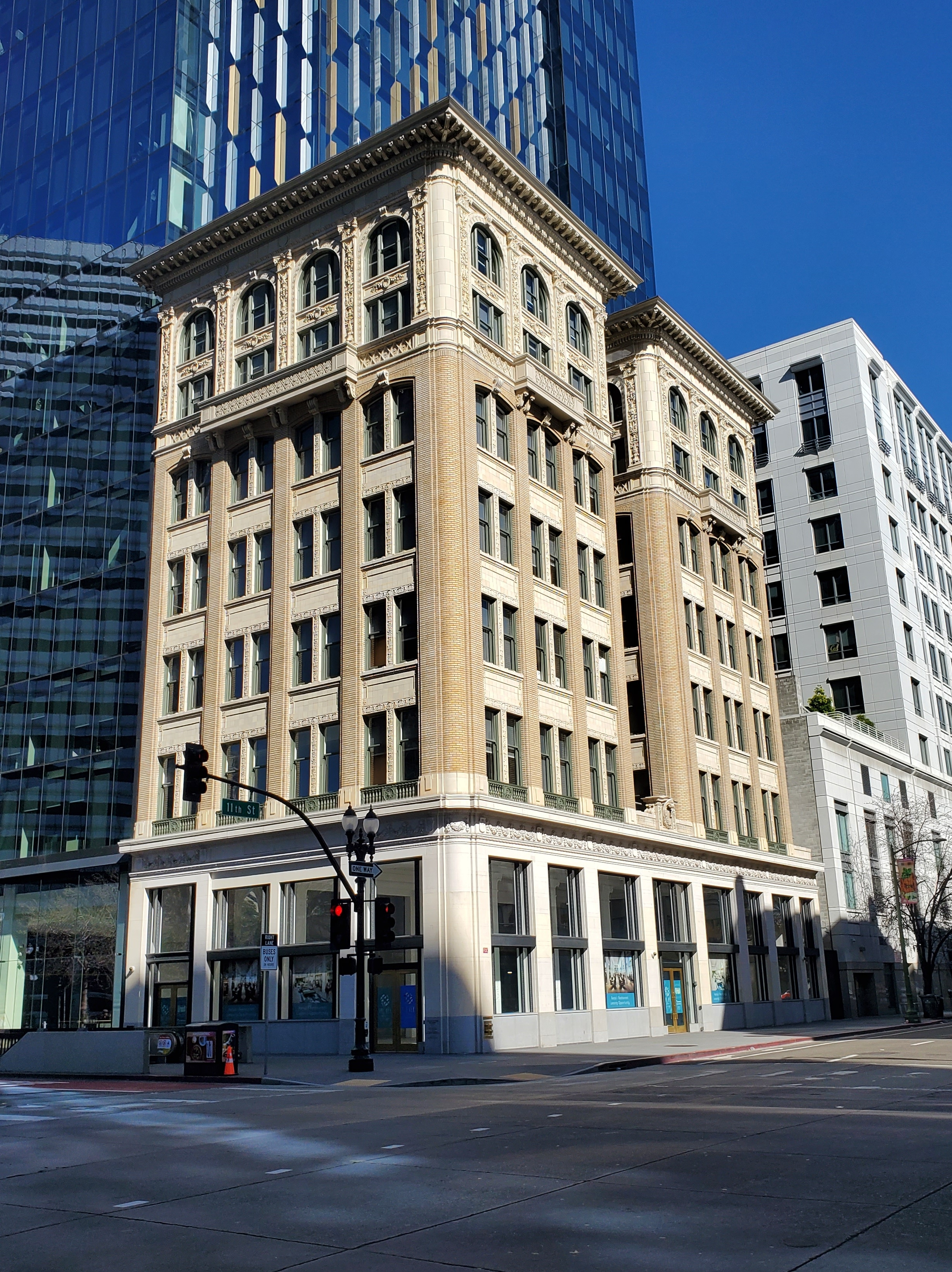
- The building in March 2024
- Interactive map of Security Bank and Trust Company Building
- Location: 1100 Broadway; Oakland, California
- Coordinates: 37.80222°N 122.27194°W
- Built: 1911
- Architects: Frederick Meyer and Walter Reed
- Architectural style: Renaissance Revival and Baroque architecture
- NRHP reference No.: 82002166
- ODL No.: 82

Significant dates
- Added to NRHP: July 26, 1982
- Designated ODL: 1984

The Security Bank and Trust Company Building, also called the Key System Building, is an office building in Oakland, California. It was constructed in 1911 and listed on the National Register of Historic Places on July 26, 1982. The renaissance Revival and baroque architecture building was designed by Frederick Meyer and Walter Reed. The six-story building as a U-shaped floor giving the upper floors more windows. The building is noted for it use of terracotta. The Security Bank and Trust Company Building has also been the headquarters of Key System, Oakland's public transportation system. Frederick Meyer also designed the San Francisco Bankers Investment Building (1912), Kohler and Chase Building (1909), Physicians Building (1914), Humboldt Bank Building (1906) and the Monadnock Building (1906).

== See also ==
- National Register of Historic Places listings in Alameda County, California
