= Adams Point, Oakland, California =

Adams Point
- Neighborhood of Oakland
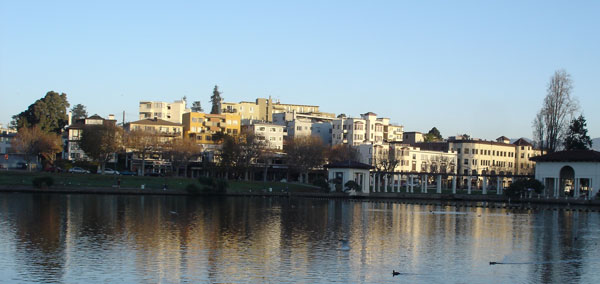
- A view towards the Grand Avenue side of Lake Merritt. The apartments in view are part of the Adams Point neighborhood and are typical of the dense housing found in the area.

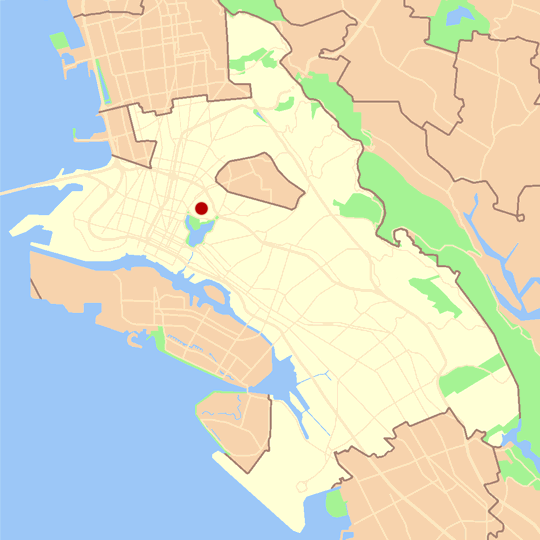
- Location of Adams Point in Oakland
- Coordinates: 37°48′45″N 122°15′19″W
- Country: United States
- State: California
- County: Alameda
- City: Oakland

Area
  - Total: 0.7 sq mi (1.8 km^{2})

Population (2020)
  - Total: 14,831
  - Density: 21,187/sq mi (8,180/km^{2})

Adams Point is a neighborhood of Oakland, California. It is located on the northern shore of Lake Merritt, directly adjacent to Downtown Oakland and the Grand Lake district. It is a triangle bounded by Grand Avenue on the south, Harrison Street on the northwest, and the MacArthur Freeway on the northeast. It lies at an elevation of 79 feet (24 m). Neighborhood landmarks include the Veteran's Memorial Building, the Earl Warren House, the art deco Bellevue-Staten Building, Lakeside Park, one of Oakland's larger parks, and Children's Fairyland, which is in the park.

== History ==
The name Adams Point, and the short Adams Street, comes from the name of one of the early landowners in Oakland, Edson Adams. The area served as a camp for people displaced from San Francisco by the 1906 earthquake. Many of such displaced people remained in Oakland afterward, swelling its population.

== Commercial area ==
Numerous ground floor retail businesses populate the Grand Ave business district, which are within walking distance of the neighborhood.

== City and county politics ==
As of 2023 , it is in District 5 of Alameda County, California.

In 2022, the Oakland city approved a redistricting, which occurs every 10 years; portions of Adam Point are in District 1 and District 3.

== See also ==
- Lakeside Apartments District
- Oakland City Center
- Uptown Oakland
