= Trestle Glen, Oakland, California =

Coordinates: 37°48′45″N 122°14′03″W

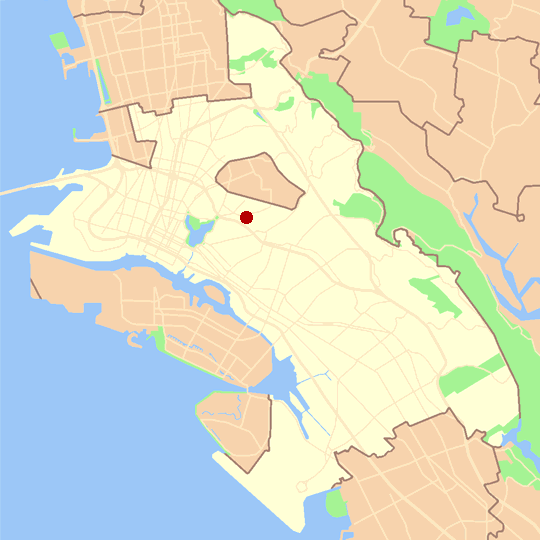
Location of Trestle Glen in the City of Oakland.

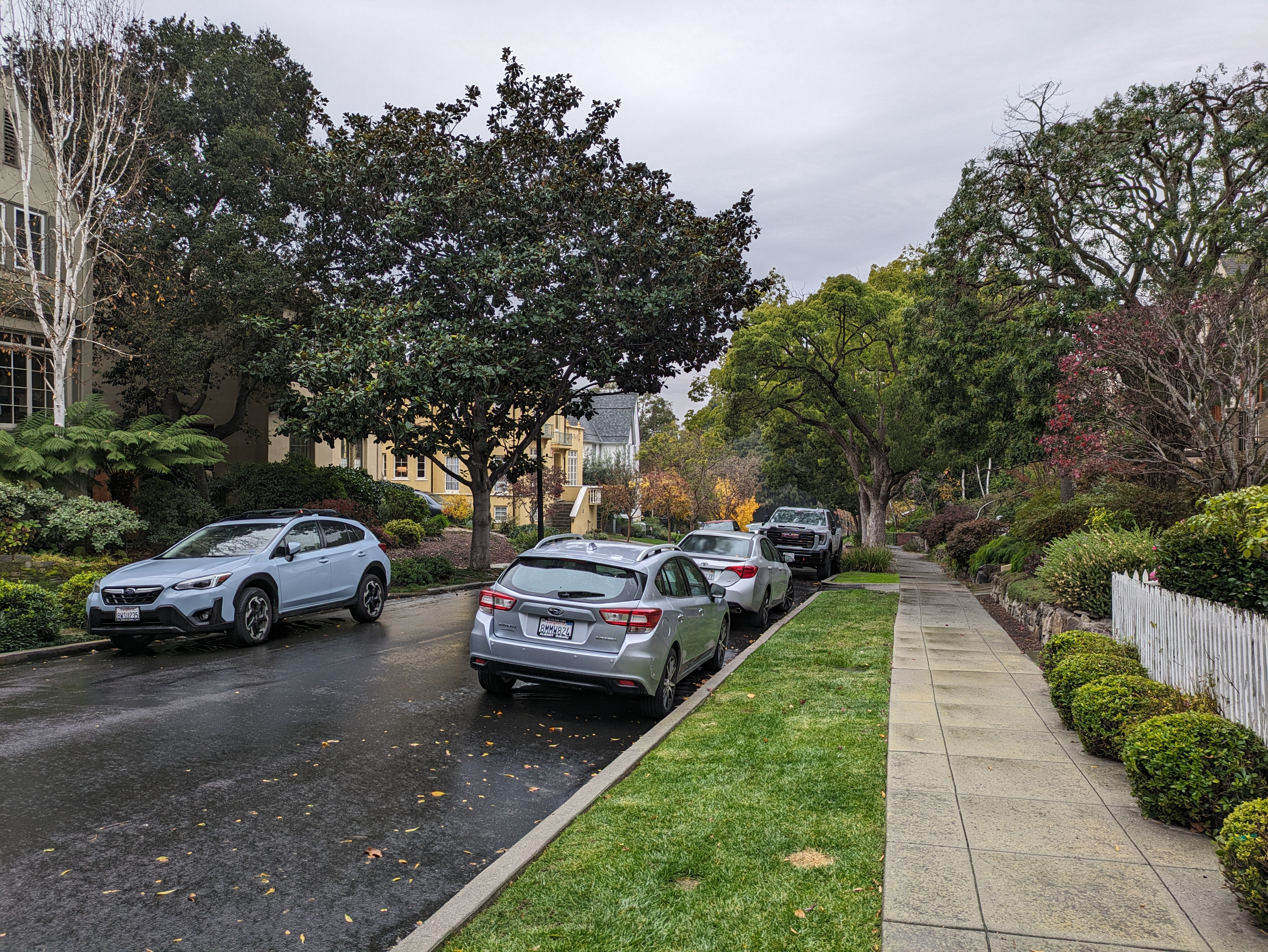
A street in Trestle Glen

Trestle Glen is a neighborhood in Oakland, California. It is located east of Lakeshore Avenue, a shopping street which it shares with the Grand Lake District. It lies at an elevation of 144 feet (44 m). The streets are laid out in the curvilinear pattern of early 20th century garden suburbs. Many of the houses are nestled in the surrounding hills, and were built shortly before The Great Depression.

== History ==
Banker Peder Sather owned the area in the 1880s. After his death in 1886, his wife Jane allowed the land to be used as a park. It was then named after a railroad trestle built in 1893, which was dismantled in 1906 when the line was rerouted. The railroad line ran along Trestle Glen Creek, which was named Indian Gulch by early settlers after the Huchiun village that was located near the present-day intersection of Lakeshore Avenue and Trestle Glen Road (the creek is now mostly underground). Key System streetcars were instrumental in spurring the development of residential neighborhoods in the area. It is often written that Mark Twain was a passenger on the maiden voyage of the streetcar, though Twain lived in Europe at the time.

In 1915, the Olmsted Brothers created an original site plan for the neighborhood. Marketed as "Lakeshore Highlands", the real estate development attracted Julia Morgan and other well known architects to design original homes. Trestle Glen then became part of the Lakeshore Homes Association, which was founded in 1917 and is the second oldest homeowners association west of the Mississippi River.

In the 1950s, the California Department of Highways used eminent domain to seize and demolish about 160 homes in the neighborhood to build the MacArthur Freeway.
