= Oakland Army Base =

Decommissioned US Army base in California

- Oakland, California in United States of America

Site information
- Type: Army Base
- Operator: United States Army
- Open to the public: No

Location
- Coordinates: 37°49′00″N 122°18′02″W

Site history
- Built: 1941
- In use: 1941–1999
- Fate: decommissioned

The Oakland Army Base, also known as the Oakland Army Terminal, is a decommissioned United States Army base in the San Francisco Bay Area of California. The base was located at the Port of Oakland on Maritime Street just south of the eastern entrance to the San Francisco–Oakland Bay Bridge.

Construction of the base commenced in 1941 as a part of the expanding San Francisco Port of Embarkation which was headquartered at Fort Mason on the San Francisco waterfront. Initially named the Oakland Sub-Port of the San Francisco Port of Embarkation, the base was renamed the Oakland Army Base in 1944. The installation moved in excess of 8.5 million tons of cargo during World War II, and 7.2 million tons of cargo passed through the terminal during the Korean War.

In 1946, the Oakland Army Base expanded to incorporate the administrative and cantonment area of the Port formerly known as Camp John T. Knight in honor of World War I Brigadier General John Thornton Knight.

In 1955 the San Francisco Port of Embarkation became the U.S. Army Transportation Terminal Command Pacific, and the Oakland Army Base became the Oakland Army Terminal. In 1964 the headquarters of the command moved from Fort Mason to the Oakland Army Terminal, and in 1966 the terminal was renamed back to the Oakland Army Base. During the Vietnam War, Oakland Army Base served as a major transit station for U.S. soldiers en route to and returning from all deployment locations in East Asia—such as Vietnam and Korea. The base decommissioned on September 30, 1999.

In 2007, the Oral History Center of The Bancroft Library at the University of California, Berkeley, in partnership with the City of Oakland and the Port of Oakland, commenced a comprehensive oral history project documenting the history of the Base from its opening in 1941 to its closure in 1999, and thereafter.

== Redevelopment ==
The city of Oakland has proposed a US$1billion redevelopment plan for the base. The California Transportation Commission has set aside US$240million in funding for the proposal, which would transform the site into a warehousing and logistics center for the Port of Oakland.

In 2008, the City of Oakland issued a Request for Qualifications (RFQ) to find a developer to undertake the redevelopment of the site. Thirteen developers submitted proposals and four were selected as finalists. Largely due to the downturn of the US economy, two of the four development interests dropped out of the process, leaving Federal Realty and AMB/CCG JV competing. In 2010 the Oakland City council selected AMB/CCG to enter into an exclusive negotiating agreement. In June 2012 the council accepted the terms of a Lease Disposition and Development Agreement with California Capital and Investment Group (CCIG) and Prologis. (CCG principals had incorporated, and AMB property corporation had merged with Prologis.) Under this arrangement CCIG will perform all of the master planning, public infrastructure work, rail and wharf improvements while Prologis will provide warehouse and logistics facilities. The first phase of the project, slated to break ground in mid-2013, is estimated to cost a total of $484 million, of which $247 million is for public infrastructure.

On October 21, 2020, the Judge John Sutter Regional Shoreline park opened to the public on the former site of the base, at the foot of the Bay Bridge.
