= Grand Lake, Oakland, California =

Grand Lake
- Neighborhood of Oakland
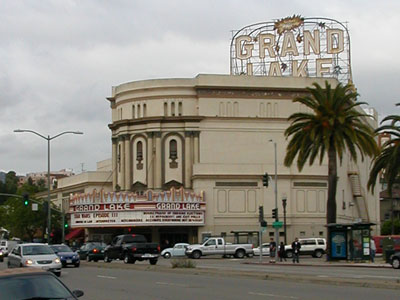
- The Grand Lake Theater

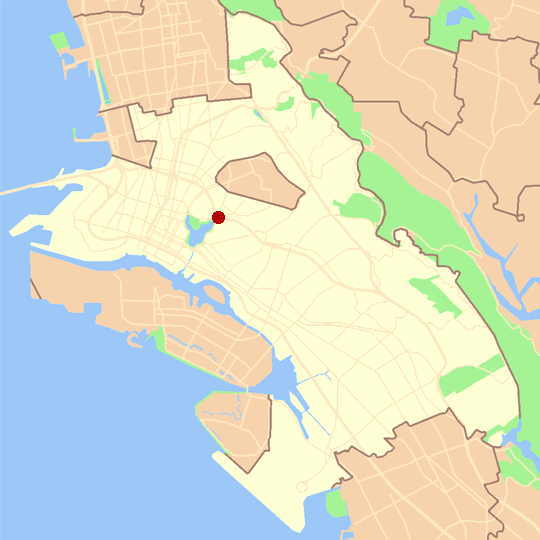
- Location of Grand Lake in Oakland
- Coordinates: 37.811667°N 122.245833°W
- Country: United States
- State: California
- County: Alameda
- City: Oakland

Grand Lake, or the Grand Lake District, is a neighborhood in Oakland, California, United States. The neighborhood is located in the northeast corner of Lake Merritt, where Grand Avenue and Lakeshore Avenue pass under Interstate 580. It borders Adams Point to the west, Trestle Glen/Crocker Highlands to the east, and the city of Piedmont to the north. It lies at an elevation of 52 feet (16 m).

There are two shopping areas in the Grand Lake District:

- Grand Avenue, between Piedmont and Adams Point, the larger of the two. The Grand Lake Theater dominates the corner of Grand and Lake Park Ave.
- Lakeshore Avenue, between Lake Park Ave and Mandana Blvd.

The two streets are connected at their closest point by Lake Park Avenue and Splashpad Park, home of the neighborhood's large Saturday farmers' market.

In 1928, Joseph Edy and William Dreyer first sold their Grand Ice Cream at 3315 Grand Avenue.

The Grand Lake neighborhood has seen a significant degree of revitalization since the 1990s. The property values of the area have increased as a result, contributing to the overall rise in land value of the San Francisco Bay Area.
