= Golden West Books =

American publishing company

- Company type: Private
- Industry: Publishing
- Genre: American Railroads
- Founded: San Marino, California, U.S. (1960)
- Founder: Donald Duke
- Headquarters: San Marino, California, U.S.
- Key people: Ralph Melching - Manager
- Products: Books
- Revenue: $4.40 M Sales, Estimate
- Number of employees: 3
- Website: www.goldenwestbooks.com

Golden West Books is a privately owned American publishing company specializing in American Railroads. Donald Duke founded the company in 1960, and wrote some of its titles. Its headquarters are in San Marino, California. The company's titles cover steam locomotives, diesel locomotives, logging railroads, mining railways, funiculars, the caboose, electric interurbans, Inter-city rail and histories of the Santa Fe Railroad. Model railroad-oriented hobby retail shops sell some of Golden West's books.
