= Longfellow (disambiguation) =

Henry Wadsworth Longfellow (1807–1882) was an American poet.

Longfellow may also refer to:

== People ==
- Longfellow (surname)
- Andy Kim (singer) (born 1952), Canadian singer-songwriter of Lebanese origin, a.k.a. Baron Longfellow or just Longfellow
- Lester Piggott (1935–2022), British jockey who was given the nickname "The Long Fellow" due to his large stature compared to other jockeys

== Places ==
- Longfellow, Pennsylvania
- Longfellow, Minneapolis, United States
  - Longfellow (neighborhood), Minneapolis, United States
- Longfellow, Oakland, California, United States

== Others ==
- Longfellow (horse) (1867–1893), an American racehorse
- Longfellow Deeds, a character in the 1936 film Mr. Deeds Goes to Town and the 2002 remake Mr. Deeds
- "Longfellow", a song by Days Of The New from their album Days of the New

== See also ==
- Longfellow Elementary School (disambiguation)
- Longfellow Middle School (disambiguation)
- Longfellow National Historic Site
- Éamon de Valera (1882–1975), Irish statesman nicknamed "The Long Fellow"
