= Bushrod, Oakland, California =

Neighborhood of Oakland, California, US

Bushrod
- Neighborhood of Oakland
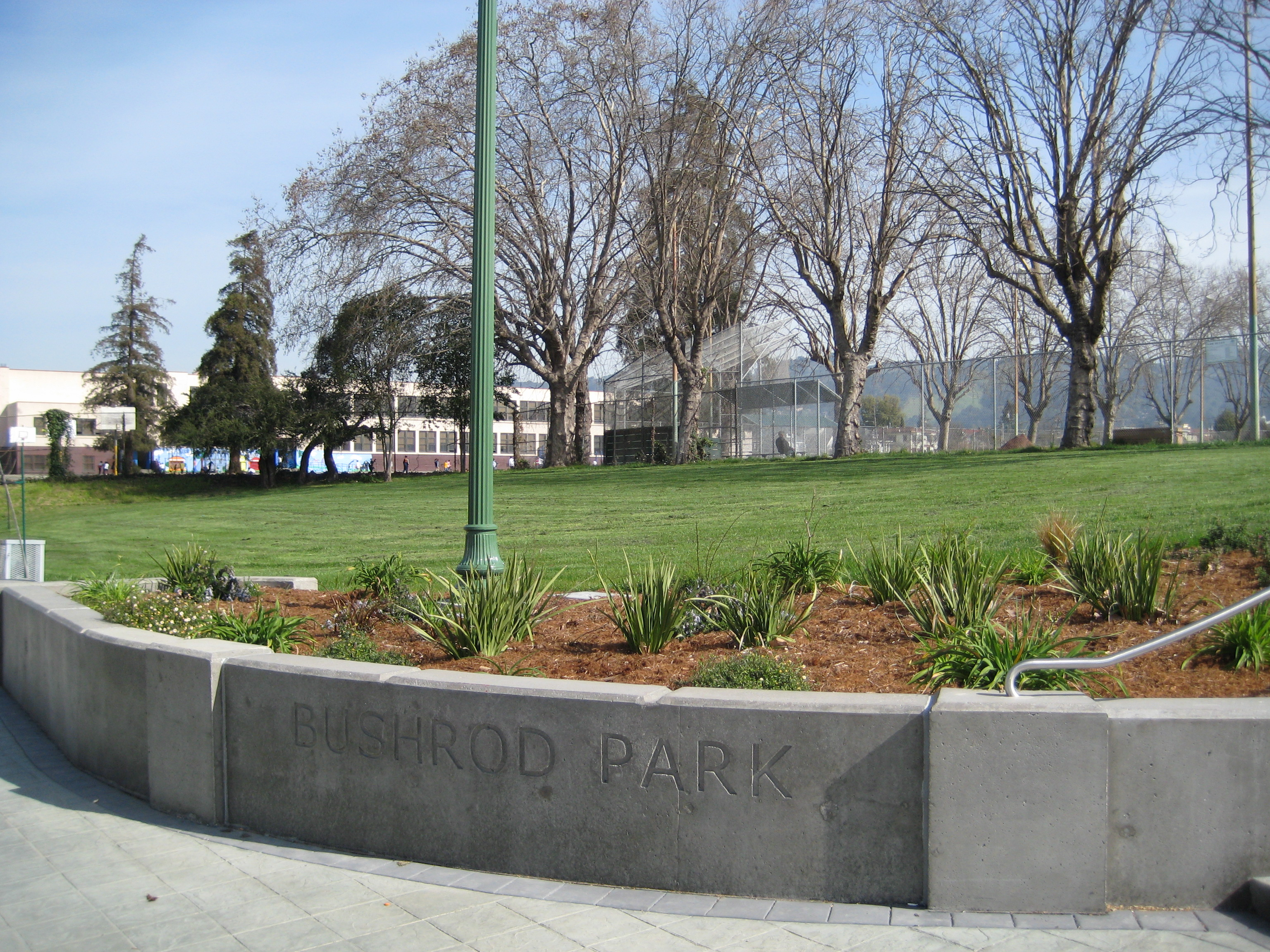
- Shattuck Avenue entrance to Bushrod Park

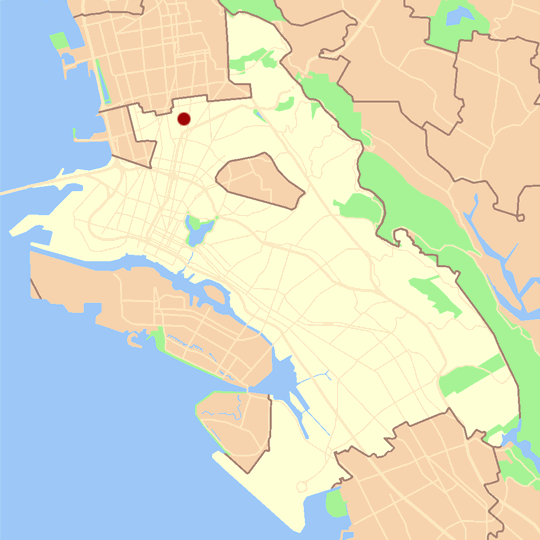
- Location of Bushrod Park in Oakland
- Coordinates: 37.84576°N 122.26358°W
- Country: United States
- State: California
- County: Alameda
- City: Oakland

The Bushrod neighborhood in North Oakland, Oakland, California, is an area surrounding its namesake park, and bounded by Martin Luther King, Jr. Way to the west, Claremont Avenue to the east, Highway 24 to the south, and the Berkeley border to the north. It borders the neighborhoods of Santa Fe to the west, Fairview Park to the east, and Temescal and Shafter to the south and southeast, respectively. It was named after Bushrod Washington James, a noted homeopath, who left property in his will for the development of Bushrod park. Notable landmarks include the Bushrod Park ballfields and the former Bushrod Washington Elementary School, which share adjoining land on a large greenbelt and open space in the heart of the neighborhood.

In 2017, the real estate firm Redfin named Bushrod the hottest neighborhood market in the United States based on traffic to its website by potential home buyers.

== Demographics ==
The Bushrod neighborhood is 32.95% African-American, 52% White, 9.7% Hispanic, and 3.62% Asian

== Parks ==
=== Bushrod Park ===
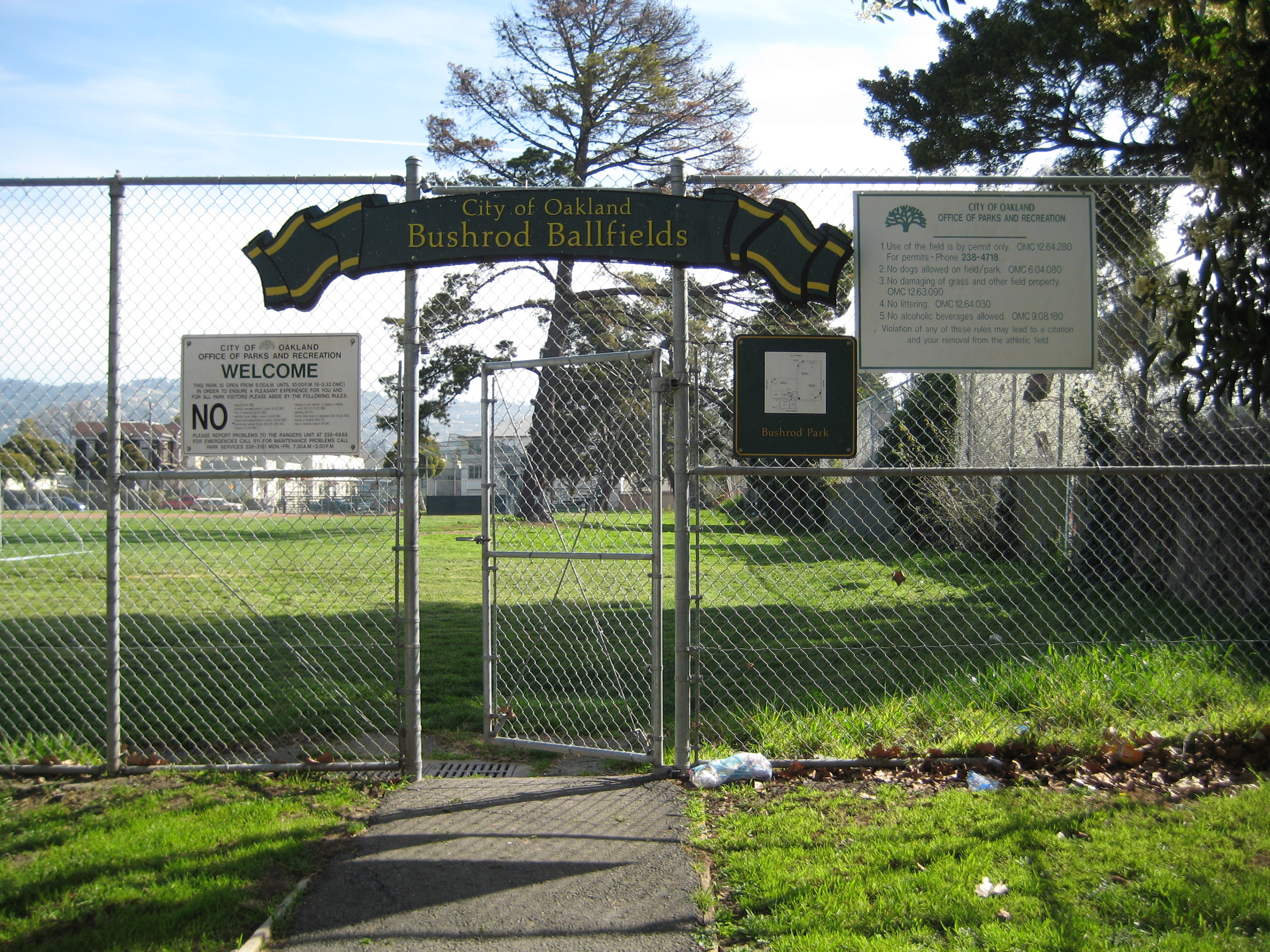
Bushrod Ballfields

At 10.12 acres (41,000 m^{2}), Bushrod is one of the largest parks in the North Oakland section of Oakland, California. It is located between Shattuck Avenue and Racine Street to the east and west, and between 61st Street and 59th Street to the north and south.

The park was established in 1903 through the donation of seven and a half acres of land by Dr. Bushrod Washington James, a resident of Philadelphia, Pennsylvania. In the 1910s it was used as a school playground. It has had a long association with local baseball; baseball players Rickey Henderson, Frank Robinson, Billy Martin, and Vada Pinson played at Bushrod in their youth. In the 1960s, the park was used as a practice field by the Oakland Raiders. The tennis courts are named for Don Budge who played here as a youth.

On April 8, 2006, a block of ice fell from the sky and landed in the park, leaving a crater that was several feet wide.

=== Dover St Edible Park ===
Dover St Park is located at 5707 Dover St between 57th and 58th St. This park is home to a community garden that produces fruits, vegetables, flowers, and herbs. It includes a greenhouse, pollinator garden and over 100 fruit trees.

=== Colby Park ===
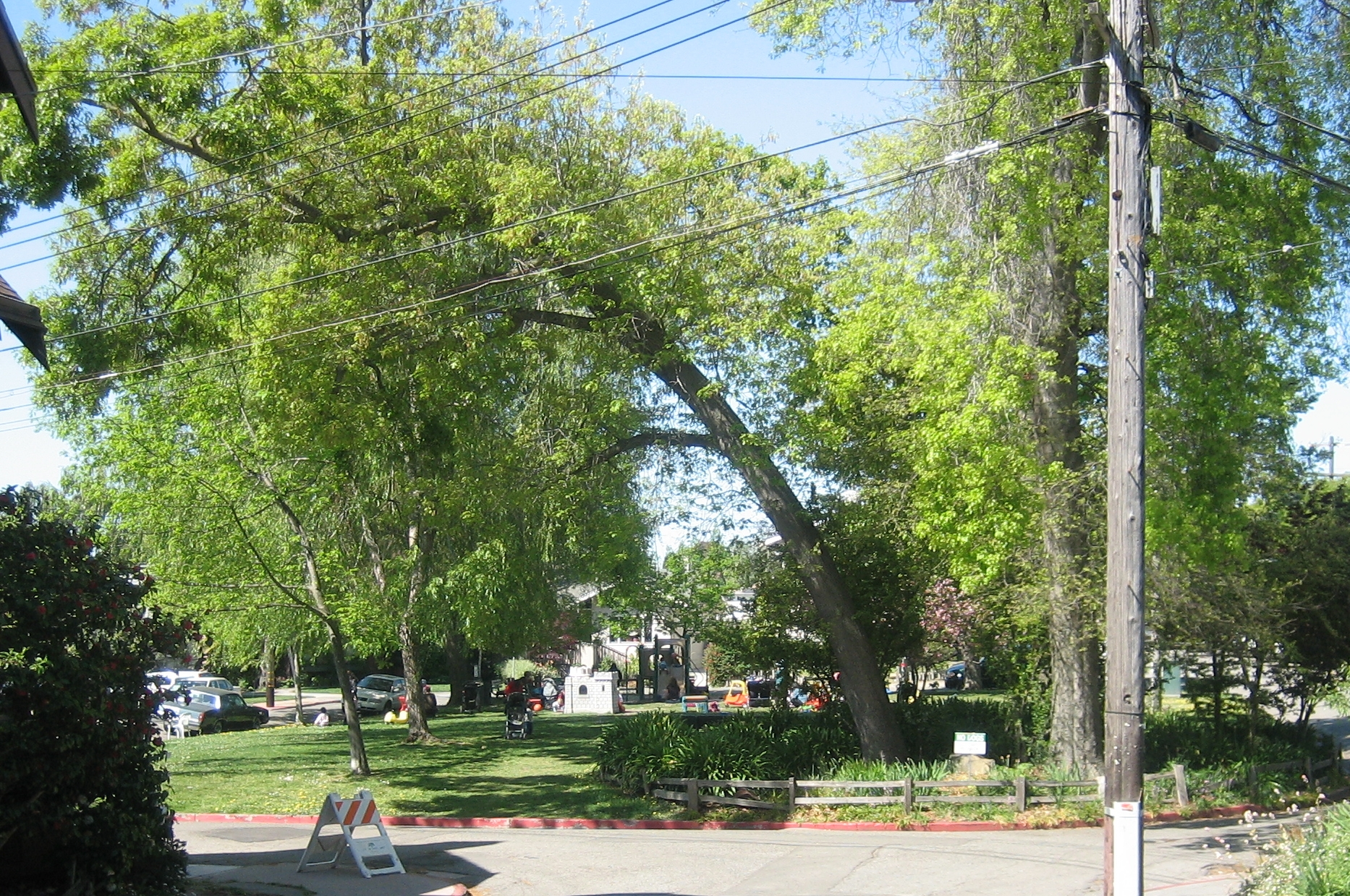
Colby Park as seen from Colby Street

At only 0.35 acres (1,400 m^{2}), Colby Park is one of the smallest parks in North Oakland. It is situated at 61st & Colby Street, and features a sand pit and playground equipment.

== Schools ==
=== Sankofa Academy ===
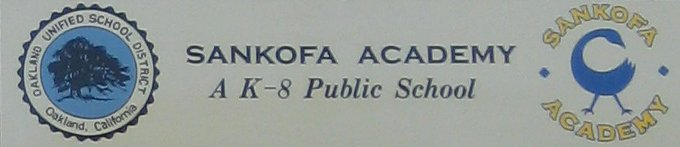
Sankofa Academy logo

The Sankofa Academy is a public school that occupies the building previously used by the Bushrod Washington Elementary School, adjacent to Bushrod Park at 61st Street and Shattuck Avenue. The school was founded in 2005 and is a member of the Oakland Small Schools Foundation.

=== Peralta Elementary School ===
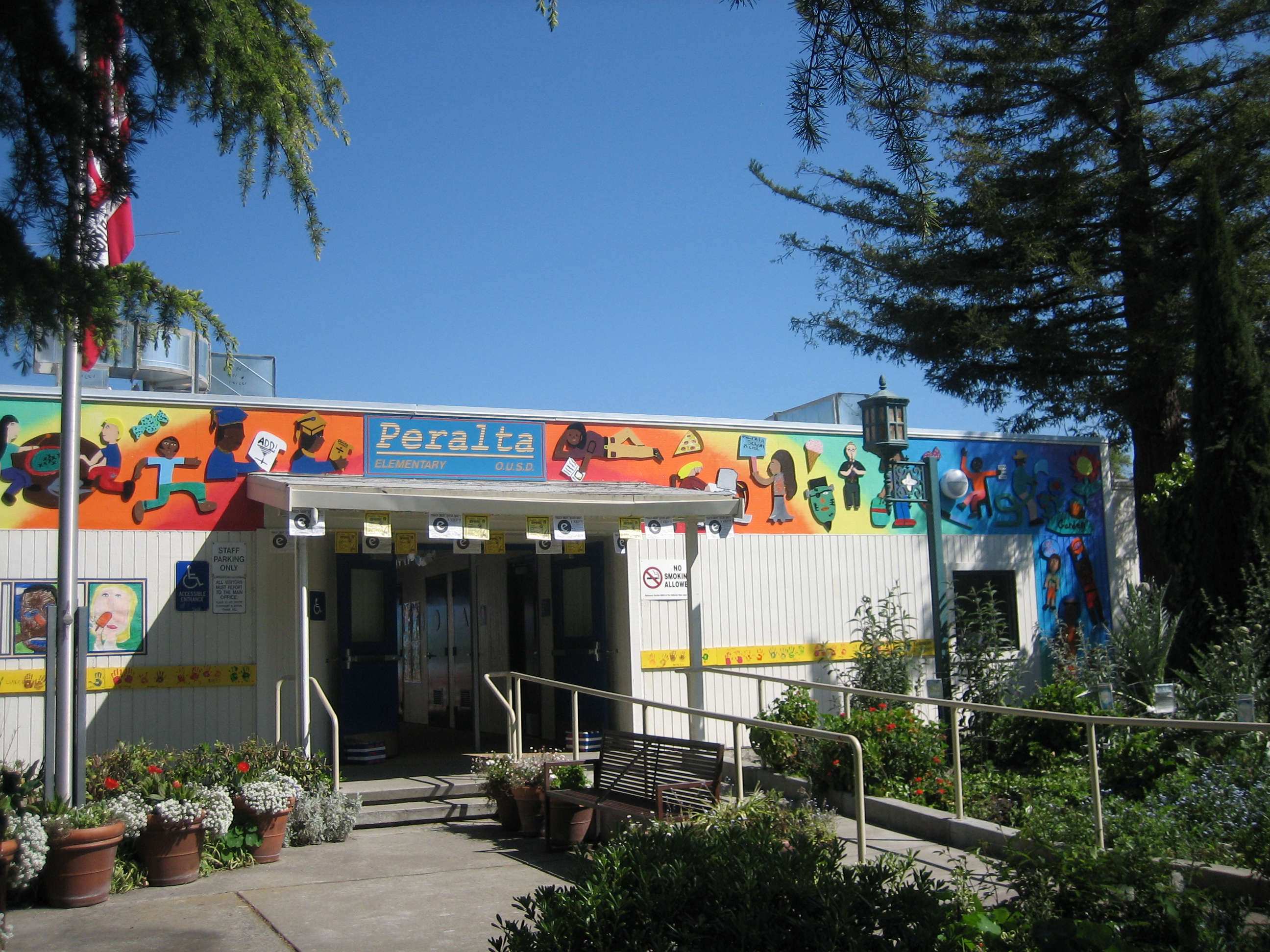
Peralta Elementary School

Peralta Elementary School is a designated arts anchor school in the Oakland Unified School District. It was established in 1880 as a one-room schoolhouse, and today has over 250 students. It is also one of the top ranked Elementary schools in the Oakland and Berkeley neighborhoods.

=== American International Montessori School ===
American International Montessori School is a dual-immersion Montessori school on the border of Oakland and Berkeley. It has programs for students from 18 months to sixth grade. It was founded in 2009 by Ernest Mahr who previously directed two other immersion Montessori schools in the nearby area.

== Images ==
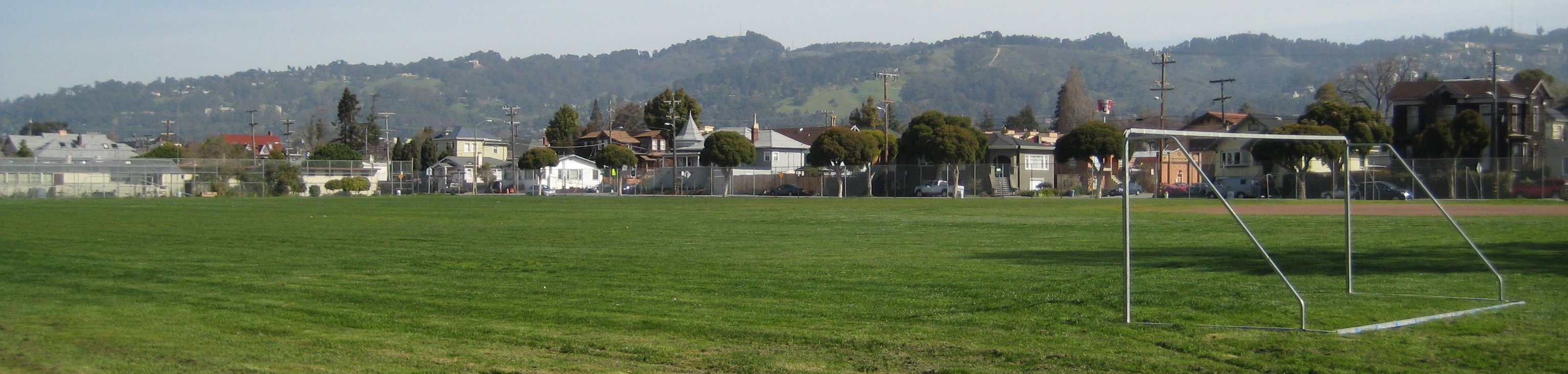
Panoramic view of the neighborhood surrounding Bushrod Park
