= Longfellow, Oakland, California =

Coordinates: 37°49′48.69″N 122°16′20.57″W

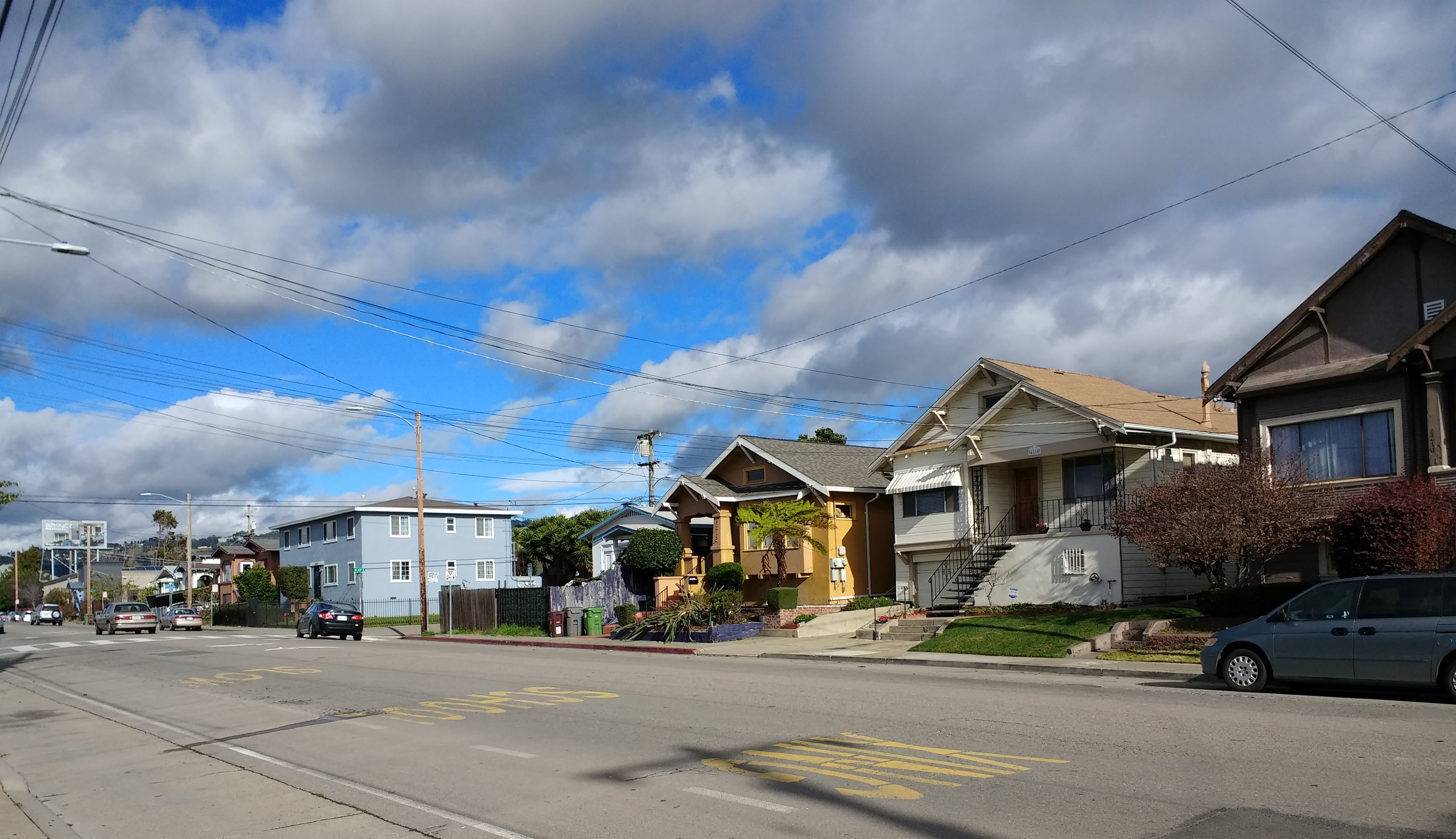
Houses in Longfellow

Longfellow is a neighborhood of North Oakland, California. It is bounded by Temescal Creek to the north, State Route 24 to the east, Interstate 580 to the south, and Adeline Street to the west.

== Geography and education ==
The area that is today known as the Longfellow was originally considered part of the Temescal district. Through the late 1800s, the Temescal encompassed the area north of 36th Street to the Berkeley border and from the Emeryville border at the west to Broadway at the east. The introduction of the Grove-Shafter Freeway in the 1960s physically divided the neighborhood resulting in a splintering of the historical Temescal district into smaller neighborhoods: Santa Fe (northwest quadrant), Longfellow (southwest), Temescal (southeast) and lower Rockridge (northeast).

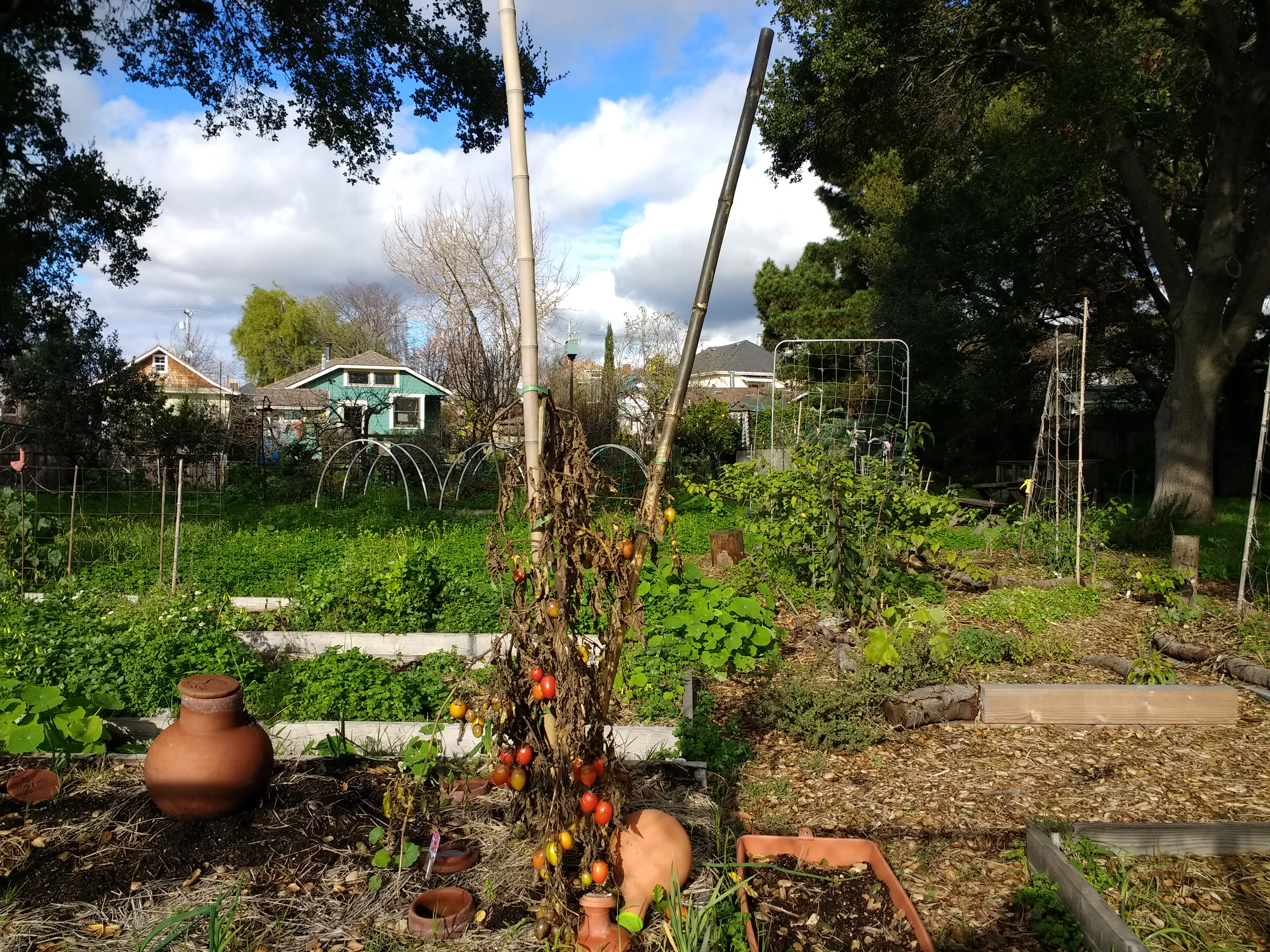
Temescal Community Garden

Evidence of the roots of the name Temescal remain in the Longfellow neighborhood. Temescal Community Garden, the first community garden in Oakland, was established on 47th Street in 1984 and falls within Longfellow’s borders. Temescal Creek, now culverted, runs beneath the rear property line of the garden and ostensibly acts as the physical geography that defines the northern edge of the Longfellow neighborhood.

The name Longfellow was introduced to the neighborhood with the opening of the Longfellow Elementary School on Lusk Street between 39th and Apgar streets. It is assumed that the school is named after the American poet Henry Wadsworth Longfellow. In 1982, Nancy Reagan visited the school as part of a national tour to warn children about the dangers of illegal drug use. When one fourth-grader at the school asked Mrs. Reagan what she should do if approached by someone offering drugs, Reagan responded: "Just say no" and thus the moniker for the national campaign was born. The Longfellow Elementary School closed in 2004, and the property is now used by the Oakland Military Institute, a college preparatory school that relocated to the site in 2007.

Other schools in the neighborhood include North Oakland Community Charter School (NOCCS) and St Martin De Porres Catholic School. The Oakland Public School that served the Longfellow neighborhood, Santa Fe Elementary, closed in 2012, and neighborhood elementary students are now assigned to Emerson Elementary School in the Temescal neighborhood. Santa Fe Elementary had also served the Santa Fe neighborhood to the north, and elementary students in Santa Fe are now assigned to Sankofa Academy in the Bushrod neighborhood.

== Cultural history ==
Through the early 1900s, North Oakland was a vibrant Italian neighborhood including what is now known as the Longfellow district. Grove Street, renamed Martin Lurther King Jr. Way in 1984, was an active commercial strip including many Italian businesses. Sacred Heart Parish on the corner of MLK and 40th Street was founded in 1876 and a cornerstone of the larger Italian neighborhood.

The Grove Street corridor was also home to the Grove Street #5, a streetcar connecting the community to the greater Key System (Key Route). (The Key System’s F line connected Berkeley to the Bay Bridge and ran down Linden Street in the Longfellow neighborhood.)

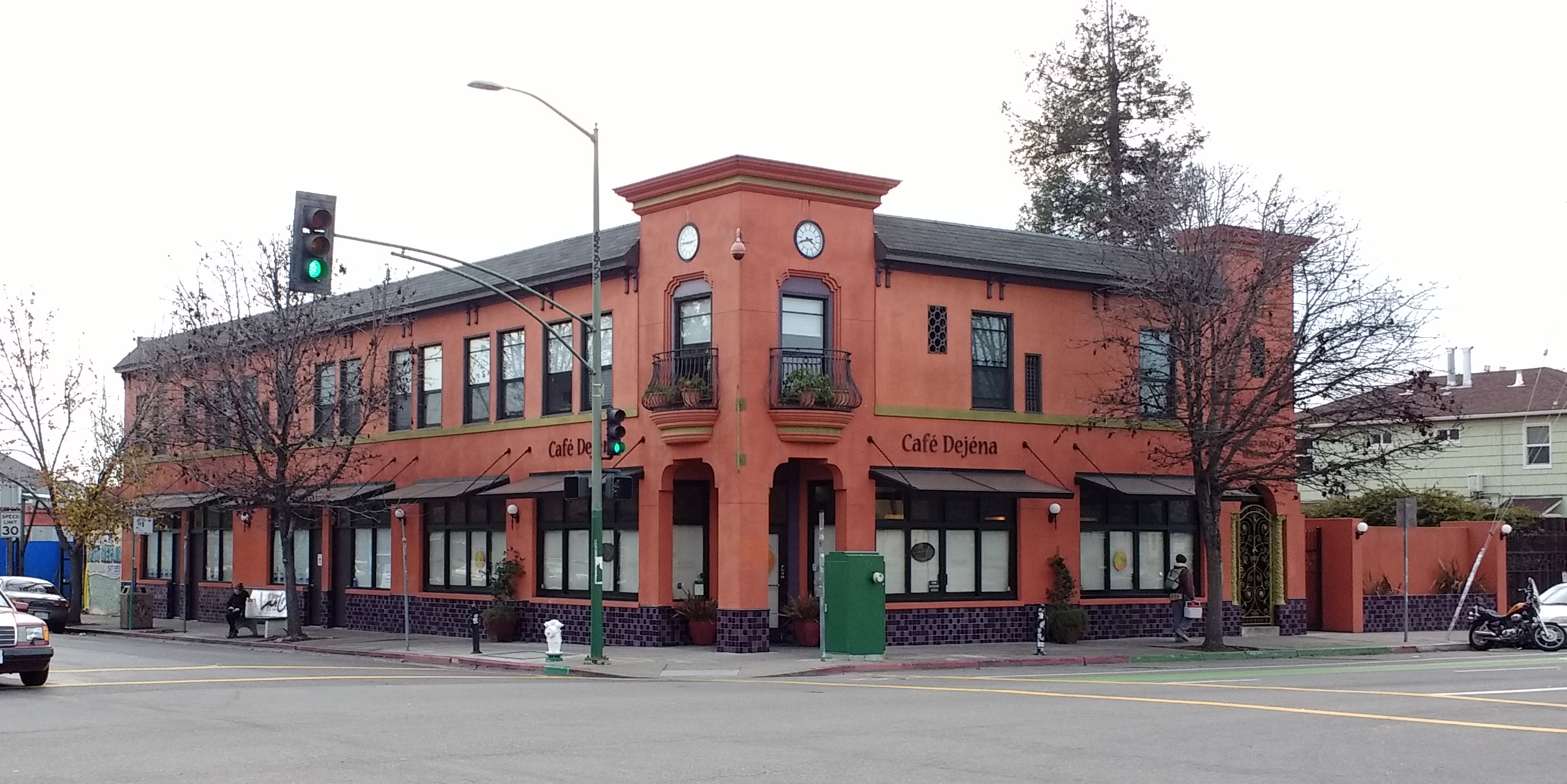
Café Dejéna

The introduction of the freeway in the 1960s divided the neighborhood and both the commercial district along Grove Street and the Sacred Heart Parish suffered as the area fell into decline. Today, this commercial corridor has been revitalized with the introduction of several thriving food related businesses.

In the 1940s and 1950s, the Longfellow and Santa Fe neighborhoods of North Oakland began to transition from a white immigrant population of predominantly Italians to an African American population. Two significant African American organizations, the African American Museum and Library (AAMLO) and the Black Panther Party, began in part in the Longfellow neighborhood.

The AAMLO's predecessor, the East Bay Negro Historical Society, was founded in 1965 by residents of the Longfellow and greater North Oakland. The society first held meetings at the Church of the Good Shepard, which still stands at 52nd and West streets. The society’s library-museum contained documentation of "the history and accomplishments of black Americans – politicians, educators, religious figures, inventors, cowboys and miners who came to California during the Gold Rush" and was open to anyone, including school groups, that were interested in the contributions of African Americans to the American experience. The society moved to a storefront on Grove Street (MLK) at 37th Street in 1970, and later in 1976 to another storefront on Grove Street (MLK) just above 45th Street. The organization moved out of the neighborhood in the 1980s and currently resides on 14th Street.

The Black Panther Party, an African American leftist organization, also finds its roots in the streets of North Oakland including the Longfellow neighborhood. Founders Huey P. Newton and David Hilliard grew up on 47th Street and West Street respectively, and the Second Black Panther Party Office was located on the 4400 block of Martin Luther King Jr. Way.

== Present day ==
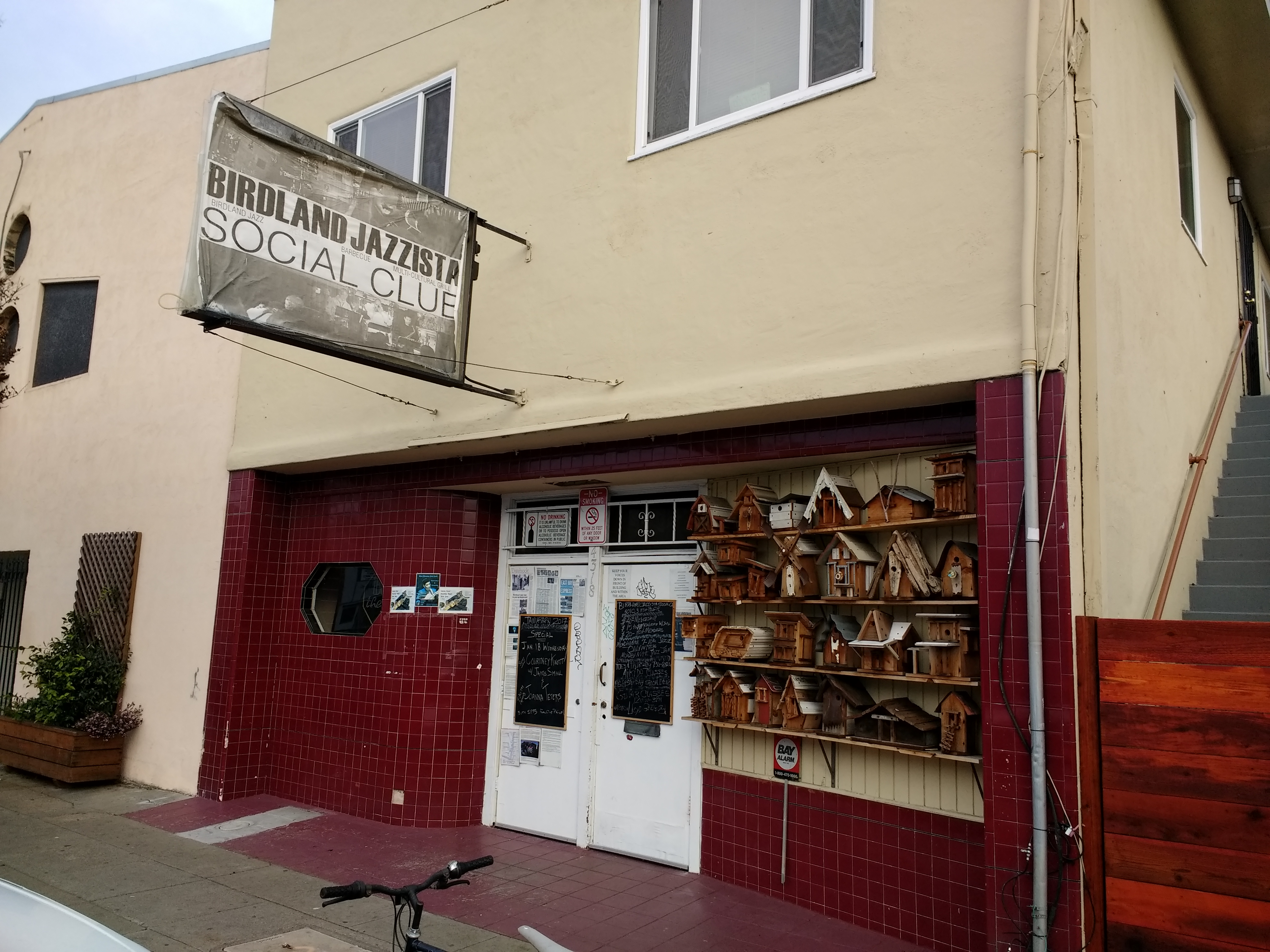
Birdland Jazzista Social Club

The neighborhood has an active community group, which formed in 2010, known as the Longfellow Community Association. The LCA currently has more than 100 members and five strong committees working on various community interests and led by coordinators/co-coordinators. The group has also formed alliances with the NCPC, local schools and businesses, Urban Releaf, the councilperson’s office and more. Many artists live in the neighborhood, among them, famous metalsmith and Burning Man art car creator Jon Sarriugarte. Many new restaurants have started in the most recent economic boom post 2008

== Sources ==
- Malaspina, Rick. Italian Oakland. Charleston: Arcadia Publishing, 2011. ISBN 978-0-7385-8170-5
- Norman, Jeff. Temescal Legacies: Narratives of Change from a North Oakland Neighborhood. Oakland: Sacred Ground, 2006. ISBN 0-9778893-0-0
