= North Oakland, Oakland, California =

Neighbourhood region in Oakland, California

Coordinates: 37°49′55.28″N 122°15′59.41″W

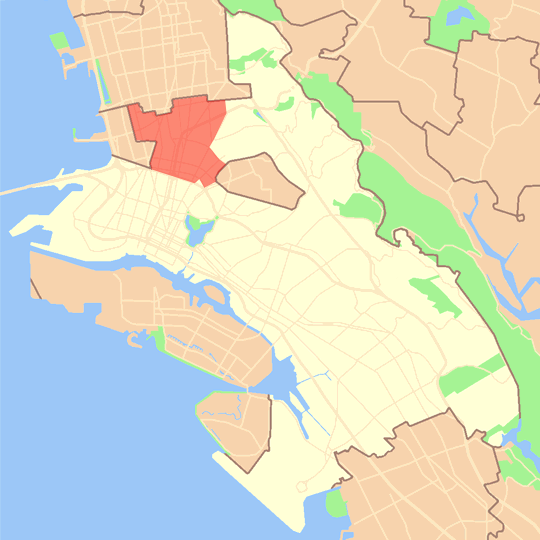
Location of North Oakland in the City of Oakland.

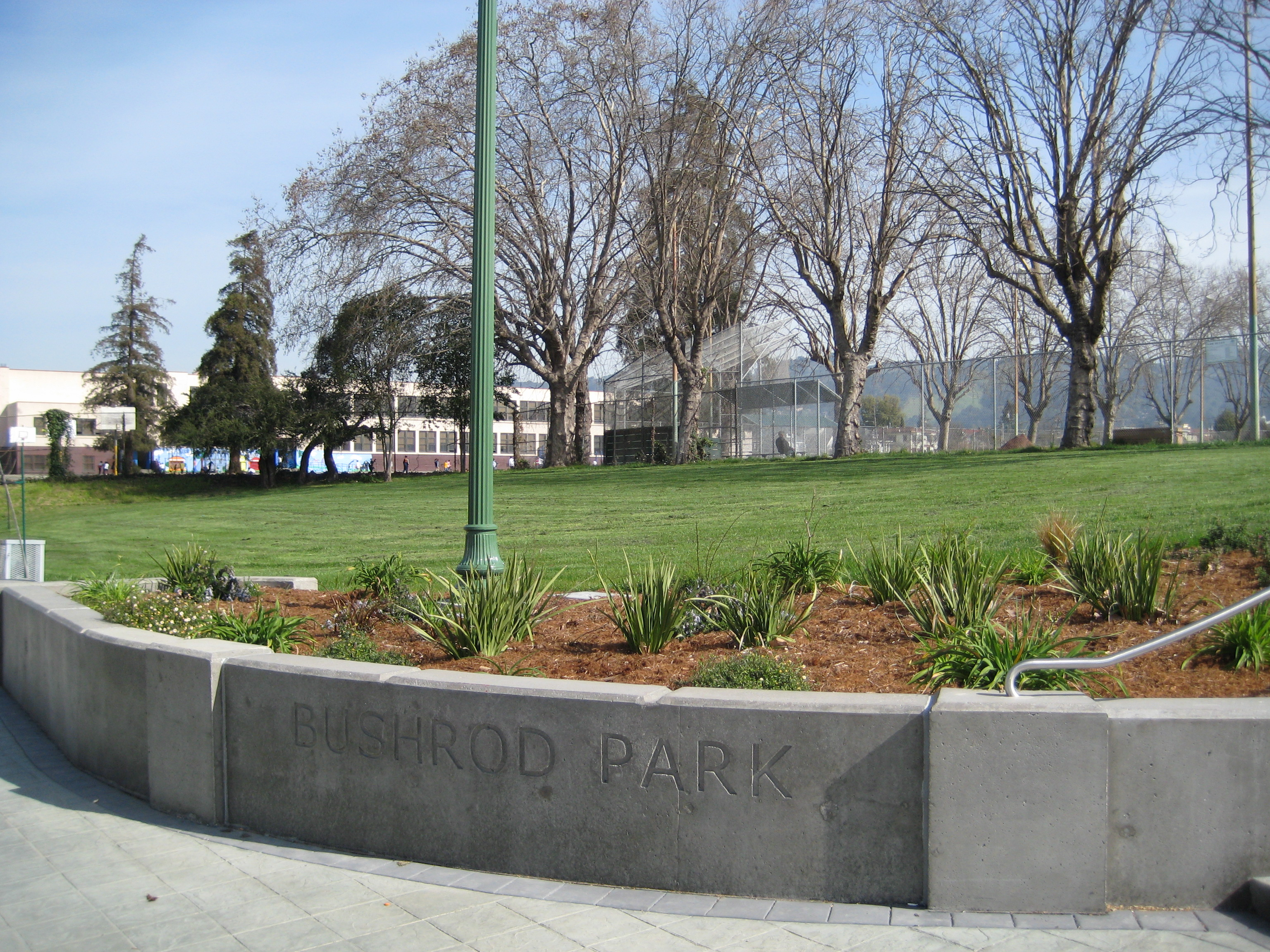
Bushrod Park in North Oakland

North Oakland is an area in Oakland, California, United States, bordered by Downtown Oakland, Oakland Hills, and the adjacent cities of Berkeley, Emeryville and Piedmont. Annexed to Oakland in 1897, it is known as the birthplace of the Black Panther Party and is the childhood home of both its co-founders, Dr. Huey P. Newton and Bobby Seale.

== Neighborhoods ==
According to a project commissioned by the city in 1982 to define Oakland's neighborhoods for landscaping purposes, North Oakland comprises the following neighborhoods:

- Bushrod Park
- Golden Gate
- Koreatown
- Longfellow
- Piedmont Avenue
- Rockridge
- Santa Fe
- Temescal
- Fairview Park
- Shafter
- Gaskill
- Paradise Park

== Media ==
Oakland North has covered the area since 2008 and Oakland Local since 2009.
