= Bushrode =

Bushrode is a surname. Notable people with the surname include:

- John Bushrode (1612–1684), English merchant and politician
- Richard Bushrode (1576–1628), English haberdasher and merchant adventurer

== See also ==
- Bushrod (disambiguation)
