= Bushrod =

Bushrod may refer to:

== Given name ==
- Bushrod Washington James, (1836–1903), American surgeon, homeopath, educator, writer, and philanthropist
- Bushrod Johnson (1817–1880), teacher, university chancellor, and Confederate general in the American Civil War
- Bushrod Washington (1762–1829), U.S. Supreme Court associate justice and the nephew of George Washington
- Bushrod C. Washington (1790–1851), Virginia planter and politician, orphaned nephew raised (with his brother John Augustine Washington II) by Judge Bushrod Washington
- Bushrod Washington Wilson (1824–1900), American pioneer and politician

== Surname ==
- Jermon Bushrod (born 1984), American football guard for the Miami Dolphins in the National Football League
- Thomas Bushrod, Virginia planter and politician, progenitor of the Bushrod family which ended with Judge Bushrod Washington's mother, Hannah Bushrod

== Places ==
- Bushrod Island, island near Monrovia, Liberia
- Bushrod Park, Oakland, California neighborhood in North Oakland, Oakland, California, United States

== See also ==
- Thomasine & Bushrod, 1974 blaxploitation film directed by Gordon Parks, Jr., written by and starring Max Julien
