= Piedmont Theatre =

Movie Theater, in Oakland, California

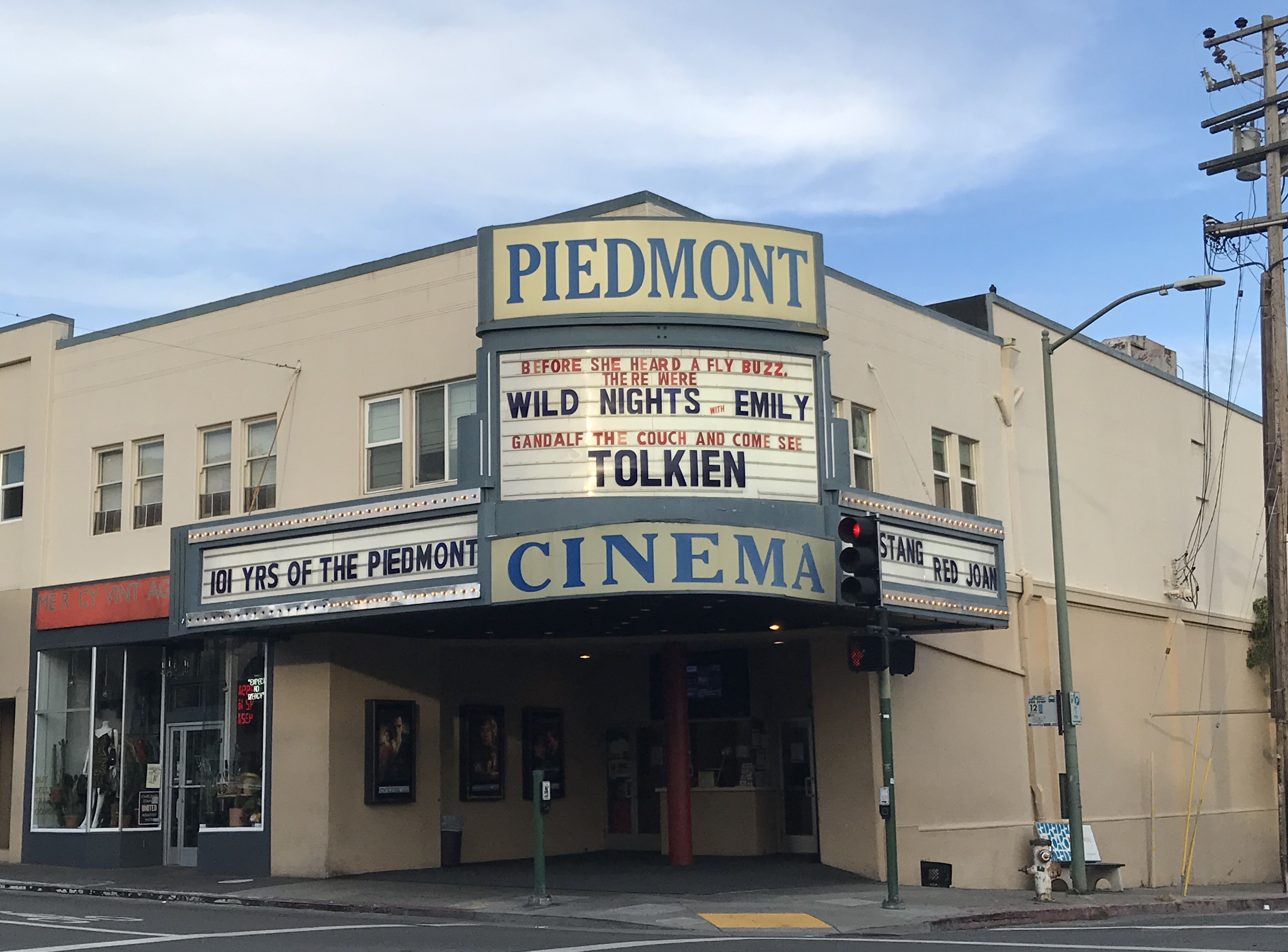
- The Piedmont Theatre in Oakland, California
- Interactive map of Piedmont Theatre
- Location: 4198 Piedmont Avenue; Oakland, California, US
- Coordinates: 37°49′38″N 122°15′03″W
- Operator: Landmark Theatres
- Type: Cinema
- Public transit: AC Transit

Construction
- Opened: 15 September 1917

Website
- www.landmarktheatres.com

The Piedmont Theatre, located on Piedmont Avenue in Oakland, California, is Oakland's oldest continuously operating movie theater.

== Background ==
Piedmont Theatrer was opened on 15 September 1917 by musician Dave Rosebrook as a single-screen theater with a Wurlitzer organ. In 1934, it underwent a major Art Deco remodeling by Alexander A. Cantin, during which the balcony was added. The Piedmont Theatre now focuses on independent and foreign cinema. As with the nearby Grand Lake Theatre, its balcony has been converted into two smaller theaters, bringing the total number of screens to three. It underwent further remodeling in 2011.

The Piedmont Theatre acts as a venue for multiple film festivals, including the San Francisco Jewish Film Festival, Frameline Film Festival, and CAAMFest.

It has been operated by Landmark Theatres since 1994.

A previous establishment called the Piedmont Theatre, located a few blocks south on Piedmont Avenue, was a nickelodeon run by Katherine Heber from 1914 to 1917.
