= Rockridge Market Hall =

Food hall in Oakland, California, US

Coordinates: 37°50′37.63″N 122°15′6.66″W

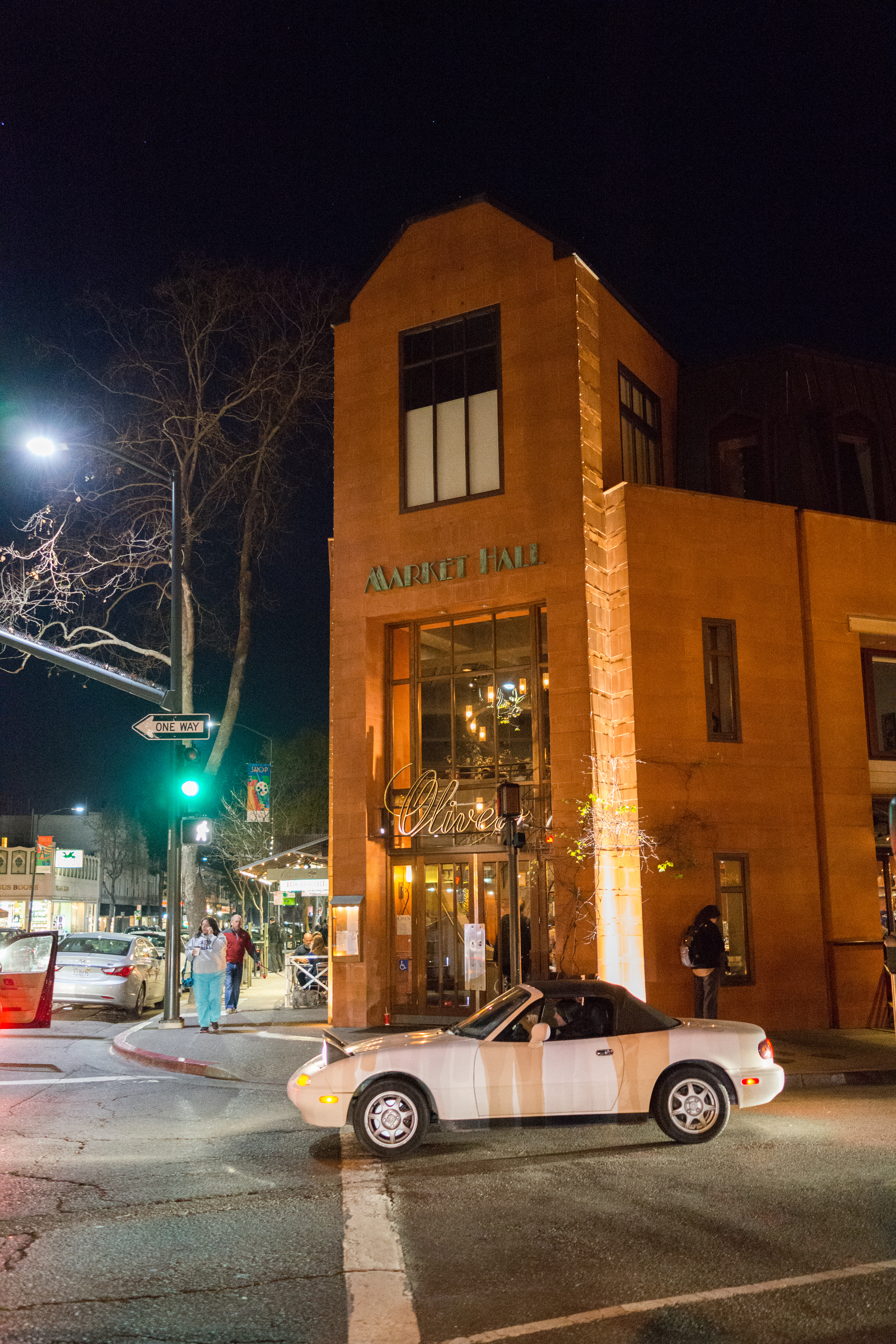
Rockridge Market Hall, exterior view at night, February 2015

Rockridge Market Hall is a market hall opened in 1987 in Rockridge, a neighborhood of Oakland, California. It contains nine stores, including a caterer, a specialty foods shop, a flower shop, a wine shop, a produce shop, a coffee roaster, a fish shop, a butcher shop and a bakery. The food hall is across from the Rockridge BART station. The neighborhood is noted for its concentration of upscale retail and food establishments.
