= Temescal Street Cinema =

Film festival in Oakland, California

The Temescal Street Cinema is a film festival that takes place weekly in the summer in the Temescal neighborhood of Oakland, California in the United States. It showcases films by San Francisco Bay Area filmmakers. The festival started in 2008. It was founded by Suzanne L’Heureux and Catarina Negrin. Films are projected onto the exterior wall of the Bank of the West building on Telegraph Avenue. Live music is performed before the films are shown. Films shown include The Waiting Room. Approximately 200 people attend the showings. Questions and answer sessions are held with the filmmakers after the viewing. The festival underwent a funding crisis in 2011. The festival was originally funded by the Temescal Telegraph Business Improvement District, who had to redistribute funding to other projects. The organizers held a Kickstarter campaign to raise the necessary funds. They successfully raised the money to fund the 2012 season. In 2011, the festival was voted "Best Local Film Festival" in the Readers' Choice Poll in East Bay Express.
