= Piedmont Avenue (Oakland, California) =

- Neighborhood of Oakland
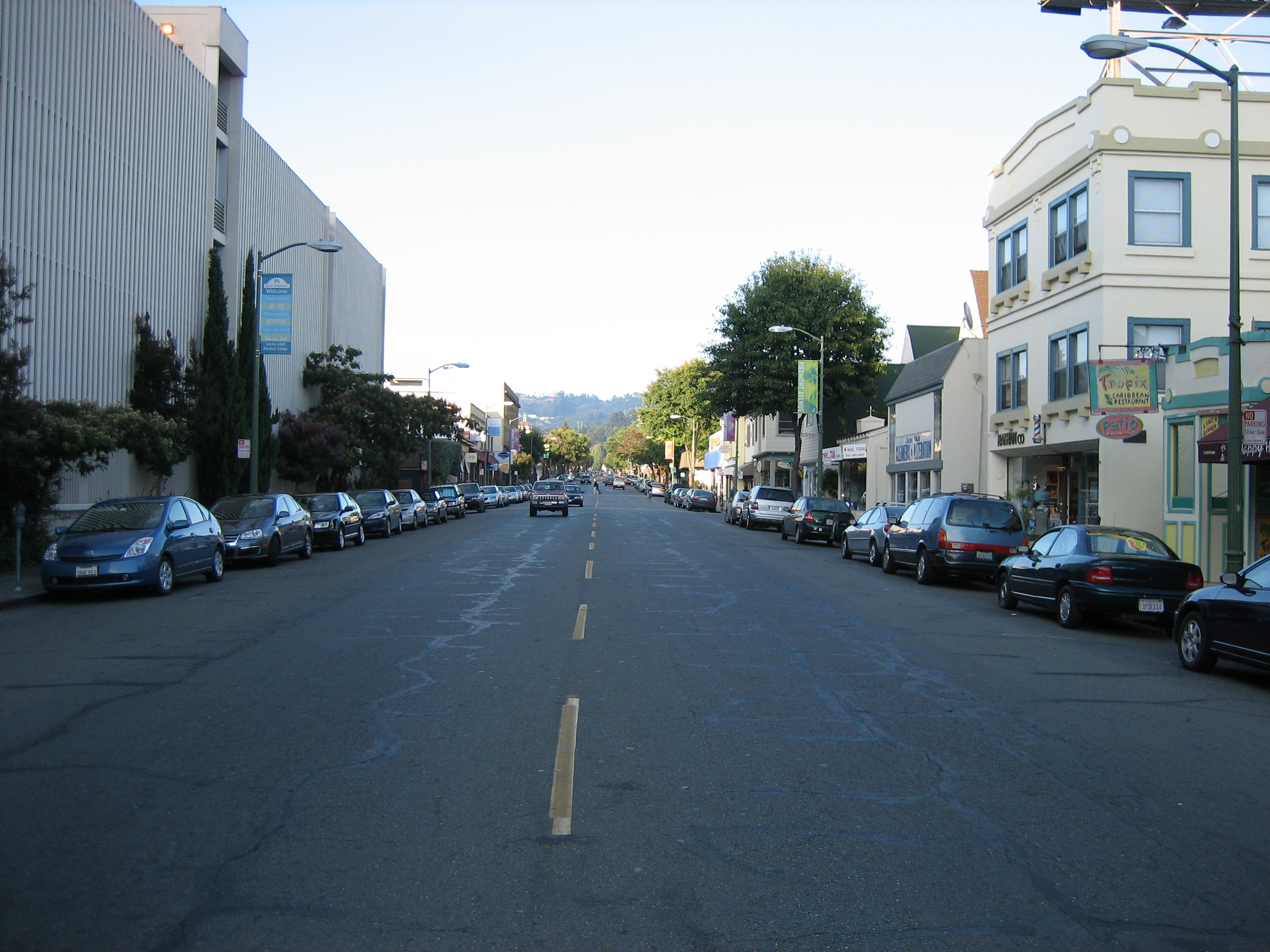
- A look up Piedmont Avenue

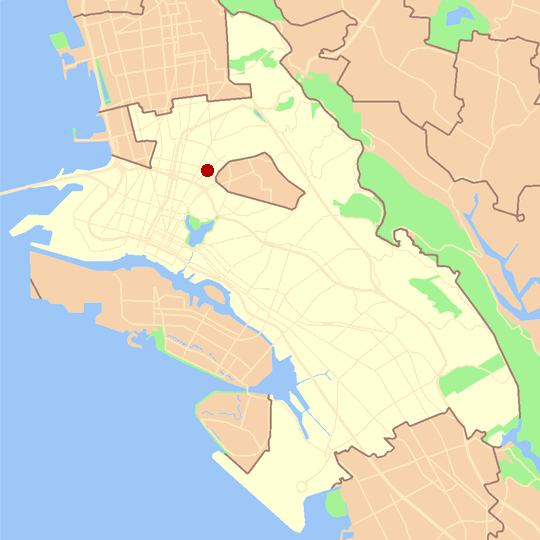
- Location in Oakland
- Coordinates: 37.8264°N 122.2524°W
- Country: United States
- State: California
- County: Alameda
- City: Oakland

The Piedmont Avenue neighborhood is a residential and commercial district in the North Oakland region of Oakland, California. It is named for Piedmont Avenue, a commercial street known for dining and retail. The neighborhood is roughly bounded by Temescal and Broadway on the west, Oakland Avenue and the City of Piedmont (a separate municipality, an enclave within Oakland) on the east, the Mountain View Cemetery on the north, and the MacArthur Freeway section of Interstate 580 on the south.

== History ==
The Piedmont Avenue neighborhood was founded in the late 1800s. It developed after Mountain View Cemetery opened in 1863, bringing visitors and public transportation. The area was annexed into Oakland in 1897.

The Key System ran their C Line streetcar down Piedmont between 41st Street and Grave Avenue, with passenger operations running between 1924 and 1958.

== Landmarks and features ==
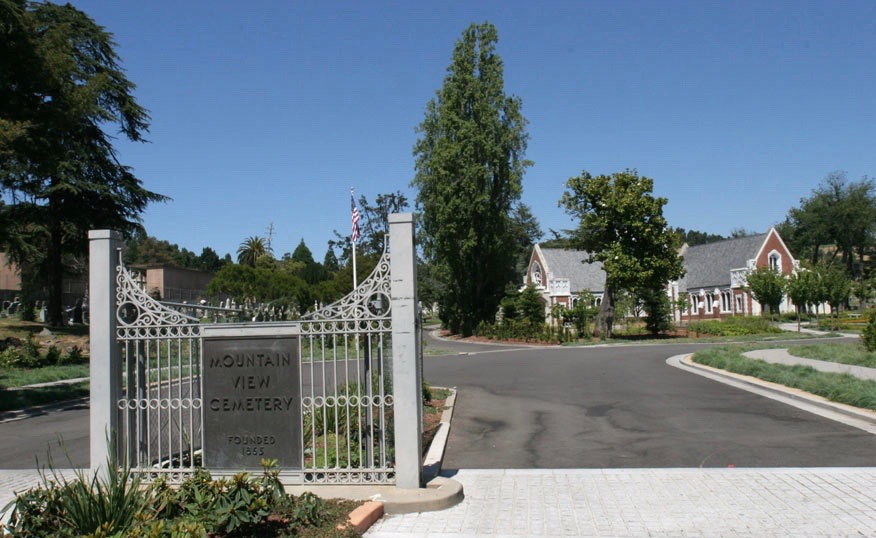
The gates of the Mountain View Cemetery at the end of Piedmont Avenue

At the north end of Piedmont Avenue and Pleasant Valley Avenue is the hillside Mountain View Cemetery, which was designed by Frederick Law Olmsted and opened in 1863. It is known for Millionaire's Row, a section high on the hill lined with the ornate mausoleums of wealthy families, including those of Domingo Ghirardelli, Henry J. Kaiser, and Charles Crocker. Other notable people buried in the cemetery include civil rights activists Fred Korematsu and Bobby Hutton, poet Ina Coolbrith, and architect Julia Morgan, who also designed the nearby Chapel of the Chimes. The cemetery was featured prominently in the 2018 movie Blindspotting.

Near the center of the Piedmont Avenue commercial strip, at 4021 Piedmont Ave. is another Julia Morgan-designed building, originally built as the Fred C. Turner Stores. This 1916 red brick building hosts both restaurants and retail, and features glazed terra cotta in the style of the della Robbia family.

Next door, at 4037 Piedmont Ave., is the location of the original Longs Drugs store, which opened in 1938. The building currently hosts a Posh Bagel.

Piedmont Avenue also has "the Bay Area's Book Row," with multiple independent bookstores concentrated within a six-block radius; the Piedmont Theatre, which is the oldest still-operating theater in Oakland (built in 1917); and the 1893 ice cream parlor Fentons Creamery, which was featured in Pixar's 2009 movie Up.

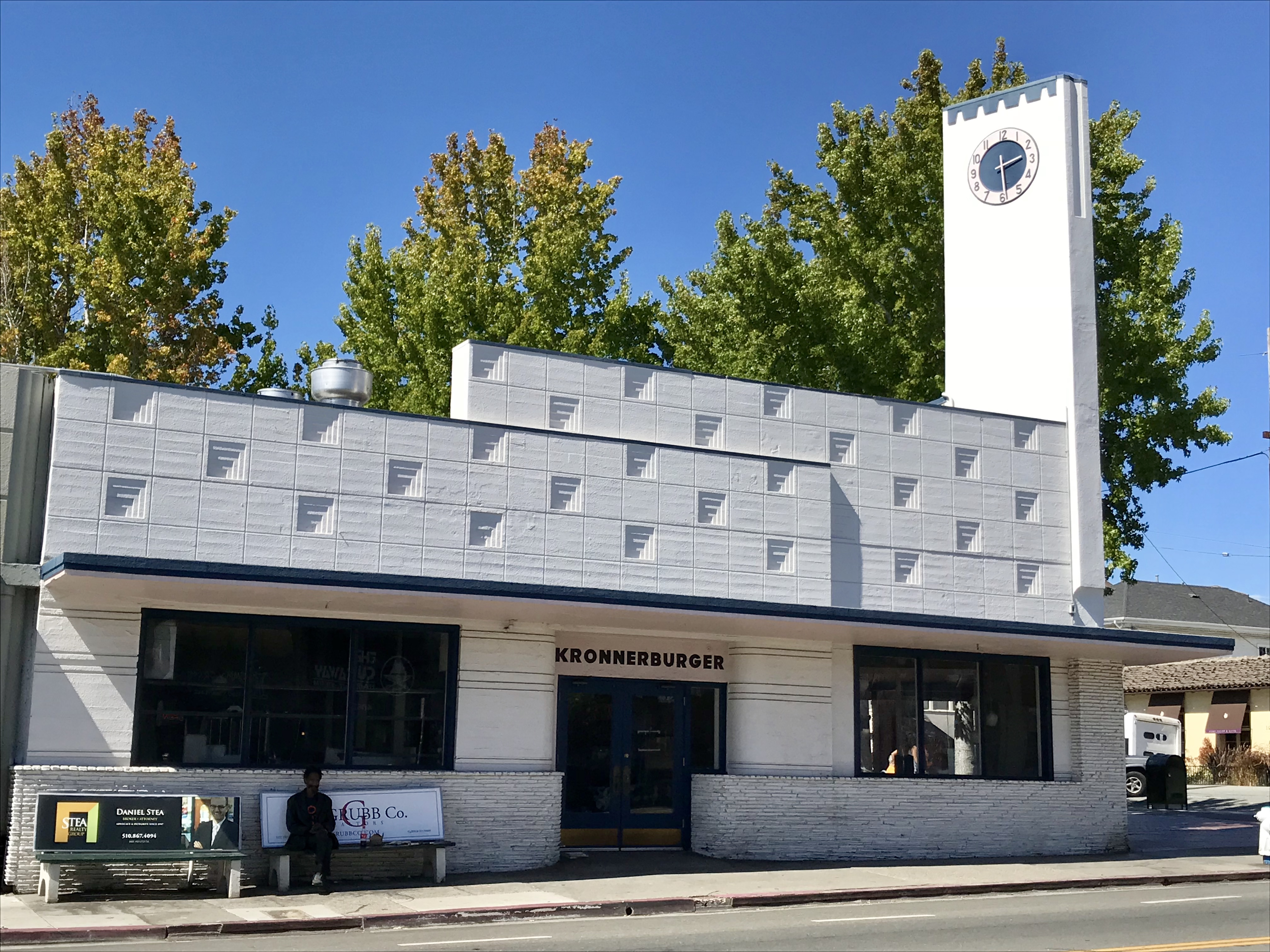
4063 Piedmont Ave., which was formerly a Key System station

At Piedmont Avenue and 41st Street are the Key Route Plaza and what is left of the Key System's C-line station, which was built in 1939. The former station is an angular building with a clock tower, which was restored by a group led by neighborhood activist Michael Lydon. In 2005, with support from the Piedmont Avenue Neighborhood Improvement League, Rocky Riche-Baird painted a mural recognizing the building's history, including the Key System's founder, Francis Marion Smith. However, a large part of the mural was controversially destroyed during renovations in 2014.

Another Riche-Baird mural about the area's native Ohlone people, "The Capture of the Solid. The Escape of the Soul," can be seen on the exterior 41st Street wall of 4150 Piedmont Ave.

Kaiser Permanente's flagship hospital campus is located in the southern part of the neighborhood. Nearby is Oak Glen Park, which contains an open-air section of Glen Echo Creek.

== Education ==
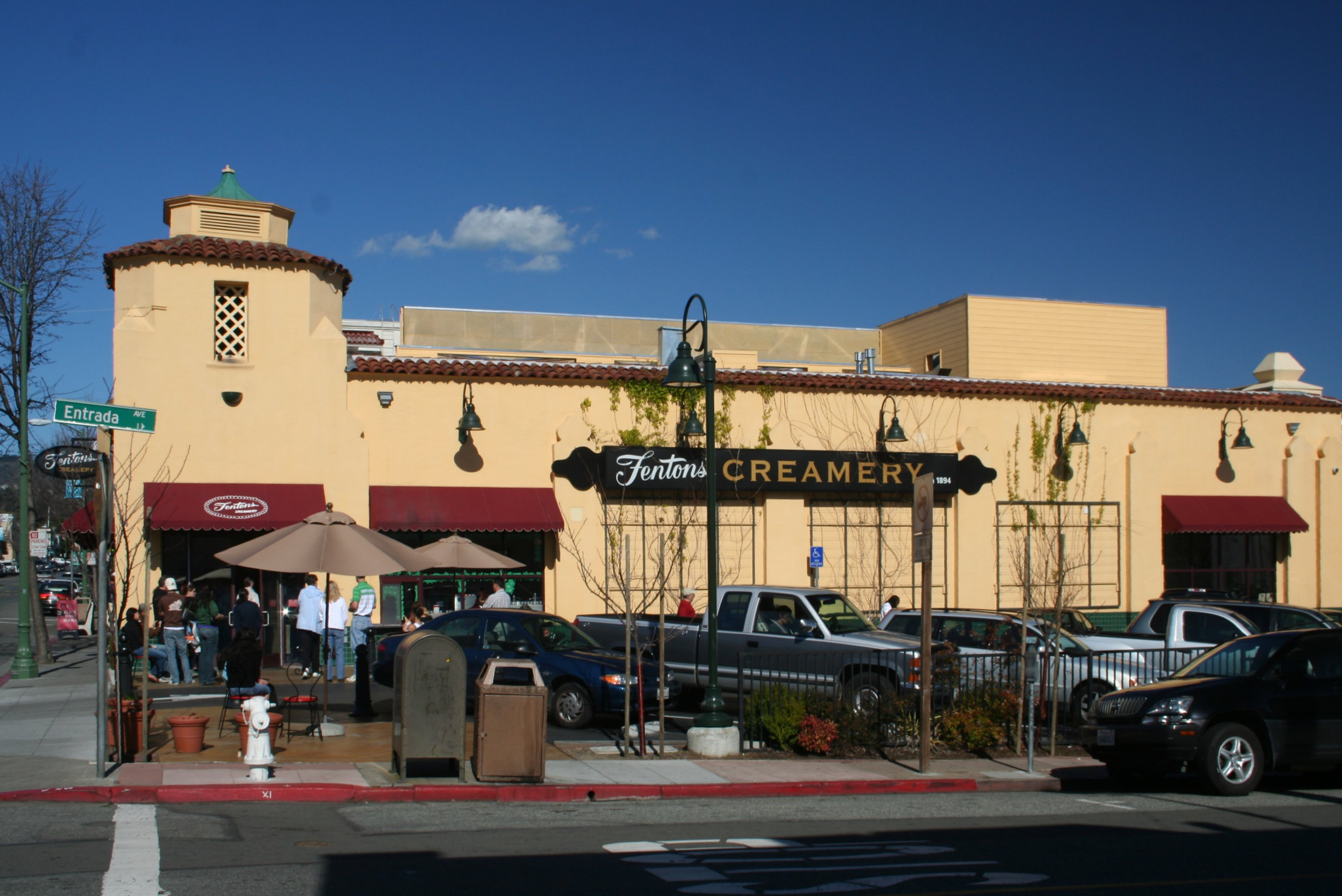
Fentons Creamery, an ice cream parlor on Piedmont Avenue

- Piedmont Avenue Elementary School of Oakland Unified School District
  - The school's campus hosts the Piedmont Avenue Branch of the Oakland Public Library
- St. Leo the Great Catholic School
