= Longfellow Elementary School =

Longfellow Elementary School may refer to:

- Longfellow Elementary School, Oakland, California, in the Oakland Unified School District. Closed in 2004, now the site of Oakland Military Institute.
- Longfellow Elementary School, San Francisco, California, in the San Francisco Unified School District
- Longfellow Elementary School, Whittier, California, in the Whittier City School District
- Longfellow Elementary School, Idaho Falls, Idaho, in the Idaho Falls School District
- Longfellow Elementary School, Buffalo Grove, Illinois, in Wheeling Community Consolidated School District 21
- Longfellow Elementary School, Oak Park, Illinois, in Oak Park Elementary School District 97
- Longfellow Elementary School, Wheaton, Illinois in Community Unit School District 200
- Longfellow Elementary School, Iowa City, Iowa, in the Iowa City Community School District
- Longfellow Elementary School, Portland, Maine, of the Portland Public Schools
- Longfellow Elementary School, Columbia, Maryland, of the Howard County Public School System
- Longfellow Elementary School, Holland, Michigan, of the Holland Public Schools
- Longfellow Elementary School, Fargo, North Dakota, of the Fargo Public Schools
- Longfellow Elementary School, Minot, North Dakota, of the Minot Public Schools
- Longfellow Elementary School, Toledo, Ohio, in the Toledo City School District
- Longfellow Elementary School, Houston, Texas, an elementary school in the Houston Independent School District
- Longfellow Elementary School, West Allis, Wisconsin, in the West Allis – West Milwaukee School District
