= C (AC Transit) =

Bus service in Oakland and San Leandro, California

Overview
- Operator: Key System (1906–1960); AC Transit (1960–2020)
- Began service: 1903
- Ended service: 2020

Route
- Locale: Piedmont, Oakland, San Francisco
- Start: Highland Ave. & Highland Way
- Via: Moraga, Piedmont, 40th
- End: Salesforce Transit Center
- Map: C

The C was a bus service operated by AC Transit in the San Francisco Bay Area. It is one of the operator's many transbay routes, which are intended to provide riders a long-distance service across the San Francisco Bay between the East Bay and San Francisco. It connected San Francisco with Piedmont Avenue in Oakland and the City of Piedmont. The service was descendant of a Key System streetcar and ferry line that operated prior to the formation of AC Transit. The line was suspended in response to the COVID-19 pandemic.

== History ==
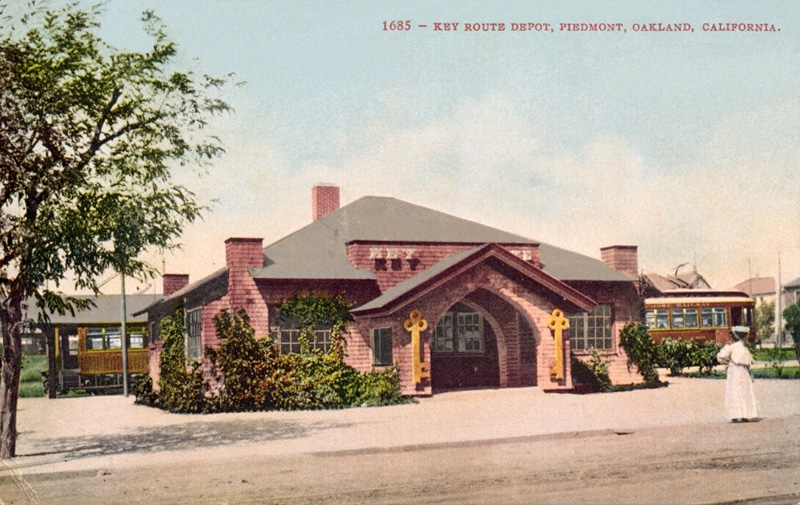
Early divided back postcard of the Key System station at Piedmont and 41st, postmarked 1908

After opening the successful Berkeley line, the Key System's greater corporate interests sought to develop real estate in new neighborhoods adjacent to new streetcar lines. The company's second line was built spurring off the Berkeley main line at Yerba Buena, continuing onto 40th and through a new cutting between Broadway and Howe to turn onto Piedmont, ending at 41st Street. The line on 40th east of Grove was rebuilt from a narrow gauge line originally built by the Oakland Consolidated Street Railway. Shuttle service was established in late 1903, and full ferry train service commenced on June 1, 1904. New cars from a scaled-back Lehigh Valley Transit Company expansion were ordered just prior to the line's opening; these were in service for the first several months until new rolling stock matching the Berkeley line was delivered. Local shuttle service was retained with two-axle "dinky" streetcars as a term of the old 40th Street charter. The new service was referred to as the Piedmont Line.

Starting on November 21, 1924, the line was extended along existing streetcar tracks on Piedmont, running north to Grand to enter the right of way of the company's abandoned San Jose interurban line as far as Oakland Avenue adjacent to Latham Street. Partial bus replacement commenced in May 1931 as part of a cost cutting measure and conversion to one-man operation.

Cars began running across the San Francisco–Oakland Bay Bridge to the Transbay Terminal upon the facility's opening in 1939. The Key System adopted letter designations for its transbay routes at this time, with the Piedmont Line designated as route C. Rail service ended after April 20, 1958, and motor coaches began operating on the line.

=== Public ownership ===
AC Transit took over operation of the Key System's assets in October 1960. The C line was extended to Highland and Magnolia on June 30, 1963.

Buses ceased serving the Transbay Terminal on August 7, 2010, and the San Francisco terminus was moved to the Temporary Transbay Terminal. The C line began running to the Salesforce Transit Center on August 12, 2018. The service was suspended in 2020 amid the COVID-19 pandemic.
