= Bushrod Washington James =

American homeopath (1836–1903)

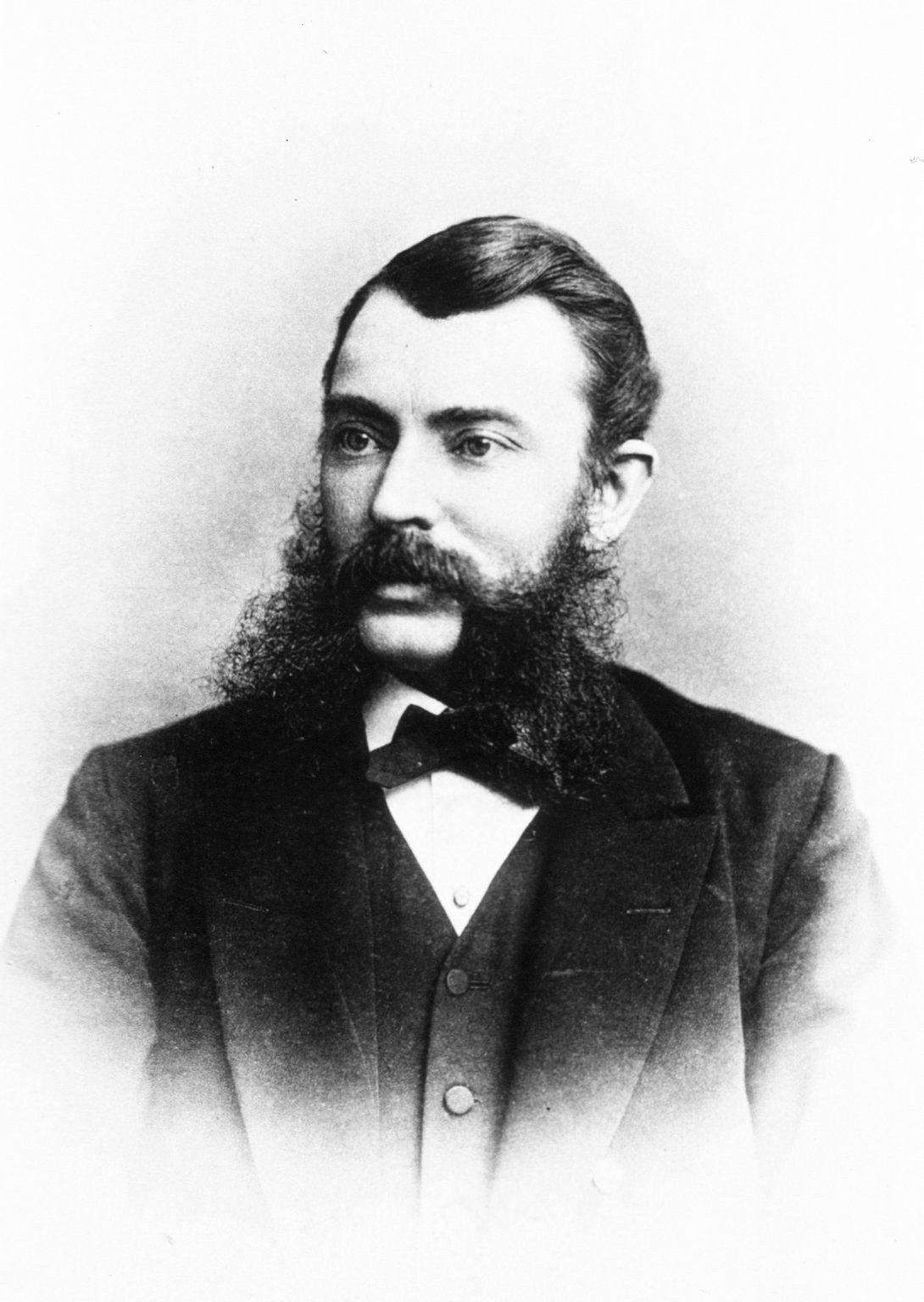
- Born: August 25, 1836; Philadelphia, Pennsylvania, U.S.
- Died: January 6, 1903 (aged 66)
- Resting place: West Laurel Hill Cemetery, Bala Cynwyd, Pennsylvania, U.S.
- Education: Homeopathic College of Pennsylvania (1857)
- Medical career
- Profession: homeopath

Bushrod Washington James (August 25, 1836 – January 6, 1903) was an American homeopath, surgeon, educator, writer, and philanthropist. He worked as an eye doctor for seventeen years at the Children's Homoeopathic Hospital and founded the Bushrod James Ear and Eye Institute. He was a consulting physician at Hahnemann Hospital and chair of physiology, climatology, and sanitary science for the New York Medical College for Women. During the American Civil War he served as a member of the United States Christian Commission and as a volunteer surgeon. He served as president of the American Institute of Homeopathy and the Pennsylvania Medical Society.

He bequeathed land and money for the maintenance of the Bushrod Washington James Eye and Ear Institute as well as creation of a school of domestic science at the American Temperance University, Bushrod Park, and the Bushrod branch of the Free Library of Philadelphia.

== Early life and education ==
James was born August 25, 1836, to David and Amanda James, in Somerton, a village later incorporated into Philadelphia. He was educated by private teachers and graduated from Philadelphia Central High School. He graduated from the Homeopathic College of Pennsylvania in 1857. He studied surgery under David Hayes Agnew at the Philadelphia School of Anatomy.

== Career ==
He worked as an attending physician at the Northern Home for Friendless Children. He gained extensive experience in ophthalmology and successfully treated 500 cases of ophthalmia at the home. He worked as an eye doctor for seventeen years at the Children's Homoeopathic Hospital. He founded the Bushrod James Ear and Eye Institute. He was a consulting physician at Hahnemann Hospital, an advisory board member for the Hahnemann Medical College, and a trustee of the Spring Garden Institute.

He served as a delegate for the American Institute of Homeopathy and later as its president. In 1857, he served as president of the Pennsylvania Medical Society. He was chair of physiology, climatology, and sanitary science for three years at the New York Medical College for Women.

During the American Civil War, he served as a member of the United States Christian Commission, as a volunteer surgeon during the Battle of Antietam and the Battle of Gettysburg, and as a surgeon at an Army hospital in Philadelphia.

He was a frequent contributor to medical literature and published several books of poetry and about his travels in the United States and Europe.

He was a member of the American Academy of Political and Social Science, American Association for the Advancement of Science, the American Public Health Association, the Academy of Natural Sciences, the Franklin Institute, the Historical Society of Pennsylvania, the Sons of the Revolution, and the Union League of Philadelphia. He was an honorary member of the Medical Society of the State of New York and the British Homeopathic Society. He was a Freemason and a member of the Grand Lodge of Pennsylvania.

He died January 6, 1903, and was interred at Monument Cemetery. In 1956, his remains and monument were moved to West Laurel Hill Cemetery in Bala Cynwyd, Pennsylvania.

== Philanthropy ==
He never married and left his fortune to charity. In his will, he bequeathed money to be used for a library at his home in Logan Square. Decades after he died, the Free Library of Philadelphia used his endowment to build the Bushrod branch in Northeast Philadelphia in 1950. He also left $55,000 in cash and property for the maintenance of the Bushrod Washington James Eye and Ear Institute. He bequeathed property to the city of Oakland, California, for the creation of Bushrod Park; and to Coronado, California, for the creation of the Bushrod Washington James Institute for the education of children. He left property and $5,000 to the American Temperance University in Harriman, Tennessee, for the creation of a school of domestic science and an educational fund.

== Publications ==
- Rules for the Treatment of Asiatic Cholera Homoeopathically, Philadelphia: F.E. Boericke, 1872
- Improvements in Surgery, 1872
- American Resorts: With Notes Upon Their Climate, Philadelphia: F.A. Davis, 1889
- Alaskana: Or, Alaska in Descriptive and Legendary Poems, Philadelphia: Porter & Coates, 1892
- Alaska's Great Future - The Decision Regarding Bering Sea, 1894
- Echoes of Battle, Philadelphia: H.T. Coates & Company, 1895
- Alaska, Its Neglected Past, Its Brilliant Future, Philadelphia: The Sunshine publishing company, 1897
- The Political Freshman, Philadelphia, 1902
