= Grand Lake Theatre =

Movie Theater, in Oakland, California

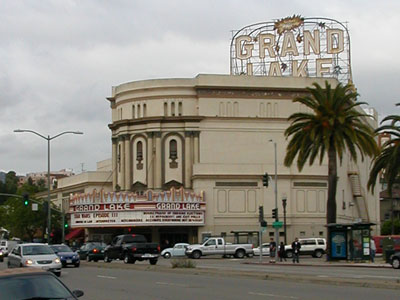
- View of the Grand Lake Theatre
- Interactive map of Grand Lake Theatre
- Location: 3200 Grand Avenue; Oakland, California, US
- Coordinates: 37°48′42″N 122°14′50″W
- Owner: Renaissance Rialto, Inc.
- Operator: Renaissance Rialto, Inc.
- Type: Cinema
- Public transit: AC Transit

Construction
- Opened: March 6, 1926

Website
- www.renaissancerialto.com

The Grand Lake Theatre is a historic movie palace located at 3200 Grand Avenue and Lake Park Avenue in the Grand Lake neighborhood of Oakland, California.

== History ==
The Grand Lake Theater, designed as a single auditorium theater by Architects Reid & Reid for local businessmen Abraham C. Karski and Louis Kaliski, held its grand opening on March 6, 1926. On August 1, 1929, Abraham C. Karski and Louis Kaliski leased the theater to West Coast Theatres, Inc. for a period of 94 years, 4 months until November 30, 2023. The descendants of Abraham C. Karski and Louis Kaliski owned the Theatre for nearly nine decades, operating it under the original lease terms although assigning it twice (to Mann Theaters Corporation of California (who later became National General Theaters, Inc.) in 1973 and to the current tenant Renaissance Rialto, Inc. in 1980.)

After the Grand Lake Theater opened on March 6, 1926, it held vaudeville and silent movie showings, but with the arrival of "talkies" it began to exclusively show sound films. The original Wurlitzer Hope Jones Unified Orchestral Organ by the Rudolph Wurlitzer Co. of San Francisco was removed in 1959, and a larger Wurlitzer was installed in 1980. The original phone number for the theater was Glencourt 3100 and the original ticket prices were 40 cents for night and Sunday matinees in the orchestra and balcony, 50 cents for the loges, 25 cents for daily matinees, and 10 cents for children at any performance.

The theater's exterior is surmounted by a giant illuminated rooftop sign which was originally furnished by Brumfield Electric Sign Co., Inc. Neoclassical faux columns and urns line the main interior space and the ceiling is adorned with a crystal chandelier in the lobby and classical frescos in the auditorium. The theater's interior artwork is considered to be Art Deco.

After purchasing the lease in 1980, Renaissance Rialto, Inc., owned by Allen Michaan, spent millions on renovation and expansion. In 1981, the balcony of the auditorium was split into a second auditorium. In 1985, neighboring storefronts were purchased and attached to the theater. These were transformed into a small Egyptian Revival styled auditorium and a small Moorish styled auditorium. After the expansions of the 1980s, the Grand Lake Theatre had a total of four screens and 1619 seats. The main auditorium is also equipped with a Mighty Wurlitzer organ hidden beneath the floor. On Friday and Saturday evenings, the historical organ rises for a brief concert before the movie.

Most recently, Allen Michaan has spent hundreds of thousands to install twin 3-D projectors in two of the Oakland movie palace's theaters - similar to the state-of-the-art setup Pixar has in its private screening auditorium, and also repainted the building. The Theater's 95-year lease was set to expire on November 30, 2023; prior to this, however, longtime tenant Allen Michaan purchased the Grand Lake Theatre in August 2018.

On March 16, 2020, the Theatre was temporarily closed due to the COVID-19 pandemic. The Theatre reopened on May 27, 2021.

== The Roof Sign ==
The sign mounted on top of the Grand Lake Theatre is the largest rotary contact sign west of the Mississippi River. It measures 52 feet (15.85m) high by 72 feet (21.95m) wide and consists of 2,800 colored bulbs and was designed by Theodore Wetteland. The firing sequence is controlled by a device much like a music box. The sign is typically lit Friday and Saturday, from dusk until the start of the last show of the night.

== Politics ==
Current owner Michaan is known to use his liberal politics as a guide in managing the Grand Lake. In 2004, he publicly announced that the theater would not enforce the R rating of the political documentary Fahrenheit 9/11. The Grand Lake has also received widespread recognition for Michaan's use of the marquee as a political message board. In outrage at the 2000 presidential election, he posted this message on the high-traffic side of the marquee: "This Is America — Every Vote Should Be Counted" Since then, and with much support from the local community, Michaan has regularly used one side of the theater's marquee to display a timely political message. In addition to films, the theater also occasionally hosts talks and events on progressive political issues. In November 2005, the Theatre served as a center for relief efforts for victims of Hurricane Katrina that Congresswoman Barbara Lee coordinated.

Between the midterm elections of November 2006 and January 2007, no political messages were displayed on the marquee, instead devoting the space to the names of upcoming films. Messages began to appear again in early January, beginning with "All that is necessary for the triumph of evil is that good men do nothing," a statement derived from Edmund Burke's 1770 speech to Parliament, "Thoughts on the Cause of Present Discontents."

On September 9 and 10, 2009, the fifth 9/11 Film Festival was presented at the Grand Lake Theatre. The theater premiered Dylan Avery's Loose Change 9/11: An American Coup, narrated by Daniel Sunjata and produced by Korey Rowe and Matthew Brown.

On November 2, 2011, the Grand Lake Theatre closed its doors in support of the Occupy Oakland general strike. The marquee read "We proudly support the Occupy Wall Street Movement. Closed Wed. to support the strike."

The Rachel Maddow Show featured the theater on November 2, 2011, as part of the video segment covering that day's Occupy Oakland protest and general strike. Maddow, a native of nearby Castro Valley, said that the Grand Lake Theatre was one of her favorite landmarks when she was growing up and is still a favorite of hers as an adult today. See the Rachel Maddow Show Nov 2nd transcript for her full statement about the Grand Lake Theatre.

More recently, hundreds also gathered outside the Theatre in December 2019 in support of the Impeachment of Donald Trump, which the Theatre's marquee staunchly supported.

On January 13th of 2026, demonstrators formed in front of the theater to protest ICE.

== Culture ==
Designations

Oakland Designated Landmark
- Designated: 1981
- Reference no.: 52

- The Grand Lake was featured prominently on Michael Moore's website when it announced on its marquee, "We will not enforce the R rating for Fahrenheit 9/11." Photo
- A picture of the theater marquee was used in a Choice Hotels commercial (to the tune of Johnny Cash's "I've Been Everywhere"). Photo

== Notable Customers ==
- Reverend Jesse Jackson
- Congresswoman Barbara Lee
- Congresswoman Cynthia McKinney
- Filmmaker Dylan Avery
- Filmmaker Ryan Coogler
- Filmmaker George Lucas
- Filmmaker Steven Spielberg
- Actor Danny Glover
- Actor Sean Penn
- Actor Tom Hanks
- Investigative Journalist Greg Palast
- Comedian Greg Proops
- Author Vincent Bugliosi

== See also ==
- Paramount Theatre (Oakland, California)
- Fox Oakland Theatre
- Piedmont Theatre
