= Oakland Military Institute =

Coordinates: 37.8294°N 122.2725°W

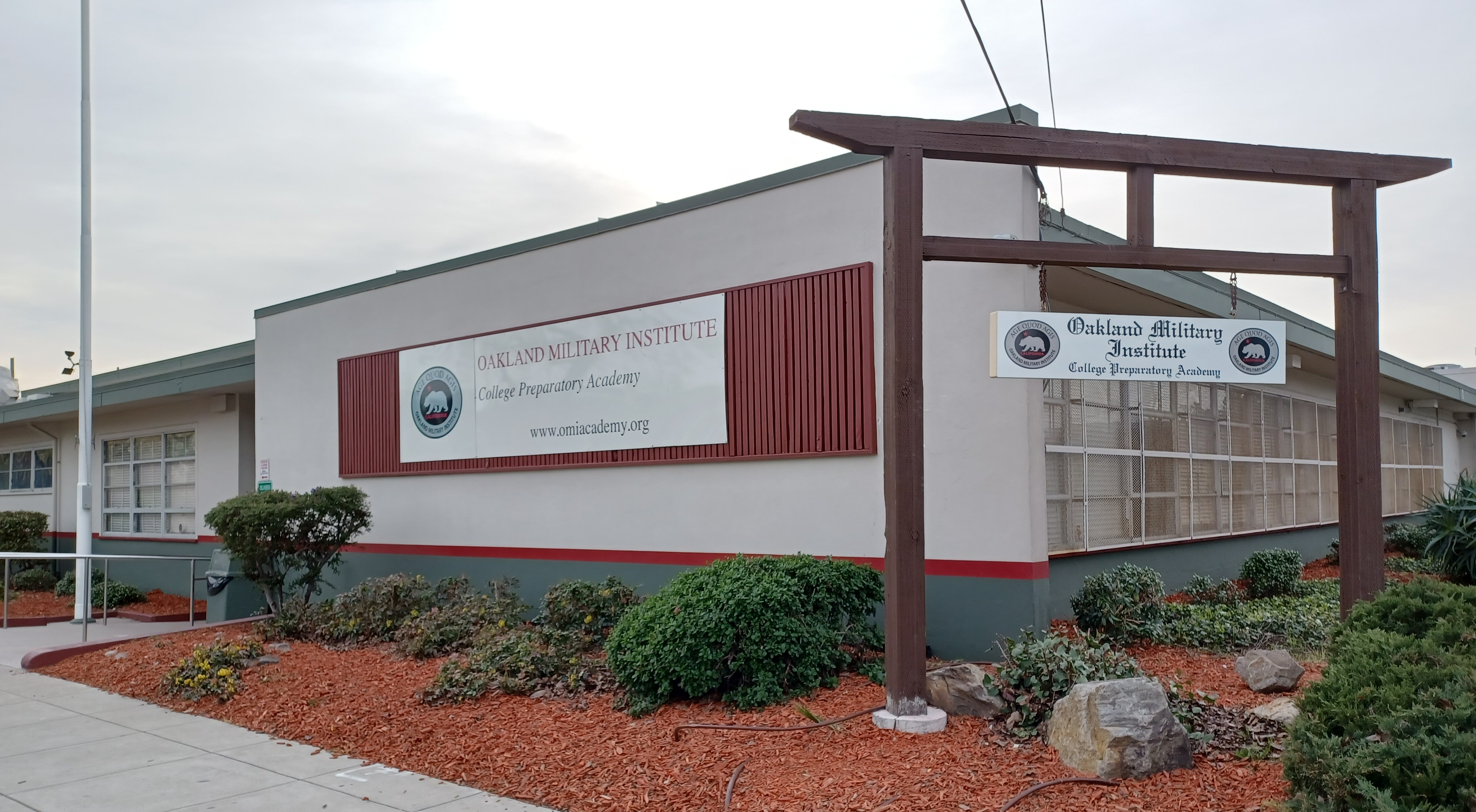
- 3877 Lusk Street; Oakland, California 94608; United States

Information
- Type: Charter, College-prep, Day; Military school
- Motto: Age Quod Agis (Do Well Whatever You Do)
- Established: 2001
- School district: Oakland USD
- Superintendent: Mary Streshly
- Commandant: Thomas James
- Grades: 6–12
- Campus size: 645
- Campus type: Suburban
- Colors: Black, tan, Vegas gold
- Athletics conference: CIF North Coast Section (Bay Area Conference)
- Team name: Grizzlies
- Accreditation: WASC
- Website: www.oakmil.org

Oakland Military Institute, formally the Oakland Military Institute College Preparatory Academy, is a charter school in Oakland, California run by the California Military Department's Youth and Community Programs Task Force in partnership with the Oakland Unified School District (OUSD).

Oakland Military Institute's mission is "to provide a structured and rigorous academic program where cadets develop as leaders, scholars, critical thinkers, and citizens." The school's cadets are members of the California Cadet Corps. The teaching staff are employees of the Oakland Unified School District while the Military Staff are member of the California National Guard and the California State Guard.

Ideally, students will go on to attend college. In addition to academics, the school develops leadership in its students through an elective class which all students take every year. They are assigned to a large group of students, or a Company, which they are a part of for all their years in the school. Students are mentored by the military staff in these groups to grow as disciplined adults and leaders of character.

== History ==
Oakland Military Institute was founded in 2001 after a two-year campaign led by then Oakland Mayor Jerry Brown. Governor Gray Davis helped secure the charter after local school boards rejected the proposals. It is the first charter school sponsored and run by the California Military Department and the first public military school sponsored by the National Guard. The school site, at its inception, was located at 2405 West 14th Street (adjacent to the Port of Oakland) in portable classrooms on the site of the Oakland Army Base, which had recently been decommissioned in 1999. AC Transit provided a dedicated bus line for student transportation to the base. Hundreds of applications were submitted from all over the East Bay and each prospective student was required to appear with their parent/guardian.

The process for acceptance into the institute consisted of a in-person interview with a panel that included a military member, faculty member, administrator and representative from the mayor's office. The amount of application for entry into the first class required the staff to hold a lottery for acceptance at the Oakland Army Base Theater to determine which applicants would be allowed to attend a two-week summer camp held in Camp San Luis Obispo. The first class of 167 seventh-graders enrolled in August 2001, under the direction of Commandant Colonel Bradford M. Jones, Command Sergeant Major Alex Cabassa and Academic Director Rick Moniz.

On May 17, 2007, Oakland Military Institute relocated from the Oakland Army Base to 3877 Lusk Street in the Longfellow neighborhood of Oakland. This location had been the former site of Longfellow Elementary School, an OUSD primary school that had closed in 2004 and was repurposed for use by OMI. In August 2012, OMI opened a 15,000 square foot state of the art facility to serve sixth grade and house science classrooms, music and art classes, and a library and computer lab and virtual learning center.
