= Longfellow (surname) =

Longfellow is a surname. Notable people with the surname include:

- Alexander Wadsworth Longfellow Jr. (1854–1934), American architect
- Henry Wadsworth Longfellow (1807–1882), American poet and professor
- Ki Longfellow (1944–2022), American writer
- Malvina Longfellow (1889–1962), American stage and silent movie actress
- Mary King Longfellow (1852–1945), American painter
- Michael Longfellow (born 1994), American comedian and actor
- Richard M. Longfellow (1867–1951), United States Army Private
- Samuel Longfellow (1819–1892), American clergyman and hymn writer
- Stephen Longfellow (1776–1849), member of the United States House of Representatives
