= Temescal, Oakland, California =

Temescal
- Neighborhood of Oakland
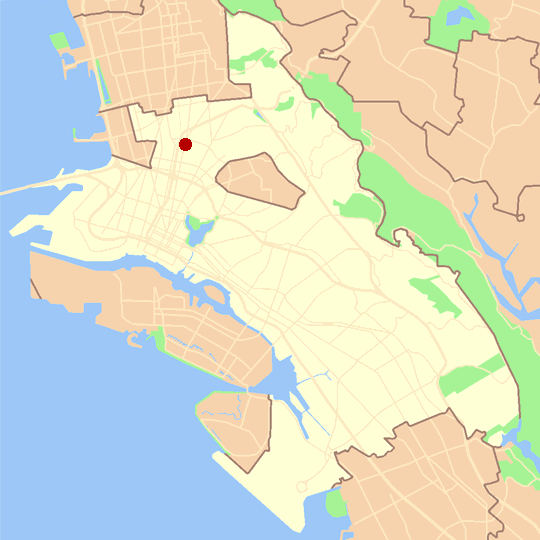
- Location of Temescal in Oakland
- Coordinates: 37.837222°N 122.262222°W
- Country: United States
- State: California
- County: Alameda
- City: Oakland
- Established: Settled in 1860s

Temescal is one of the oldest neighborhoods in Oakland, California, located in North Oakland, and centered on Telegraph Avenue. The neighborhood derives its name from Temescal Creek, a significant watercourse in the city.

== History ==
Temescal was originally a separate unincorporated village that had built up around the estate of Vicente Peralta, which was located near the modern intersections of Telegraph Avenue and Claremont Boulevard. (Vicente's estate was part of the larger Peralta Grant that spanned 44,800 acres of land in the East Bay.) The name came from the creek upon whose banks Peralta had established his home. The word temescal derives from the word temescalli/temazcalli (various transliterations), which means "sweat lodge" in the Nahuatl language of the Mexica ("Aztec") people of Mexico. It is surmised that the Peraltas or perhaps one of their ranch hands (vaqueros) had seen local indigenous (Ohlone) structures along the creek similar to those in other parts of New Spain which were called temescalli.

A post office opened in North Temescal in 1877. The name was changed to Alden in 1899. The name commemorated S.E. Alden, farmer and landowner. In 1908, the Alden post office was designated as Station E of the Oakland post office.

In 1897, the residents of Temescal voted to join the City of Oakland in an effort to gain access to higher quality public schools and police services. At the time that the City of Oakland annexed Temescal, Temescal was considered to consist of all land north of 36th Street (the northern bound of the City of Oakland at the time) between the Emeryville city limit to the west and Broadway to the east.

Temescal has long been an important junction of several principal thoroughfares: Telegraph, Claremont, and Shattuck Avenues, and 51st Street.

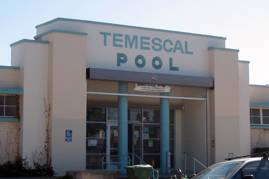
The Temescal Pool on 45th St. in Oakland

Until the early 20th century, a wide wooden bridge spanned Temescal Creek, carrying both road (Telegraph Avenue) and railroad tracks.

The horsecar line to the University of California along today's Telegraph Avenue (then called Humboldt Avenue in Oakland and Choate in Berkeley) operated out of a horse barn at 51st and Telegraph. When the horsecar was replaced by electric streetcars, the horse barn was replaced by a carbarn. The carbarn became the Western Carhouse of the Key System's streetcar division, the East Bay Street Railways. When the streetcars ceased operation in November 1947, the car barn was remodeled to become Vern's market. Vern's closed in the 1970s and the building sat vacant for years. Eventually it was demolished and replaced by a strip mall, including a Walgreens store.

== Geography ==
The neighborhood's boundaries have changed substantially over time and have often been considered different by different groups of people. The modern neighborhood's western bound is generally considered to be the Grove-Shafter Freeway (State Route 24), due to the visual divide of the elevated freeway. However, some consider Martin Luther King Jr. Way to be the western border. The eastern bound is generally considered to be Broadway. The northern bound historically is considered to end at Alcatraz Avenue & Shattuck (at the South Berkeley border), and the southern bound to be either 36th or 40th Street.

== Demographics ==
Temescal is primarily a residential neighborhood. Most of the houses in Temescal are early twentieth century bungalows along tree-lined streets. There are also many multi-family homes and mid-size apartment complexes interspersed throughout the neighborhood.

Temescal was an Italian-American neighborhood until the late 1960s. Temescal saw many changes in demographics in the past 10 years as new developments and upscale shopping and restaurants entered the neighborhood. Large numbers of young couples with children moved to Temescal as the real estate prices in nearby Rockridge grew too expensive for middle-class families. People of different racial and economic backgrounds live side by side in the neighborhood. Temescal is a diverse neighborhood with concentrations of Ethiopian and Eritrean immigrants.

== Arts and culture ==
The commercial heart of Temescal is Telegraph Avenue, between the MacArthur BART Station and 51st Street. This area is known locally as the home to popular restaurants including North Light.

Another commercial zone runs along 40th Street, between Broadway and Telegraph. This area includes a mixture of food service and retail.

There are many Ethiopian restaurants here, especially on Telegraph north of 51st Street. There are also many Korean establishments along Telegraph Avenue. Temescal Farmers' Market, begun in 2006, is held on Sundays in the parking lot of the Department of Motor Vehicles facility on Claremont Ave.

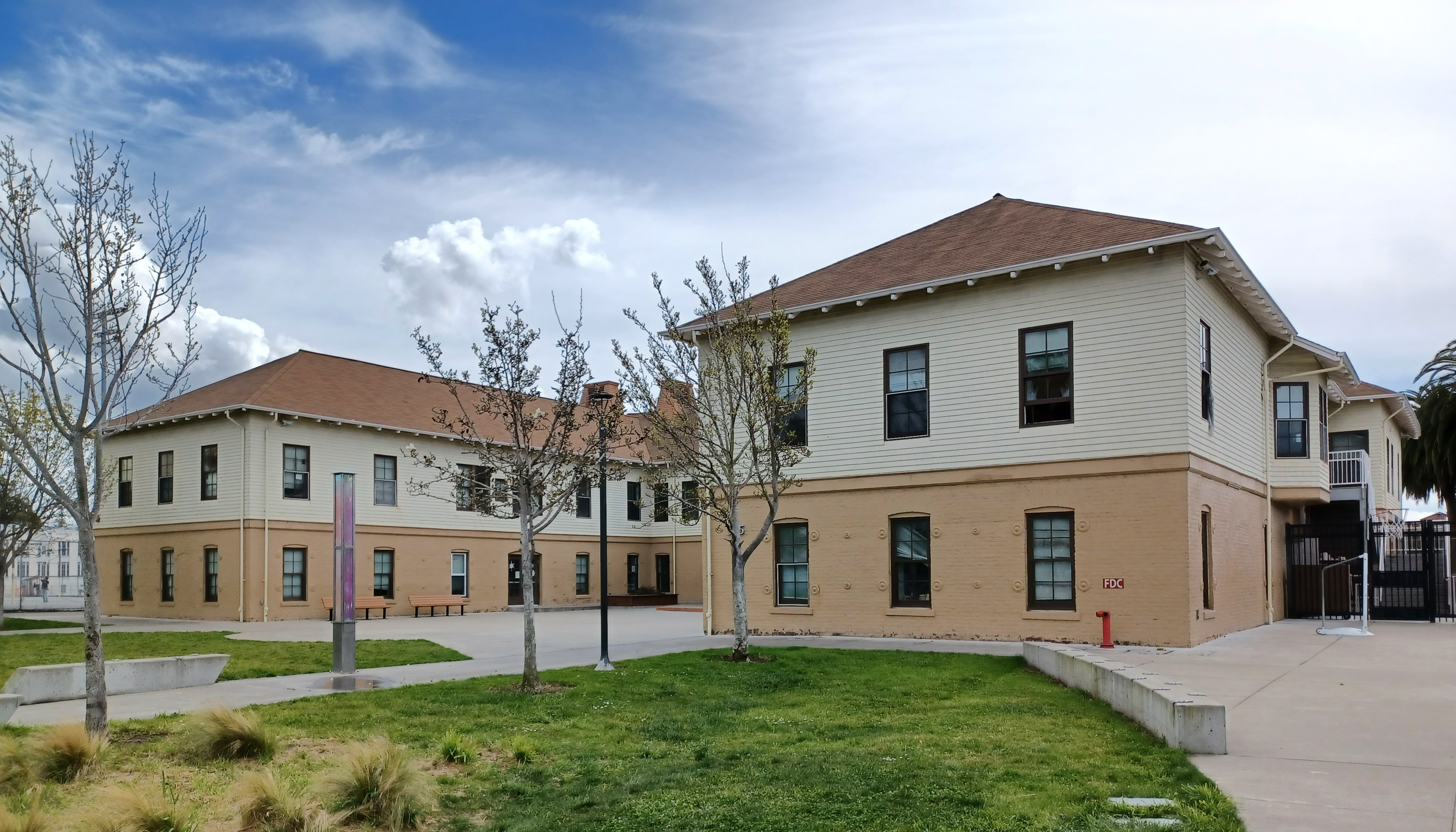
Studio One Art Center

Studio One, located on 45th Street, is home to art classes and workshops. Counter Culture Labs is a public laboratory and hackerspace located in the Temescal neighborhood. Royal Nonesuch Gallery is an artist run art and event space located on Telegraph and 43rd. Temescal Pool, located next door, is open to the public. The neighborhood is also home to several public and private schools, including Park Day School and the architectural landmark Oakland Technical High School on Broadway.

=== Oakland Tool Lending Library ===
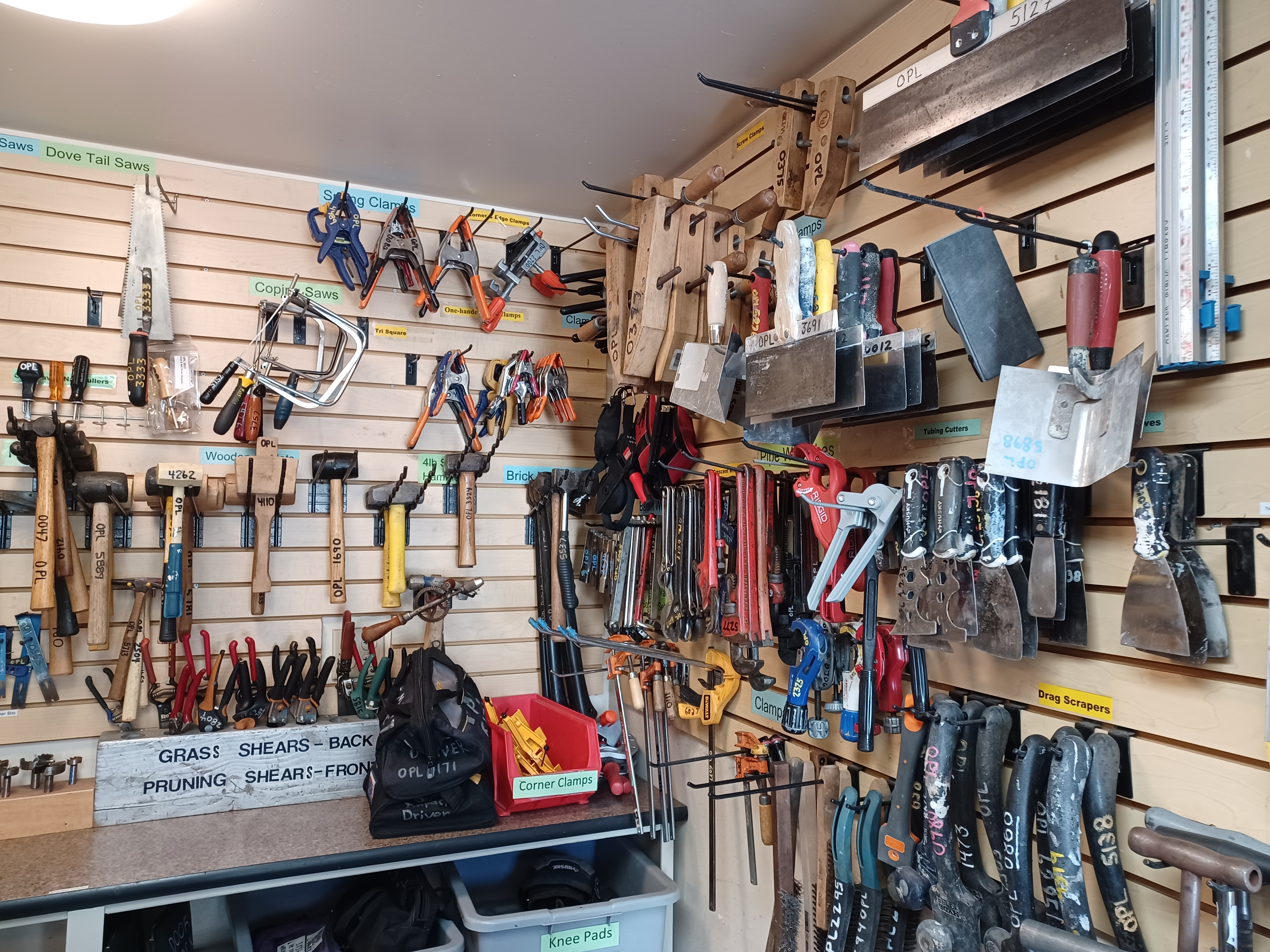
Tools at the Oakland Tool Lending Library

Temescal is home to one of the few tool-lending libraries in the Bay Area—indeed, in the U.S. (The Berkeley Public Library also has a tool-lending library at their nearby South Branch.) The Temescal branch of the Oakland Public Library operates this facility, which lends tools, free of charge, to library patrons for repairs and home-improvement projects. The Tool Lending Library also has instructional materials (books, videos, etc.) and gives "how-to" workshops.

== See also ==
- Temescal Street Cinema
- Bus rapid transit
- MacArthur (BART)
- Oakland Technical High School
- Oakland International High School
- Piedmont Avenue, Oakland, California
- Rockridge, Oakland, California
- Idora Park
- Lake Temescal
