= Medical Society of the State of New York =

The Medical Society of the State of New York (MSSNY, established 1807) is an organization of approximately 20,000 licensed physicians, medical residents, and medical students in the state of New York, United States. The society's journal, the New York State Journal of Medicine, was published from 1901 to 1993.
