= Longfellow Middle School =

Longfellow Middle School can refer to several schools in the United States:

- Henry Wadsworth Longfellow Middle School, Fairfax County, Virginia
- Longfellow Middle School (Norman, Oklahoma), Norman, Oklahoma
- Longfellow Middle School (San Antonio, Texas), San Antonio, Texas
- Longfellow Middle School (La Crosse, Wisconsin), La Crosse, Wisconsin
- Longfellow Middle School (Wauwatosa, Wisconsin), Wauwatosa, Wisconsin
- Longfellow Middle School (Berkeley, California), Berkeley, California
- Henry W. Longfellow Middle School (Indianapolis, Indiana), Indianapolis, Indiana
