= Santa Fe, Oakland, California =

Santa Fe District
- Neighborhood of Oakland
- Interactive map of Santa Fe District
- Coordinates: 37.842312°N 122.27359°W
- Country: United States
- State: California
- County: Alameda
- City: Oakland

Santa Fe is a small neighborhood in North Oakland, Oakland, California. This roughly triangular area is bounded by Temescal Creek (just south of 52nd Street) west of Martin Luther King Jr. Way to Lowell Street, north to 61st Street, east to Martin Luther King, Jr. Way and back to 52nd Street.
