= Peralta Elementary School (Oakland, California) =

Coordinates: 37°50′58″N 122°15′32″W

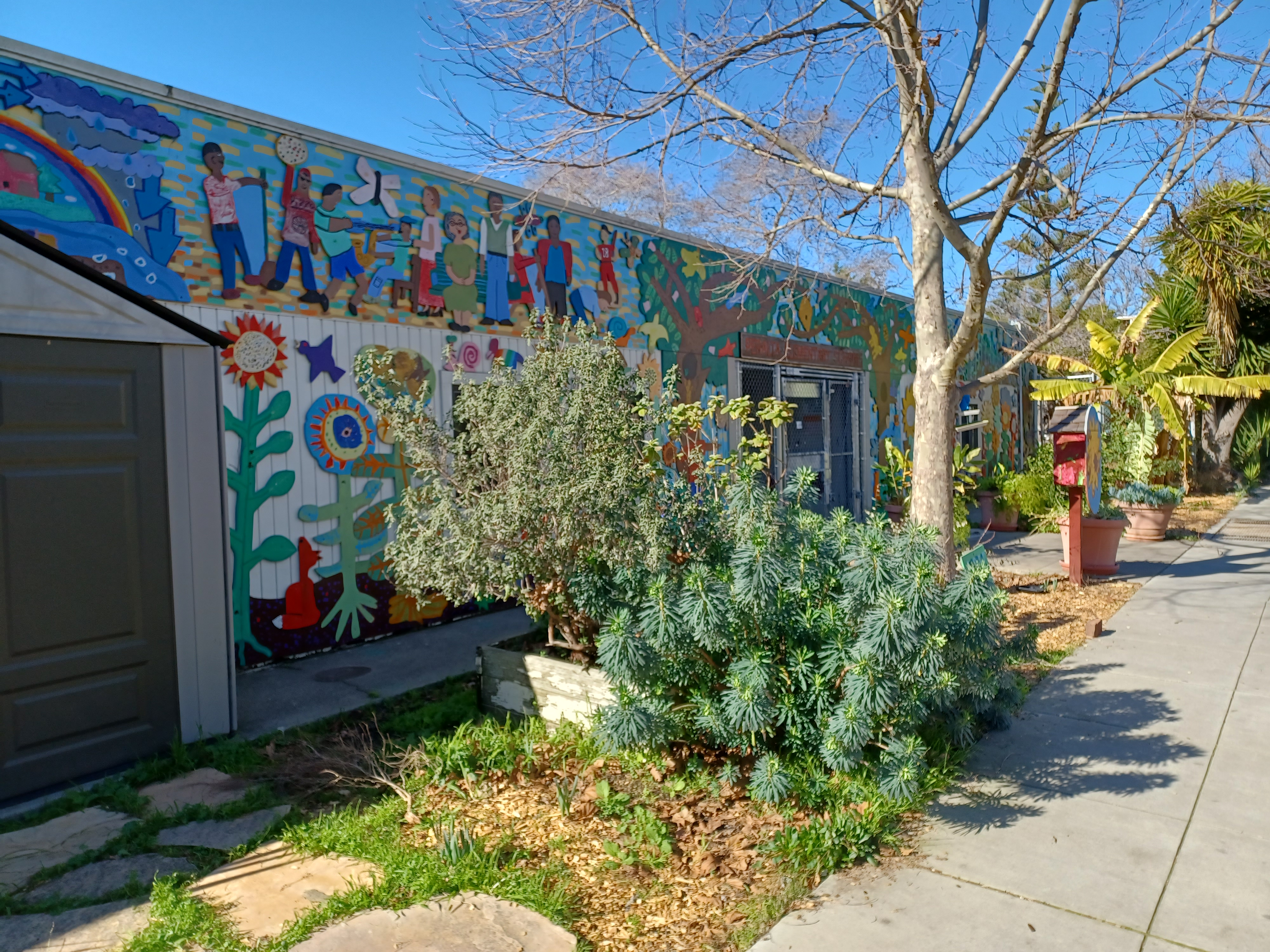

Information
- Established: 1880
- Grades: Transitional Kindergarten - 5th Grade
- Enrollment: 350

Peralta Elementary School is a designated arts anchor school in the Oakland Unified School District. It was established in 1880 as a one-room schoolhouse, and today has around 350 students in 14 classrooms (TK–5th).

In 2006, Peralta was one of six schools in California where African-American students scored an API that exceeded 800 on the state STAR test. In 2008, Peralta demonstrated that academic targets were achieved for all subgroups at the school.

Activities held at the school include community yardsales, walkathons and spring festival called Peralta in Bloom.
