= Rockridge, Oakland, California =

Neighborhood of Oakland in Alameda County, California, US

Rockridge
- Neighborhood of Oakland
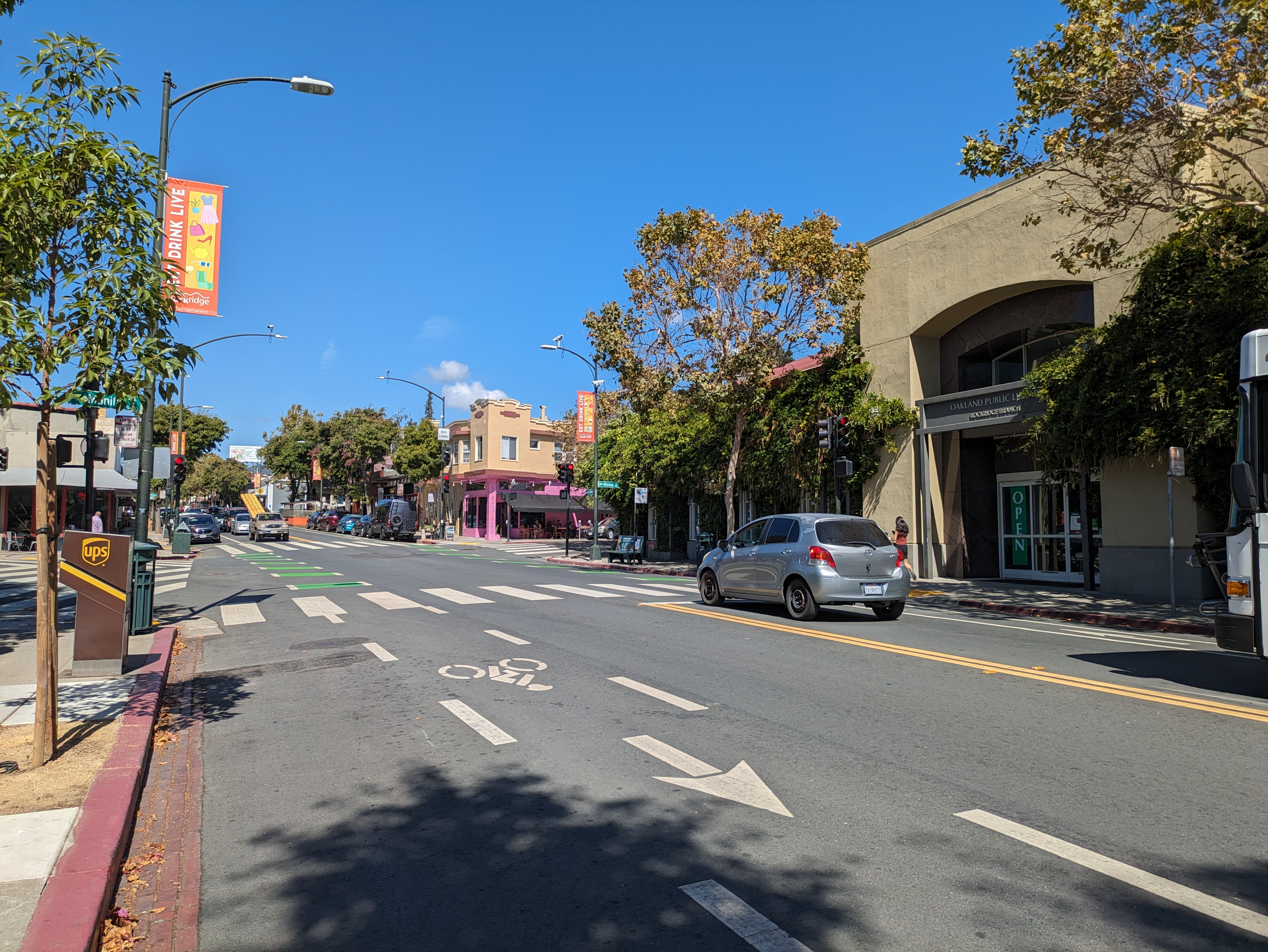
- College Ave in Rockridge

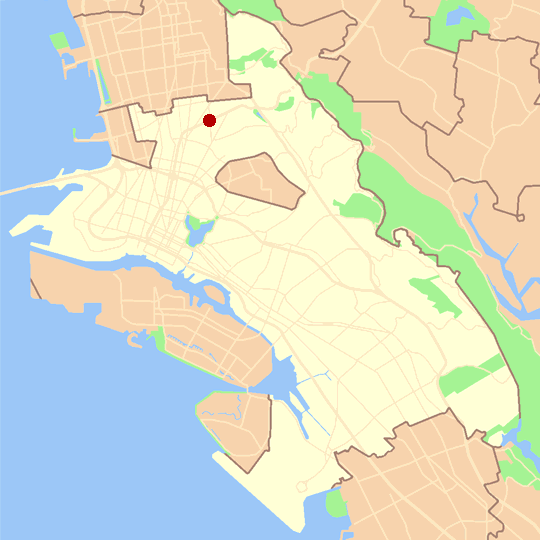
- Location of Rockridge in Oakland
- Coordinates: 37.842778°N 122.246111°W
- Country: United States
- State: California
- County: Alameda
- City: Oakland

Rockridge is a residential neighborhood and commercial district in Oakland, California. Rockridge is generally defined as the area east of Telegraph Avenue, south of the Berkeley city limits, west of the Oakland Hills and north of the intersection of Pleasant Valley Avenue/51st Street and Broadway. Rockridge was listed by Money Magazine in 2002 as one of the "best places to live".

It lies at an elevation of 187 feet (57 m). Some residential portions of the neighborhood consist mainly of relatively large homes built between the 1920s and the 1950s, although some homes date even earlier to 1909–1912. Other portions of the neighborhood consist of small bungalows and cottages. In other sections, multi-family apartment buildings add density which supports nearby transit and retail. It is also home to Claremont Country Club.

== History ==
Rockridge is named for the outcroppings of rock at the northern end of the long shutter ridge formed by the Hayward Fault which encloses the linear valley in which the Montclair district of Oakland is situated. An example of this rock can be seen at an abandoned quarry adjacent to the Rockridge Shopping Center on Pleasant Valley Road. This quarry was operated well into the 1950s and is now used as a reservoir for the Claremont Country Club. Prior to the construction of the shopping center in the late 1960s, the Broadway side of the shopping center had a used car lot.

Much of the buildout of Rockridge in the 1920s was powered by the desire of lower-middle-class white Protestants to avoid 'undesirable' racial groups, powered by racial covenants that prohibited ownership of property by certain ethnic groups. This is reflected in the current racial makeup of the area—it, unlike most of Oakland, is mostly white.

The main thoroughfare in the area other than College Avenue is now Pleasant Valley Avenue. Originally Pleasant Valley Avenue did not cross over the hill from Piedmont Avenue to Broadway – instead it terminated at Piedmont Avenue while continuing along a large portion of what is now known as Grand Avenue. The main link between Piedmont Avenue and Broadway was the – still existing – Mather Street that would turn into 42nd by Oakland Technical High School. A short, small, street called McAdam existed at what is now the current Pleasant Valley and 51st junction but ended at Gilbert Street. The expansion of McAdam into Pleasant Valley and continuation over the hill did not happen until the 1960s.

Like many neighborhoods, Rockridge has had its ups and downs. Before the completion of Highway 24 in 1964, Miles Avenue and several other streets were laid out differently. Residents living in the area at the time, once known as "Little Italy" because of a large number of Italian immigrants, saw the decline of the neighborhood's human scale into the 1970s due to the separation of the neighborhood caused by the SR-24 freeway. In the mid to late 1970s, some storefronts on College Avenue were boarded up. However, due to the success of a number of new businesses, which together formed a "critical mass" of commercial attraction, the Rockridge commercial district began to thrive again.

Until the 1950s, electric trolley trains ran along College Avenue on what is now AC Transit bus routes 51A and 51B. Additionally, as late as 1957, the railroad tracks of the Sacramento Northern Railway ran along Shafter Avenue, crossed College Ave. near where the Rockridge BART station is now and ran along the corridor of what is now state Highway 13 (the portion after Ashby Ave.), through Montclair Village and over into Contra Costa County. Film footage of this route has been broadcast over local PBS TV station KQED in a 1990s documentary on the development of the East Bay.

The Oakland firestorm of 1991 came within 1/2 mile of College Avenue, destroying a large part of the Upper Rockridge area east of Broadway. A memorial wall was created under the Rockridge BART station, located on College Avenue, following the fire.

== Commerce ==
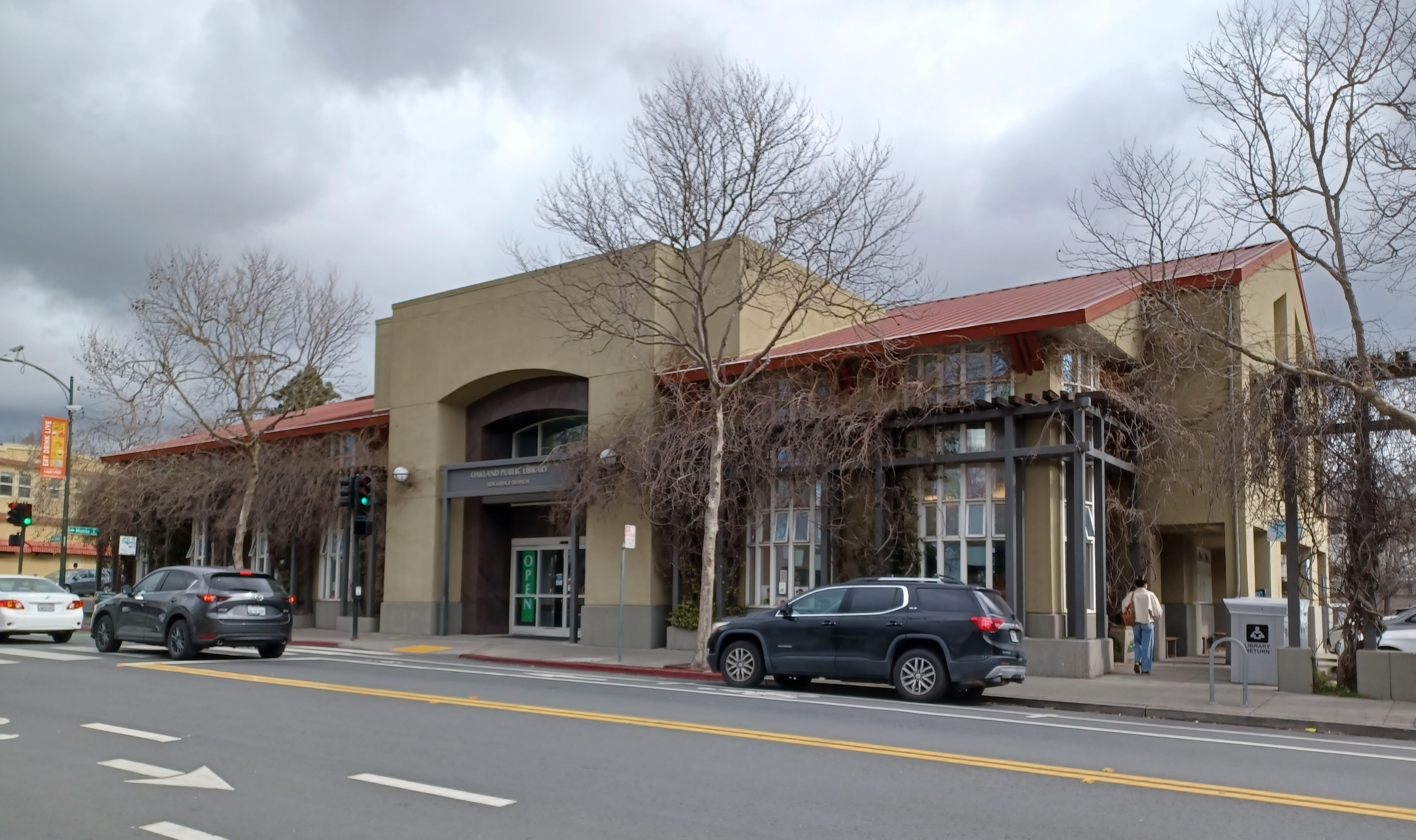
Rockridge branch of the Oakland Public Library

The main thoroughfare in Rockridge is College Avenue. The district is bounded by 51st Street on the southern end and Berkeley's Elmwood district on the northern end. The College Avenue strip running through Rockridge is home to more than 80 restaurants, cafes and upscale retail stores, including several bookstores specializing in used and rare books. Rockridge Market Hall, a collection of gourmet food establishments, is located there.

Dreyer's Ice Cream maintains its international corporate headquarters in Rockridge on College Avenue, and, until 2019, operated its only retail ice cream parlor on the premises.

The Rockridge Branch of the Oakland Public Library is one of the most visited establishments in the neighborhood and is home to an extensive collection of children's books and audio/visual materials.

Rockridge is often mentioned in tourist guidebooks on Oakland and the East Bay.

== Transportation ==
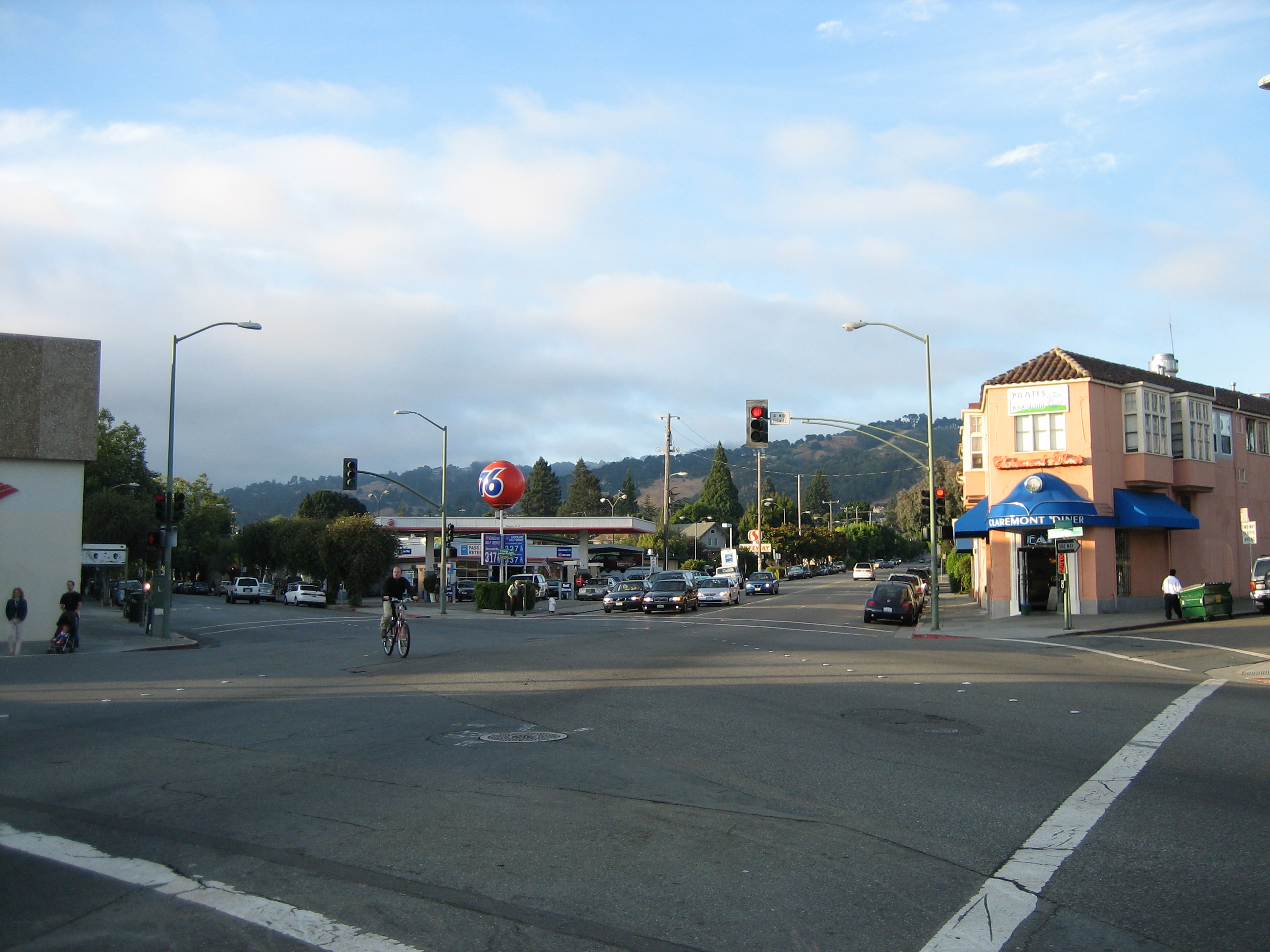
The intersection of College Avenue and Claremont near the northern end of Rockridge.

BART serves the neighborhood with the Rockridge Station. The area around the station provides transportation by train, bus, and casual carpool to all Bay Area airports, downtowns, and entertainment districts, while surrounded by open air markets, cafes, bars, shopping, and homes. The Rockridge BART station is located in the center of Rockridge, where College Avenue passes under the Grove Shafter Freeway (Highway 24). AC Transit bus lines 51A, 51B, and 79 serve the center of the neighborhood, while line E runs along Claremont Avenue and lines 6, 12, CB, and V run along its edges.

BART travel times from Rockridge to Montgomery Station near San Francisco's downtown financial district averages 22 minutes. Travel times to Downtown Oakland averages 8 minutes.

== Community character ==
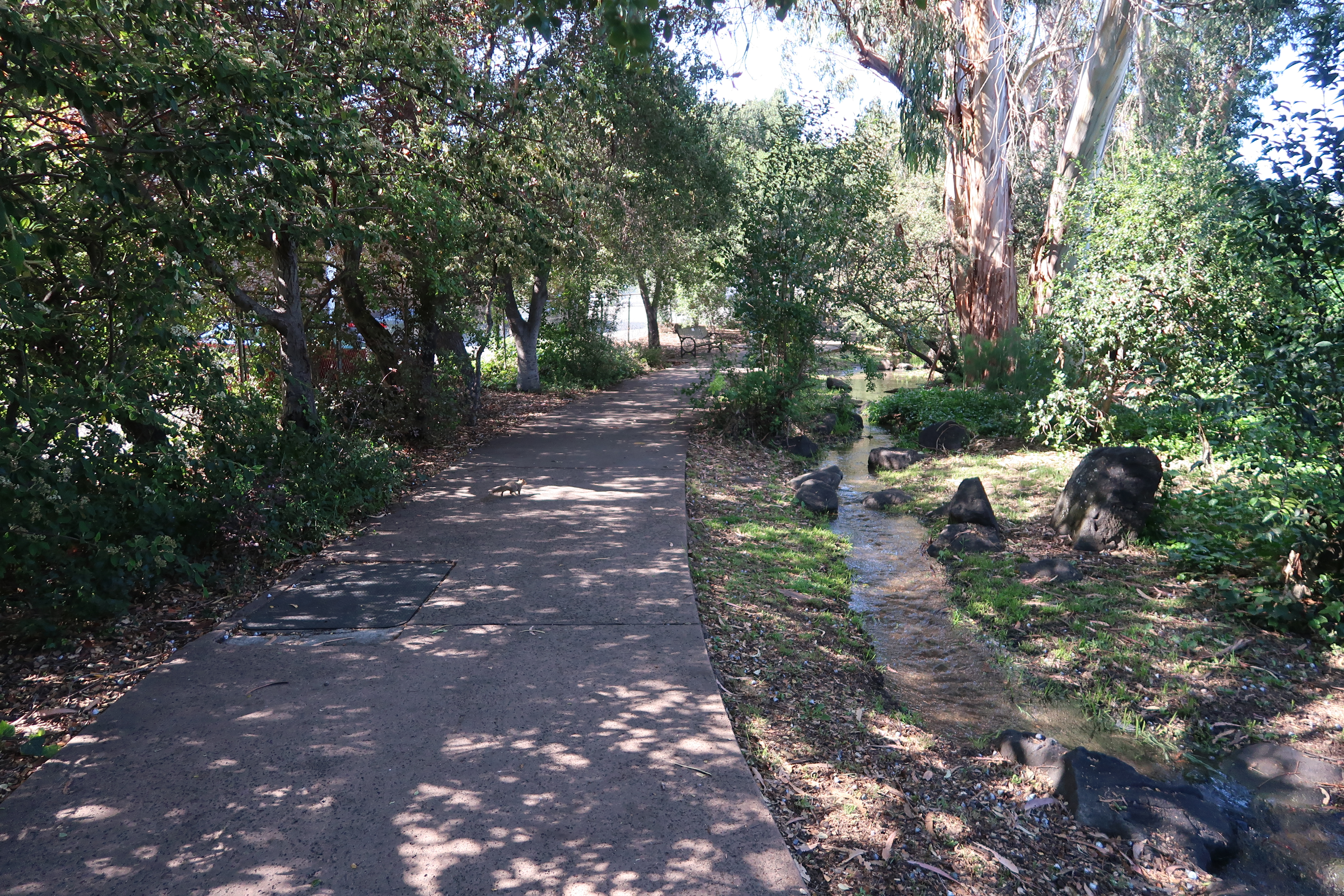
Rockridge-Temescal Greenbelt Park

Many Rockridge residents are involved in their neighborhood's political, educational and cultural life. Rockridge has several community organizations including the Rockridge District Association and the Rockridge Community Planning Council. The Rockridge News is published monthly and hand delivered to every resident's home.

Rockridge is home to the community-built Rockridge-Temescal Greenbelt Park, a linear park anchored at each end by two unique community-built play structures. It is commonly known as Frog Park, for the acronym of the organization which helped build the park, called FROG, the Friends of the Rockridge Temescal Greenbelt. FROG was organized in 2001 and raised more than $100,000 from the community to create the greenbelt park. It includes two play structures built entirely by volunteers, linked by a landscaped path which follows Temescal Creek, winding from Hudson Street to Redondo and Clarke. There are also basketball courts, a dog park, butterfly garden, public art by Mark Brest van Kempen, a Lily Pad Plaza, and a series of picnic tables and benches. The community group FROG is a project of the Rockridge Community Planning Council; a FROG steering committee organizes maintenance and community clean-up activities.

== Education ==
The Rockridge neighborhood is served by the Oakland Unified School District.

Chabot Elementary School in Rockridge, founded in 1927, serves grades kindergarten through 5th grade. Chabot consistently scores high in statewide assessments, and the Chabot PTA offers extensive after-school programs including language immersion classes and arts and music classes.

Peralta Elementary School in Rockridge, is a designated Arts Demonstration School in the Oakland Unified School District. Established in 1880 as a one-room schoolhouse, Peralta today has about 325 students in kindergarten through 5th grade.

Claremont Middle School (formerly Claremont Junior High School) has occupied its campus on College Avenue in the heart of Rockridge since 1913. The original building was demolished and rebuilt during the 1970s as part of a statewide program of retrofitting schools for earthquake safety. Claremont now serves more than 400 students in grades 6–8.

Rockridge students in grades 9 through 12 attend Oakland Technical High School.

An “alternative” public school, Far West High School, is a visual arts-focused campus for grades 7–12. It occupied the site of the former Rockridge Elementary School on Broadway Terrace, across the street from the California College of the Arts. The Oakland School Board made the decision in 1979 to close and demolish Rockridge Elementary School because of declining enrollment (less than 150 students) and fears for the earthquake safety of the original school building, a two-story structure built in 1923. The original auditorium was torn down in the 1950s, and the current one (still in use and doubling as the cafeteria) was constructed in 1959. It is now the upper campus to Oakland Technical High School.

Mentoring Academy is a private independent high school that offers individualized, self-paced, mentored instruction. Mentoring Academy, located at 5951 College Avenue, was founded by John Muster in 2012.

California College of the Arts was located at the intersection of College and Broadway from 1922 through 2022, when the Oakland campus was closed and merged into the San Francisco campus.

Professional education for Roman Catholic priests and friars is offered at St. Albert's College, a Dominican institution located on Birch Court near Claremont Middle School.

== See also ==
- A16
