= San Francisco Transbay Terminal =

Former transit terminal in San Francisco, CA, USA

Transbay Terminal
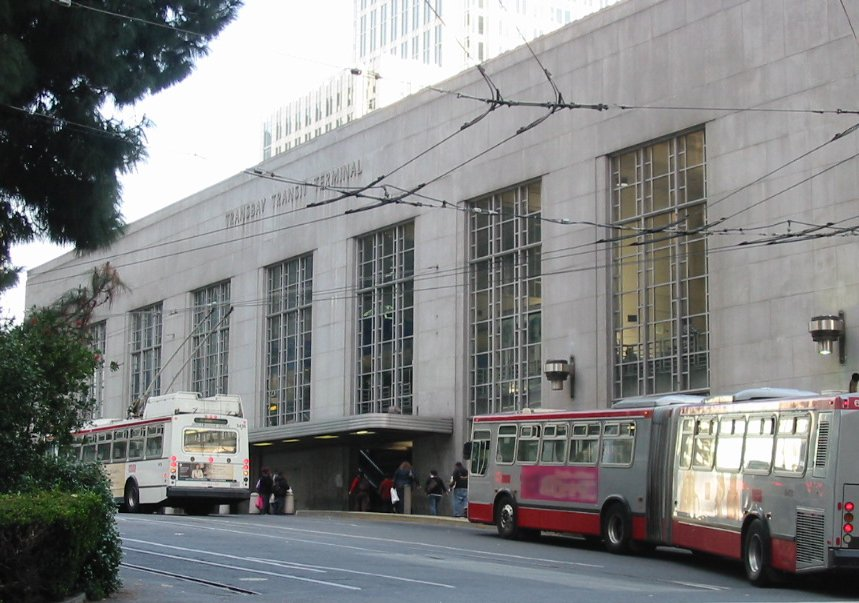
- The facade of the Transbay Terminal in 2008

General information
- Location: 425 Mission Street, San Francisco, California
- Coordinates: 37°47′22″N 122°23′47″W
- Owner: Caltrans

Other information
- Website: http://transbaycenter.org/project/terminal-history

History
- Opened: January 14, 1939
- Closed: August 7, 2010
Former services
Preceding station	Muni	Following station
1995–2000
Market and Battery toward 17th Street and Castro	F Market & Wharves	Terminus
1939–1982
Market and Battery toward Balboa Park	J Church	Terminus
Market and Battery toward Phelan Loop	K Ingleside	Terminus
Market and Battery toward SF Zoo	L Taraval	Terminus
Market and Battery toward Broad and Plymouth	M Ocean View	Terminus
Market and Battery toward Ocean Beach	N Judah	Terminus
Preceding station	Key System	Following station
1939–1958
Terminus	A	Yerba Buena Island toward Oak & 12th
Terminus	B	Yerba Buena Island toward Underhill
Terminus	C	Yerba Buena Island toward Oakland Avenue
Terminus	E	Yerba Buena Island toward Claremont
Terminus	F	Yerba Buena Island toward Solano & The Alameda
Terminus	H (discontinued 1941)	Hollis toward Monterey & Colusa
Preceding station	Sacramento Northern Railway	Following station
1939–1941
Terminus	Main Line	Oakland toward Chico
Preceding station	Southern Pacific Railroad	Following station
Interurban Electric Railway
1939–1941
Terminus	Berkeley Branch	34th Street toward Thousand Oaks
Terminus	Ninth Street Line	34th Street toward Thousand Oaks
Terminus	7th Street Line	Oakland toward San Leandro–Dutton Avenue
Terminus	Lincoln Avenue Line	Oakland toward West Alameda
Terminus	Encinal Avenue Line	Oakland toward West Alameda
Location

The San Francisco Transbay Terminal was a transportation complex in San Francisco, California, United States, roughly in the center of the rectangle bounded north–south by Minna Street and Natoma Street, and east–west by Beale Street and 2nd Street in the South of Market area of the city. It opened on January 14, 1939 as a train station and was converted into a bus depot in 1959. The terminal mainly served San Francisco's downtown and Financial District, as transportation from surrounding communities of the Bay Area terminated there such as: Golden Gate Transit buses from Marin County, AC Transit buses from the East Bay, and SamTrans buses from San Mateo County. Long-distance buses from beyond the Bay Area such as Greyhound and Amtrak Thruway also served the terminal. Several bus lines of the San Francisco Municipal Railway connected with the terminal.

It closed on August 7, 2010, to make way for the construction of the replacement facility, the Salesforce Transit Center, and associated towers. All long-distance and transbay bus operations were transferred to a Temporary Transbay Terminal at the nearby block bounded by Main, Folsom, Beale, and Howard Streets.

The new Salesforce Transit Center broke ground on August 11, 2010. US Secretary of Transportation Ray LaHood, US Speaker of the House Nancy Pelosi, and the Mayor of San Francisco Gavin Newsom attended the ceremony. The new transit center opened to the public on August 12, 2018.

== Bridge railway ==
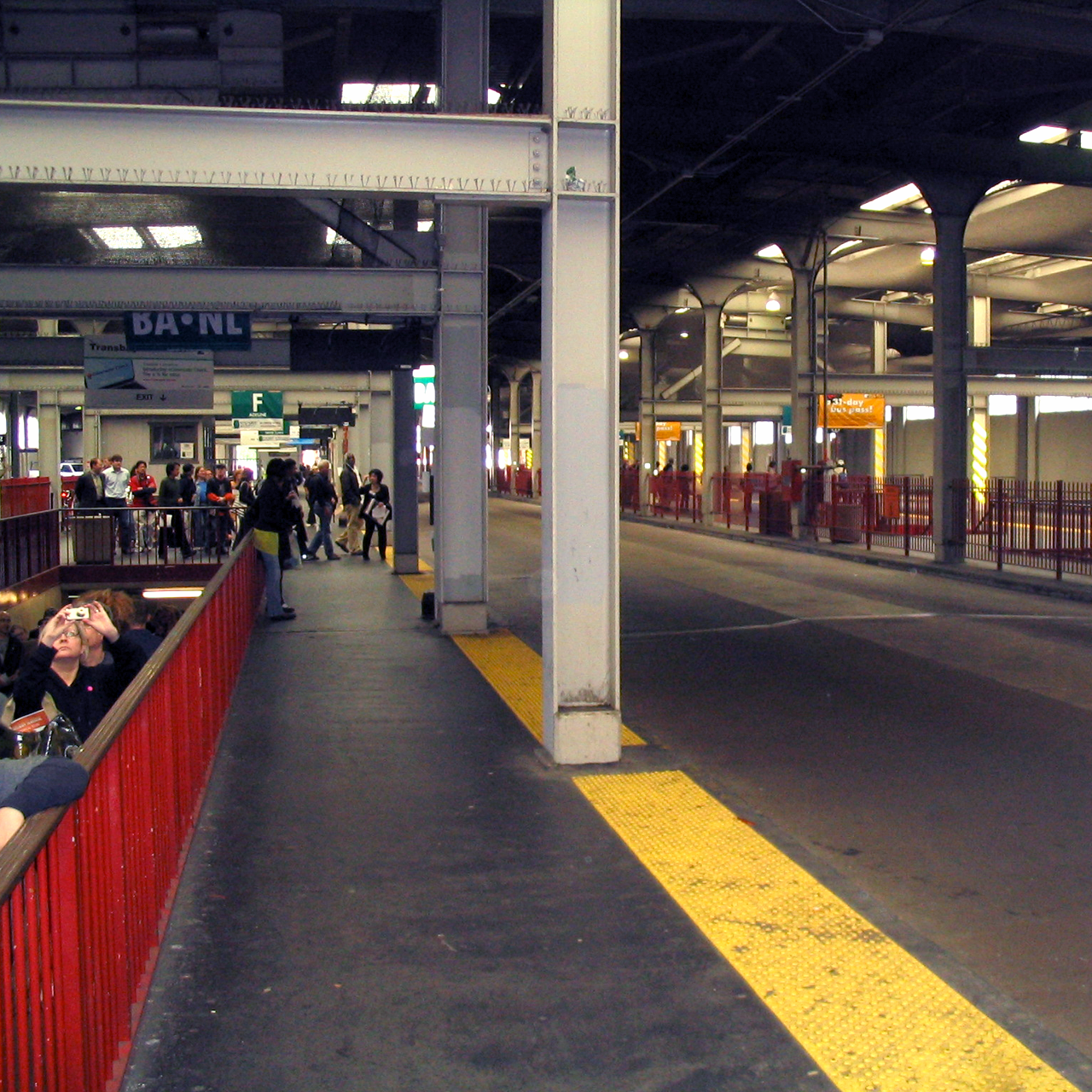
The bus deck in 2010, formerly the track level of the train station

The Transbay Terminal served as the San Francisco terminus for the electric commuter trains of the Interurban Electric (Southern Pacific), the Key System and the Sacramento Northern (Western Pacific) railroads, which ran on the south side of the lower deck of the Bay Bridge. Bus services such as Greyhound and local Muni streetcar lines had stops at the main entrance.

=== History ===
The Terminal was designed by Timothy L. Pflueger, Arthur Brown Jr., and John Donovan in the Art Moderne style. Bids were taken for construction of the terminal in June 1937, excavation began on July 29, 1937, and the first steel was erected on January 12, 1938. Structural concrete was complete by May 1938. The San Francisco-Oakland Bay Bridge Electric Railway Terminal Building was formally dedicated on 14 January 1939. State Director of Public Works Frank W. Clark turned the facilities over to the State of California, as represented by Lieutenant Governor Ellis E. Patterson, who turned over management of the facility to the three electric railroad companies. State officials and guests rode electric trains to the opening ceremony.

Construction of rail facilities (including laying tracks on the bridge and construction of the new San Francisco terminal) for the Bay Bridge had cost the state an estimated US$15,000,000 (equivalent to $347,200,000 in 2025), and the state had invested an additional US$3,666,129 (equivalent to $84,900,000 in 2025) in rolling stock, which was leased to the railroad companies. The terminal cost was estimated at US$2,300,000 (equivalent to $53,200,000 in 2025), and it was expected to serve upwards of 60,000 passengers per day.

=== Train service ===
Governor Frank Merriam piloted the first (ceremonial) electric train across the bridge on September 23, 1938, although regular service did not commence until January 1939, after the terminal was complete. Trains were controlled with a custom electric switchboard, which was considerably simpler than the typical mechanical lever system then in use. A loop was built so trains could turn around and go back across the bridge. Even after rail service ended, the loop continued to be used by AC Transit, Amtrak Thruway and Greyhound buses until the station closed. Surprisingly, a track was never made to connect to the Southern Pacific's Third and Townsend Depot so trains could go further south. There were six tracks. Beginning on January 15, 1939, half of all Market Street Railway trains were rerouted to a loop in front of the building; all services were eventually rerouted here in 1941.

By November 1940, the Interurban Electric Company was seeking permission to abandon East Bay service, prompting Director Clark to consider proposals for the state to assume operation of trains across the bridge. The SP and Sacramento Northern trains ceased service across the Bay in 1941 only two years after the Terminal was completed. Interurban stated they were forced to discontinue service, citing falling passenger counts, revenues, and a failed proposed consolidation with the Key System. After Interurban was granted permission to discontinue service, Sacramento Northern also applied to discontinue service in 1941. Sacramento Northern carried only a minuscule fraction (less than 1%) of the total rail traffic over the Bay Bridge, which meant Sacramento Northern likely also operated at a loss. Trains carried 37.334 million passengers across the Bay Bridge at peak ridership in 1945, driven in part by gasoline rationing, but ridership declined precipitously, managing to move only 6.113 million passengers in 1957. The Key System successfully petitioned the Public Utilities Commission to discontinue service across the Bay Bridge in 1955 due to falling revenues, after failing to discontinue service in an unsuccessful 1953 petition. The Oakland City Planning Commission reported that since 1945, all the petitions from the Key System had invariably asked for cuts to service and increased fares, which also contributed to declining ridership. The last train crossed the bridge on April 20, 1958, less than twenty years after service was inaugurated in 1939, despite the vital role the trains played. There have been several attempts to restore rail service across the bridge (though not necessarily into the Transbay Terminal), but none have been successful.

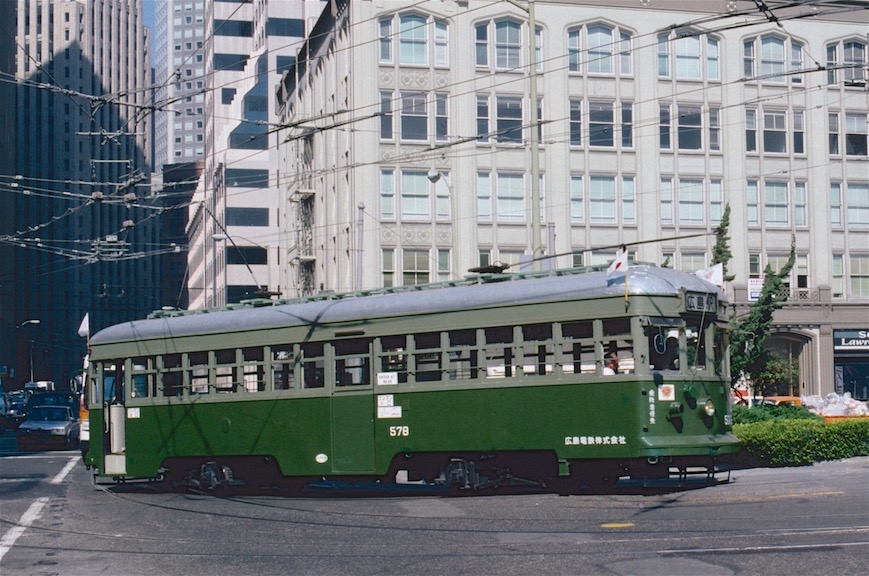
During the 1987 San Francisco Historic Trolley Festival, streetcar 578, formerly of Kobe, Japan, turns into the Transbay Terminal loop in scheduled service on the F-Market line.

=== Rebuilt for bus service ===
During the next year, the Transbay Terminal was rebuilt into a bus depot. The tracks were removed and replaced with pavement for use primarily by the buses of the publicly owned successor of the Key System, AC Transit. All lines were operating from the rebuilt terminal by July 12, 1959, and Greyhound service was added on February 1, 1960. In 1971 Amtrak started running buses into the Transbay Terminal from the Southern Pacific's 16th Street Station. Bus service thrived until late 1974, when BART's Transbay Tube opened. Many people preferred BART over AC Transit. The tube didn't run through the terminal, resulting in its decline. Homeless people noticed the decline in the number of commuters and took the chance to inhabit the terminal building.

After formation of the Muni Metro, streetcars were replaced with light rail vehicles and rerouted through the upper level of the Market Street subway. Rail service to the station was briefly revived by the F Market line, at first during historic streetcar festivals, but for full service by 1995. The line's extension to Fisherman's Wharf in March 2000 saw the end of rail traffic to the terminal. The last F-line trip departed from the Transbay Terminal at 12:55 a.m. on the night of March 3, and the track was abandoned in August 2000, the final use being a "farewell" trip by 1916-built work car C1 on August 18, with work on removal of the track on Fremont Street beginning soon afterwards.

The Transbay Terminal hosted a cocktail lounge, a diner, a newsstand, and a state police office until the 1990s, when the tenants were either evicted or unable to meet safety regulations. Because the Terminal straddled First and Fremont streets, the large overpass structures and lobby spaces unofficially served to shelter numerous homeless people. Even after demolition commenced, several Transbay Terminal residents refused to move, preferring instead to sleep next to demolition debris.

== Demolition and replacement ==
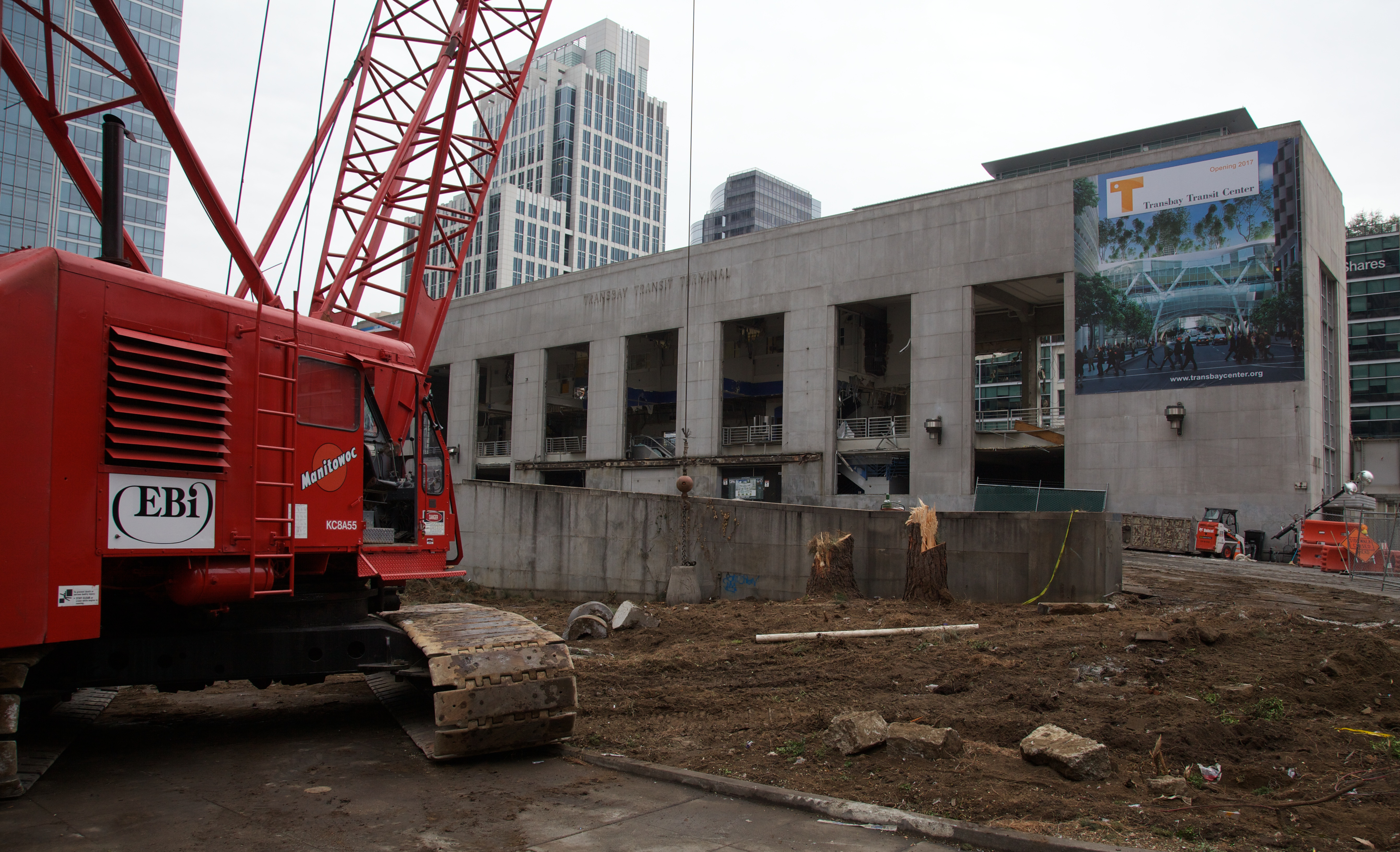
Transbay Terminal facade in December 2010, with crane-mounted wrecking ball in foreground

The City and County of San Francisco, the Alameda – Contra Costa Transit District (AC Transit), and the Peninsula Corridor Joint Powers Board (Caltrain) proposed to replace the underused original Transbay Terminal with an entirely new and more functional building at roughly the same location. The final Environmental Impact Report (EIR) was published in 2004, and construction began in August 2010 on Phase 1, the new Transbay Transit Center (TTC) building. A new outdoor temporary terminal was opened nearby to serve commuters during construction of the new transit center.

The last bus departed the Transbay Terminal early on August 7, 2010, just after ownership of the building was transferred from Caltrans to TJPA. Demolition by wrecking ball commenced in December 2010, and demolition was declared complete on September 7, 2011.

It was announced in March 2011 that a sculpture to be assembled from Transbay Terminal debris by Tim Hawkinson would be erected on the corner of Mission and Fremont Streets after completion of the new Transbay Transit Center. However, the sculpture project was cancelled on June 7, 2017 due to cost and engineering concerns.

=== Temporary Transbay Terminal ===
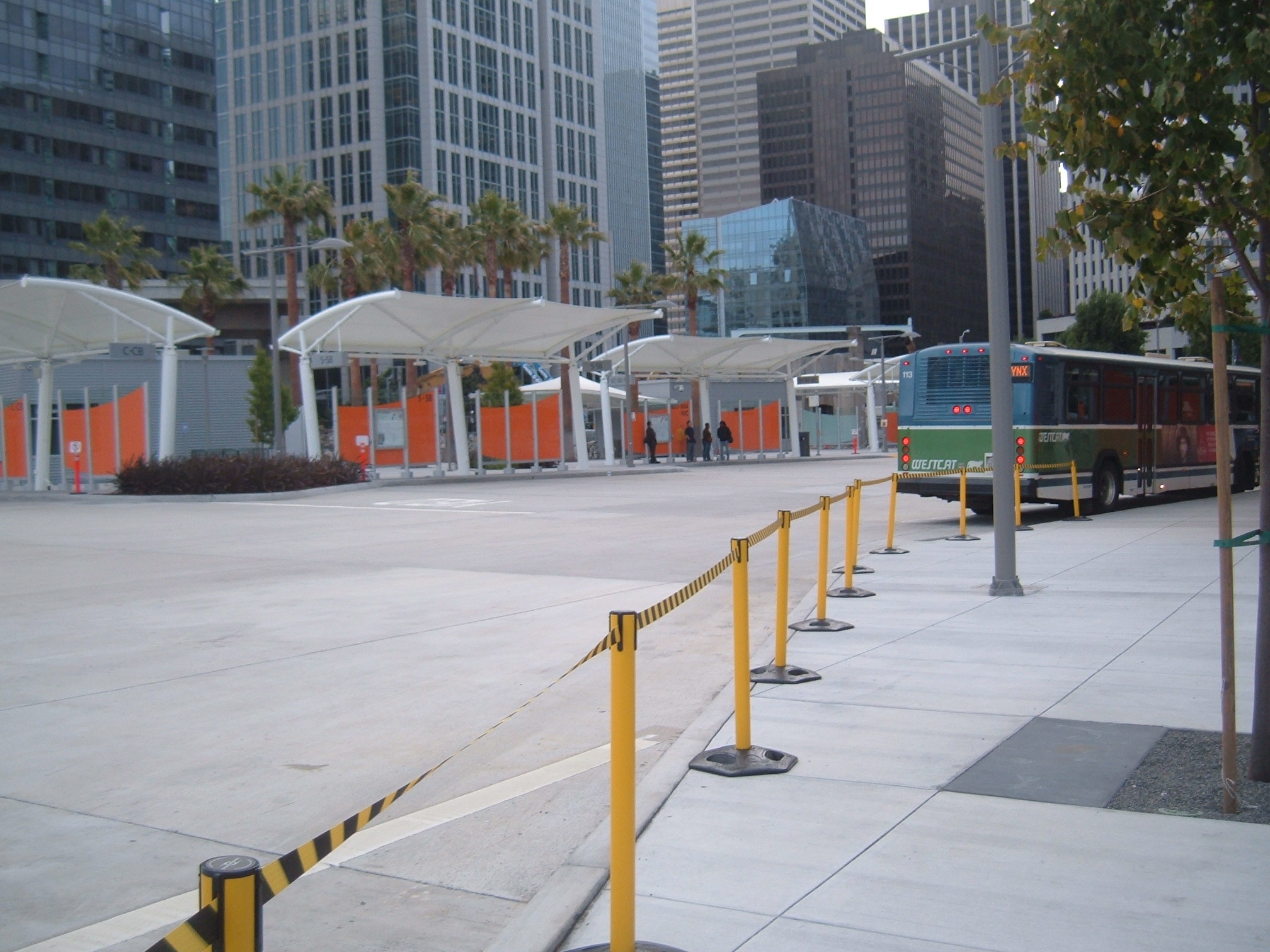
The Temporary Transbay Terminal

The Temporary Transbay Terminal was the San Francisco terminus for Transbay and regional buses for most of the 2010s. It was in operation from August 2010 through August 2018, when the new Salesforce Transit Center opened, and again from September 2018 to August 2019 during a temporary closure of the new center. It occupied the city block bounded by Howard, Main, Folsom, and Beale Streets.

==== Closure & reopening ====
The Temporary Transbay Terminal initially ceased operations on August 12, 2018, with the opening of the new Salesforce Transit Center, only to be reopened weeks later, on September 25, 2018, following the discovery of support beam cracks at the Salesforce Transit Center. By December 5, 2018, Clipper card kiosks were reinstalled at the temporary terminal due to the continued closure of the Transit Center. In April 2019, repairs were finished and it was determined that the cause of the cracking was partly caused when crews welding the beams together skipped a crucial step in the process required by the building code that led to tiny, micro-cracks forming. Multiple inspections failed to notice the skipped step, and those micro-cracks grew into larger ones. After a thorough set of repairs and reviews, the transit center reopened to the public on August 11, 2019, nearly one year after its closure.

==== Future development ====
In 2018, real estate developers submitted proposals to demolish the Temporary Terminal and replace it with affordable housing and a park, but with the permanent transit center still closed for repairs at that time, the future of that proposed project was not known.
