= Northbrae Tunnel =

Road tunnel in Berkeley, California, US

Coordinates: 37.8903°N 122.2728°W

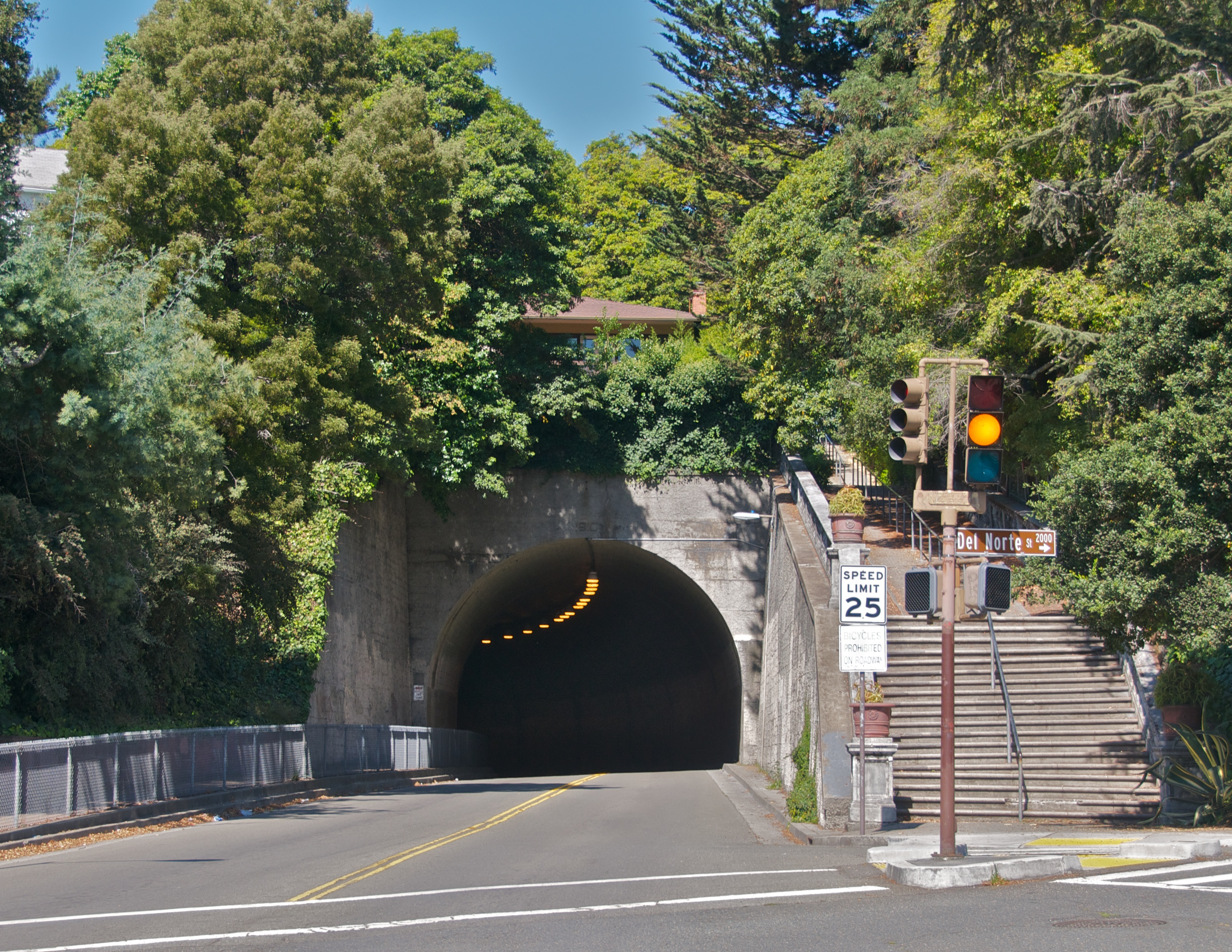

Overview
- Location: Berkeley / Alameda County, California, US
- Route: East Bay Electric Lines (1912–41); Key System (1941–58); Solano Avenue (1962–present)
- Crosses: Marin and Los Angeles Avenues

Operation
- Constructed: cut-and-cover
- Opened: Railroad: 1912; Street: 1962
- Closed: Railroad: April 20, 1958

Technical
- Length: 465 feet (142 m)
- No. of tracks: 2 tracks until 1958
- No. of lanes: 2 lanes, Solano Avenue since 1962
- Track gauge: 4 ft 8 1/2 in (1,435 mm) standard gauge
- Electrified: EBEL, 1200 V DC overhead KS, 600 V DC overhead, in 1941

The Northbrae Tunnel, also referred to as the Solano Avenue Tunnel, was built as a commuter electric railroad tunnel in the northern part of Berkeley, California, and was later converted to street use.

In 1910 the Southern Pacific Railroad (SP) was electrifying its steam-engine drawn ferry-train line (to San Francisco) from Oakland Pier via Shattuck Avenue to Vine Street in Berkeley and extending it north along the base of the Berkeley Hills to newly developing neighborhoods of Berkeley at Northbrae and Thousand Oaks. The route chosen was Henry Street and Sutter Street to its intersection with Hopkins. At this point a ridge carrying Marin and Los Angeles Avenues blocked the way. After investigating (1) a route around the ridge and (2) a cut through the ridge with bridges over it, it was decided to use the route of the cut but make it a tunnel instead, under Marin and Los Angeles Avenues just west of their intersection with The (Marin) Circle. The cut-and-cover method of tunnel construction was used. The tunnel curved to the west so that the railroad could continue through to the intersection of Solano Avenue and The Alameda and then to Thousand Oaks station at Solano and Colusa Avenues.

The line also required a level grade across the lower canyon of Codornices Creek. To accomplish this, a temporary wooden trestle was built along Henry Street with tracks for the construction trains which was subsequently filled in with material excavated from the tunnel cut. A steel bridge was emplaced at Eunice Street. allowing auto traffic to pass under the tracks. This bridge was removed in 1959-60 after the Key System ended its commuter train service.

The railroad was completed in 1911 and inspection trains were run at the end of that year, with service beginning January 1, 1912.

The SP ferry-train service was changed to bridge-train service operated by its subsidiary, Interurban Electric Railway (IER) across the San Francisco Oakland Bay Bridge in December, 1939. The IER ended service July 26, 1941, but the tracks in Berkeley were made available to the Key System, which extended service to Hopkins and Sutter Streets (the stop formerly called Northbrae) beginning August 6, 1941. Service was extended through the tunnel to a new terminal at Solano Avenue and The Alameda on December 6, 1942. This served as the outbound terminus of the F Line. All bridge-train service ended on April 20, 1958.

A paved roadway was installed in the tunnel by the City of Berkeley, and was opened to traffic on December 15, 1962, extending Solano Avenue through the tunnel to connect with Sutter Street.

== See also ==
- List of tunnels in the United States
