= East Bay Electric Lines =

Former local railway services in the San Francisco Bay Area

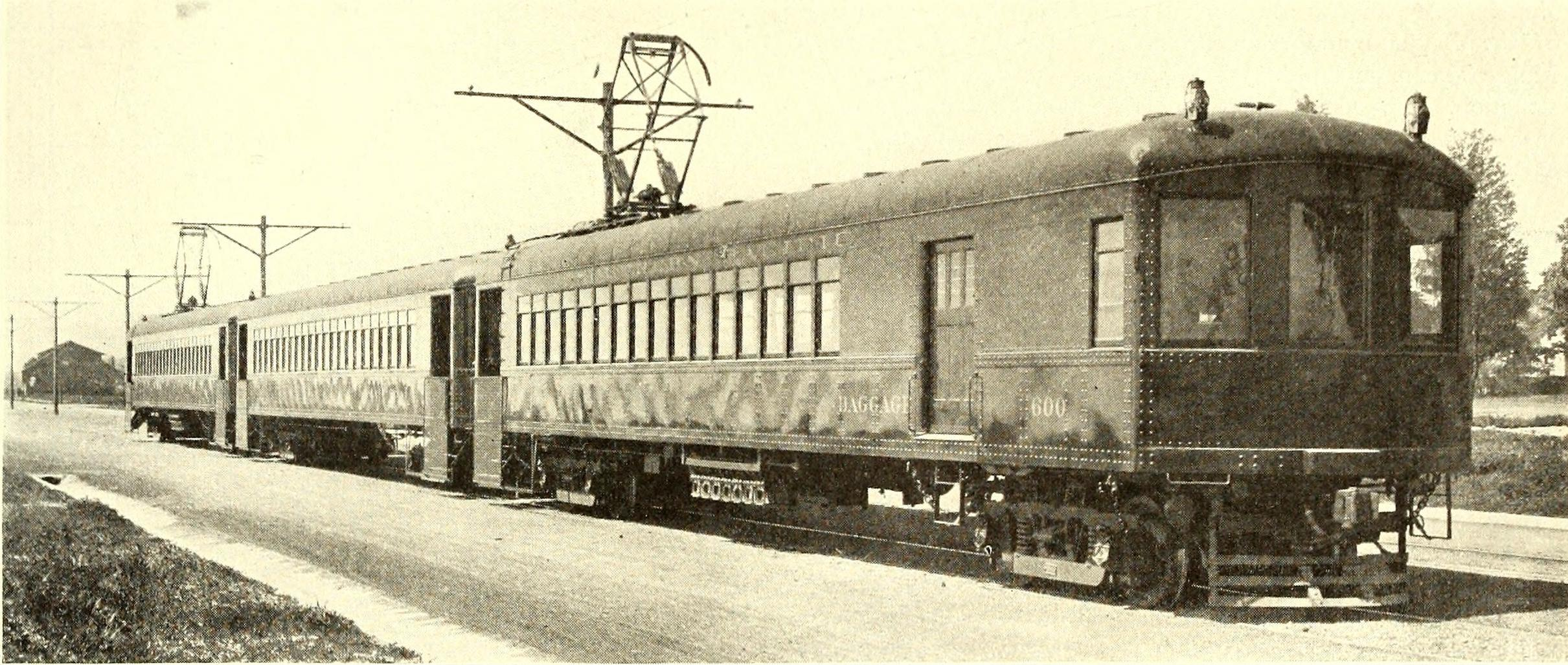
- An East Bay Electric Lines train, 1911

Overview
- Owner: Southern Pacific Railroad

Operation
- Began operation: June 1, 1911
- Ended operation: July 26, 1941

Technical
- Track gauge: 4 ft 8 1/2 in (1,435 mm) standard gauge
- Electrification: Overhead line, 1,200 V DC

The East Bay Electric Lines were a unit of the Southern Pacific Railroad that operated electric interurban-type trains in the East Bay region of the San Francisco Bay Area. Beginning in 1862, the SP and its predecessors (Note: See under Lines.) operated local steam-drawn ferry-train passenger service in the East Bay on an expanding system of lines, but in 1902 the Key System started a competing system of electric lines and ferries. The SP then drew up plans to expand and electrify its system of lines and this new service began in 1911. The trains served the cities of Berkeley, Albany, Emeryville, Oakland, Alameda, and San Leandro transporting commuters to and from the large Oakland Pier (the "mole") and SP Alameda Pier. A fleet of ferry boats ran between these piers and the docks of the Ferry Building on the San Francisco Embarcadero.

The East Bay Electric Lines became the Interurban Electric Railway (IER) in anticipation of the opening of the Bay Bridge Railway in January 1939. This railway consisted of two tracks on the southern side of the lower deck of the San Francisco–Oakland Bay Bridge, running from the East Bay to the San Francisco Transbay Terminal. SP IER transbay commuter train service ended in July 1941.

== History ==
=== Before electrification (1863–1911) ===
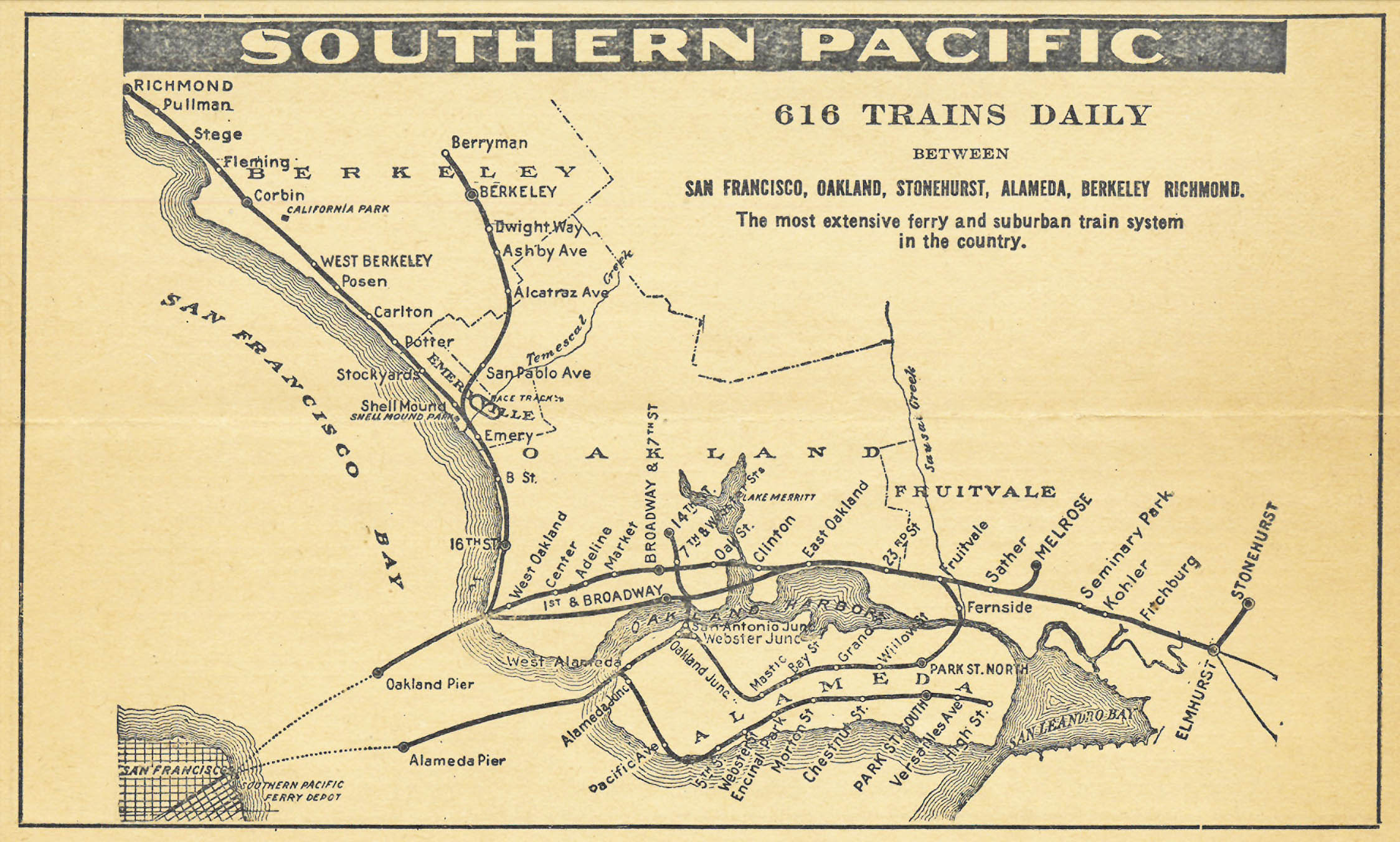
1911 map of pre-electrification local Southern Pacific services in the East Bay.

Prior to the formation of the East Bay Electric Lines (and later Interurban Electric Railway), commuter services by the Southern Pacific Railroad and predecessor Central Pacific Railroad were run entirely by steam traction. The first railroad to operate suburban services in the East Bay was the San Francisco & Alameda Railroad, which was formed on March 25, 1863.

Through a series of mergers with the San Francisco, Alameda, & Stockton Railroad Company and the prior San Francisco & Alameda Railroad, the San Francisco, Oakland, & Alameda Railroad (SFO&A) was formed in June 1871. The SFO&A would be absorbed by the Central Pacific Railroad in August. With the merger with the Central Pacific, trains would terminate at the Oakland Mole (a long ferry pier into the San Francisco Bay), starting in January 1882. Suburban commuter services by the Central Pacific would be operated in the same manner after Southern Pacific took over.

In 1902 the San Francisco, Oakland, & San Jose Railway (SFO&SJ) would build a three-and-a-quarter-mile-long (5.2 km) pier from Emeryville into the San Francisco Bay. The "Key System Mole" as referred to by patrons would rival the Southern Pacific's Oakland Mole for speed and general service. The SFO&SJ interurban line was faster, quicker, cleaner, and quieter than the Southern Pacific's steam operations, which paled in comparison. Between 1902 and 1911, the appeal of the SFO&SJ, and later companies San Francisco, Oakland, & San Jose Consolidated Railway and Key System, would rival the Southern Pacific's steam operated commuter operations. After management changed hands in the Southern Pacific between Collis P. Huntington and Edward H. Harriman, the decline of revenue by the rivalry would force the Southern Pacific to electrify their lines in competition in 1911.

=== Electrification to reorganization (1911–1934) ===
In 1911 Southern Pacific embarked on a task to double track and electrify its commuter lines. When the construction of catenary over the new lines was complete, Southern Pacific received a new fleet of 72-foot-long (22 m) steel interurbans from the American Car & Foundry Company in the later months of 1911. Electric service commenced on June 1, 1911 along the length of the Encinal Avenue Line to the Alameda Mole. For the first weeks, electric trains were relegated to midday service with steam trains taking over during rush-hours. When the electrification of the lines was completed, a passenger could board an East Bay Electric Lines interurban from either the Oakland or Alameda Moles, and travel to Dutton Avenue, Thousand Oaks, Albany, Berkeley, and Downtown Oakland. Long term plans called for extensions to Richmond and San Jose (to presumably link up with Southern Pacific's other interurban subsidiary, the Peninsular Railway), which never materialized. The company invested $10 million (Note: $334 million in 2025 adjusted for inflation) between 1909 and 1912 upgrading the East Bay lines, though the increase in passengers failed to offset the expenditure.

In addition to interurban service, streetcar service began in 1912 through various sections of the cities it served. A series of smaller streetcars by the Pullman Car Company also served these lines until 1930. Between 1912 and 1930 there was little change to the services of the East Bay Electric Lines. Southern Pacific's efforts in the 1920s to relax work rules and increase fares failed. As a result, the company sought to merge East Bay Electric Lines with the rival Key System. Employee backlash halted these plans.

In 1930, all streetcar services ceased in Oakland and Berkeley as they had failed to turn a profit. An internal report by Southern Pacific management in 1933 recommended total abandonment of East Bay electric services. Due to the widespread adoption of the automobile, the Great Depression, and high labor costs, the IER was rapidly losing both money and patronage, so a franchise was granted to them for operation on the lower deck of the San Francisco Bay Bridge to the new Transbay Terminal, in order to entice new patrons. On November 14, 1934, the East Bay Electric Lines reorganized as the Interurban Electric Railway (IER).

=== Bay Bridge operation to abandonment (1934–1941) ===
From the reorganization of the East Bay Electric Lines into the Interurban Electric Railway in 1934, the new IER had already begun plans to reroute service and maintenance facilities well before the Bay Bridge had been completed. The location of the approach to the Bay Bridge was located directly next to the Key System's trackage that led to the Key System Mole. So, the Interurban Electric Railway began construction of a trestle over the Southern Pacific and Atchison, Topeka, & Santa Fe Railroad tracks in order to access this new area. Additionally, it was agreed that the IER and Key System should share a maintenance facility in the new Bridge Yard, so work began on a new facility and yard storage area for the two lines.

When completed, the new Bridge Yard would replace existing Key System tracks with a joint Sacramento Northern, Interurban Electric Railway, and Key System maintenance yard. Extra trains for Bay Bridge usage could also be stored here, but this practice was not used by the Sacramento Northern Railroad who preferred to utilize an existing yard.

The Interurban Electric Railway's new route also featured a fly-over bridge over Key System tracks. From the Bridge Yard to the new Transbay Terminal, the three interurban lines would share two tracks. This required an extensive signaling system, so all trains were retrofitted with special signaling devices that warned of speed limit and the automatic block signaling. Electrification on the bridge would be at 1200 volts for the Sacramento Northern and Interurban Electric Railway, so all trains were also retrofitted to run on this voltage.

Beginning January 1938, IER trains could now run across the Bay Bridge. Routes now terminated at the Transbay Terminal, but with a central stop at the 26th Street Station for transferring, instead of the usual Oakland and Alameda Moles. With the new addition of interurban service to San Francisco, patrons from Berkeley, Oakland, Alameda, and upper San Leandro could now ride into San Francisco. Alameda passengers, however, were disappointed with their arrangement with bridge operations; cars would have to run a large U-shaped route out to Fruitvale before running to the bridge on the 7th Street line. The IER saw a brief increase of patronage, but due to automobile competition and the fact that cars had been allowed to use the Bay Bridge since 1936, the IER could not compete. Between 1938 and 1940 the IER reduced services drastically in order to try and stay afloat, but could not.

On February 26, 1940, the IER applied to the Public Utilities Commission to abandon services. Interurban commuter services were no longer making money. On July 26, 1941, the Interurban Electric Railway ran its last interurban, and was shut down the following day.

== Lines ==
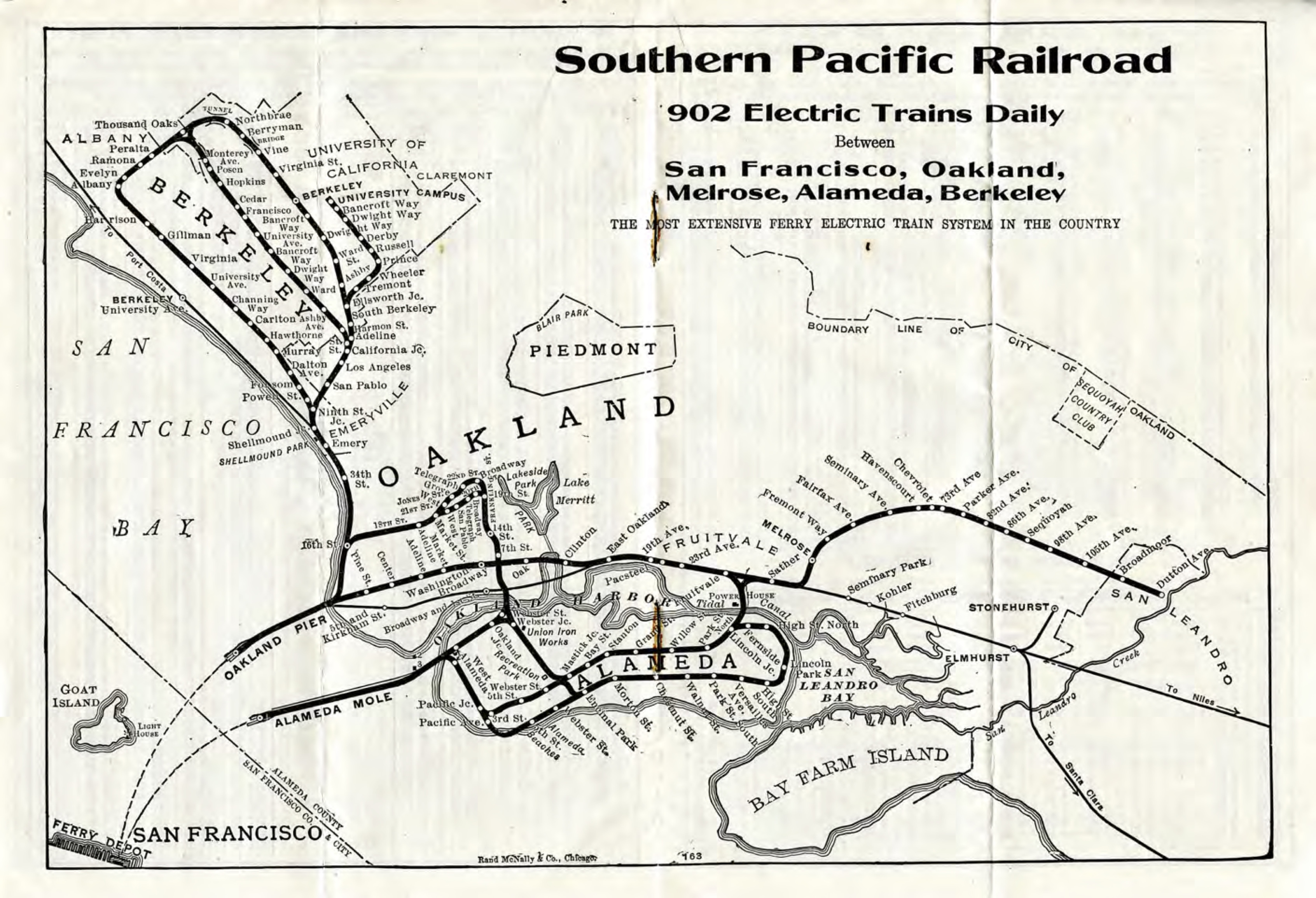
1919 map of the East Bay Electric Lines near their full extent

The East Bay Electric Lines were originally designated mainly by the names of their principal streets. They received numbers for Bay Bridge service. The most significant changes occurred as the result of the removal of the Harrison Street bridge between Oakland and Alameda in December 1923, and the agreement with the Key System in March 1933, with the Bay Bridge plans in view, to abandon duplicating lines, on the basis of which company first served each area.

The Oakland 7th Street Line carried the most passengers, with the Berkeley Shattuck Avenue Line being second. Patronage was at a maximum about 1920 and had declined by about half by the time of Bay Bridge operation.

The SP seemed to prefer to have groups of their lines terminate at the same place. Three lines originally terminated at Thousand Oaks in Berkeley, two at 14th and Franklin in Oakland, and two at High Street South in Alameda. The IER had two lines terminate at Thousand Oaks and two lines at West Alameda.

- Berkeley, California Street Line — Thousand Oaks station at the intersection of Solano and Colusa Avenues (Colusa Wye) in Berkeley, via Colusa, Monterey, private right-of-way, California, Stanford to the upper platform of the Oakland 16th Street station, thence to Oakland Pier. Opened as a newly-built line with partial service beginning on January 3, 1912. Terminated after March 31, 1933.
- Berkeley, Shattuck Avenue Line (originally Berkeley Branch Railroad steam line) — Thousand Oaks station (Colusa Wye) in Berkeley, via Solano, private right-of-way, Northbrae Tunnel, Sutter, Henry, Shattuck (stopping at Berkeley Station), Adeline, Stanford to the upper platform of the Oakland 16th Street Station, thence to Oakland Pier. Electric service began on December 23, 1911. Designated Line #3 (local) and #9 (express) for Bay Bridge service, re-routed direct to the bridge with no stop at Oakland 16th Street Station. During Bay Bridge operation, the last train of the day (early morning) to leave San Francisco was extended from Thousand Oaks along the outer 9th Street Line to Albany (San Pablo Avenue) because there was no 9th Street Line service at this time; this was the last IER service when terminated in July 1941.
- Berkeley, Ninth Street Line — Thousand Oaks station (Colusa Wye) in Berkeley, via Solano, Jackson, private right-of-way, Ninth Street to private right-of-way to Stanford to the upper platform of the 16th Street Station in Oakland, thence to Oakland Pier. Opened as a new line (not a converted steam service) on February 7, 1912. An extension beyond Albany to Richmond was surveyed in 1912, though never built. Designated Line #5 for Bay Bridge service, re-routed direct to the bridge with no stop at Oakland 16th Street Station. Terminated July 1941.
- Berkeley, Ellsworth Street Line — Ellsworth and Allston Way in Berkeley, via Ellsworth to Woolsey, Adeline, Stanford to the upper platform of the Oakland 16th Street Station, thence to Oakland Pier. A spur of the Berkeley Branch, electric service began on January 3, 1912. Line shortened one block to Bancroft Way in 1931. Terminated after March 31, 1933.
- Oakland, 7th Street, Dutton Avenue Line (originally San Francisco and Oakland Railroad steam line) — Dutton Avenue and Bancroft in San Leandro, through the neighborhoods of Eastmont (with freight service to the Chevrolet plant that became Eastmont Town Center decades later), Havenscourt, and Seminary, via Bancroft, Almond Street, then private right-of-way to 90th Avenue, then Blanche Street to 82nd Avenue, then private right-of-way to Ritchie Avenue, then Beck Street to 73rd Avenue, then private right-of-way to Church Street, then Beck Street to 64th Avenue, then private right-of-way to Seminary Avenue, then Bond Street to private right-of-way leading through Melrose and along the SP main line tracks through Fruitvale to 7th Street, then 7th to Oakland Pier. Almond, Blanche, Beck, Bond (as far as Fremont Way) and the private rights-of-ways connecting them are all now part of Bancroft Avenue, while the next private right-of-way is now Bancroft Way. Originally, regular trains operated only as far as Havenscourt and Beck, with a Suburban Connection train meeting every other train and operating to Dutton Avenue. Electric service began on December 30, 1911. Trains initially operated as far as 55th Avenue. Full electric service to Melrose began on December 13, 1912. Starting in February 1924 all trains operated to Dutton Avenue, but the last few cars of each outbound train were removed at Seminary Avenue, then added to the front of the next inbound train. During rush hour an additional express train operated via Alameda Pier and the Lincoln Avenue line, stopping only at Park Street North (Alameda), crossing the Fruitvale Bridge, joining the 7th Street line east of Fruitvale Station, and making limited stops to the end of the line. Designated Line #2 (local) and #7 (express) for Bay Bridge service, and re-routed via the upper platform of the Oakland 16th Street Station. Starting in March 1939, all cars operated through to Dutton Avenue. Terminated March 1941.
- Alameda, Encinal Avenue Line (originally South Pacific Coast Railroad steam line) — High Street South, via Encinal, Central, Main, private right-of-way to Alameda Pier. This was the inaugural electrified Southern Pacific line in the East Bay, starting service on June 1, 1911. Outbound trains arriving at High Street South became inbound Lincoln Avenue trains. Designated Line #4 eastbound and #6 westbound for Bay Bridge service, starting at West Alameda, via private right-of-way, Main, Central, Encinal, Fernside, private right-of-way, Fruitvale Bridge, private right-of-way alongside Fruitvale Avenue to junction with 7th Street line at Fruitvale Station. Southern Pacific had originally indicated its intent to electrify the entire Bay Area segment of the South Pacific Coast Line through Newark and San Jose to Los Gatos. Damage incurred to the San Leandro Bay Bridge during the 1906 San Francisco earthquake halted the railroad's plans for such a lengthy build out, with only the segment on Alameda Island outfitted with electric service. Terminated after January 17, 1941.
- Alameda, Lincoln Avenue Line (originally San Francisco and Alameda Railroad steam line) — High Street South, via Fernside, private right-of-way to Alameda Station at Park Street, then Lincoln to 5th Street, then private right-of-way to 4th Street, Pacific, Main, private right-of-way to Alameda Pier. Outbound trains arriving at High Street South became inbound Encinal Avenue trains. Designated Line #6 eastbound and #4 westbound for Bay Bridge service, starting at West Alameda, via private right-of-way to Main, then Pacific to 4th Street, then private right-of-way to 5th Street, Lincoln to Alameda Station, private right-of-way, Fruitvale Bridge, private right-of-way alongside Fruitvale Avenue to junction with 7th Street line at Fruitvale Station. Terminated after January 17, 1941.
- Alameda via Fruitvale (Horseshoe) Line (originally Central Pacific Railroad steam line) — Alameda Pier (or other Alameda location on Lincoln Avenue line) to Oakland Pier via Fruitvale Bridge. An important purpose of this line was to give Alameda residents access to main-line trains at Oakland Pier. Terminated, January 1939.
- Oakland, 18th Street Line — 14th and Franklin Station, via Franklin to 20th, 20th (alternating with 21st) to West Street, then via diagonal private right-of-way to 18th Street, 18th to the upper platform of the Oakland 16th Street Station, thence to Oakland Pier. Service began in March 1912. In 1926, starting at Webster and 2nd Street via Webster to 20th to Franklin and as before. Terminated after March 31, 1933.
- Oakland via Alameda Pier Line (originally South Pacific Coast Railroad steam line) — 14th and Franklin Station, via Webster, Harrison Street bridge, to private right-of-way to Alameda Pier. Electric service along Webster began on June 29, 1911. Terminated after December 26, 1923.
- Crosstown Streetcar Line — Oakland 16th Street Station, via 18th Street, then via diagonal private right-of-way to West Street to 20th (alternating with 21st) to Franklin, through 14th and Franklin Station to Webster Street to Harrison Street bridge to private right-of-way to Mastick (Alameda) to 8th to Central to Encinal to Fernside to private right-of-way to Lincoln to Mastick and back. Alternate cars went around the Alameda loop in the opposite direction. Some service was to 14th and Franklin only. In December 1923, all service was cut back to the 14th and Franklin station. Terminated March 1926.
- Mail trains — Starting in December 1923, mail trains, usually consisting of one box motor, loaded sacked mail several times a day at Oakland Pier and delivered it to Oakland 16th Street Station and to Berkeley Station. Mail from Oakland Pier was also delivered to Alameda Station, using trains of cars being sent from Oakland Pier to the Alameda Shops for maintenance and repair. Terminated November 1938.

== Equipment ==
=== Catenary equipment and substations ===
Electrification of the approximately 52 miles (84 km) of trackage began in early 1911, using No. 0000 grooved copper trolley wire, 7/16-inch (11 mm) messenger wires, and hanging loop catenary. Electrification was at 1200 volts direct current, which allowed for higher speeds, faster acceleration, and less power loss. Substations located at the Tidal Canal (along Fruitvale Avenue), Thousand Oaks, and West Oakland converted 1320 volt alternating current into 1200 volts direct current. Catenary cross-arms were of a simple construction, using a center iron pole (painted black) and trolley cross-arms at either 60 or 120 feet (18 or 37 m) of length to hold the catenary wiring.

There were different methods of the application of the towers to hold the catenary in certain settings on the lines. The East Bay Electric Lines had trackage over a series of estuaries and rivers, including the San Francisco Bay, which meant that due to the limitations of the infrastructure over these bodies of water the usual method of center-pole and cross-arm located in between the double-track was given up, in favor of 65-foot-tall (20 m) tall iron poles in a lattice-formation that held up the catenary. Additionally, this style of catenary construction was applied on the four track segment of track that paralleled the Southern Pacific's mainline via Oakland.

=== Car shops ===
In order to maintain its fleet of electric locomotives, the East Bay Electric Lines and later Interurban Electric Railway had two shops, the Alameda Shops and the Bridge Yard. The Alameda Shops were located at West Alameda, on the Oakland Estuary, and the Bridge Yard was the general maintenance yard for the Interurban Electric Railway and Key System just before the Bay Bridge.

=== Interurbans ===
==== American Car & Foundry Company interurbans ====
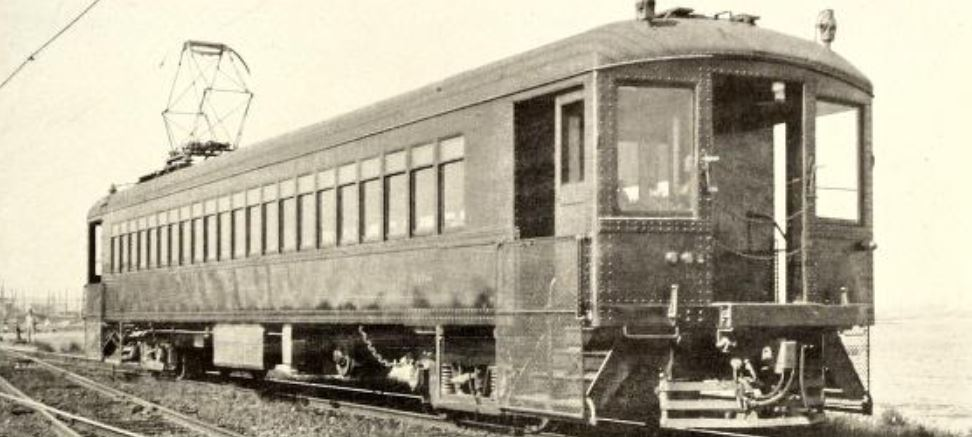
Photo of an original East Bay Electric Lines interurban when delivered by the American Car & Foundry Company. Note the rectangular windows.

To provide faster transportation on its commuter lines, Southern Pacific purchased steel interurbans from the American Car & Foundry Company (AC&FC). The first group of cars arrived in 1911 from the AC&FC and consisted of 40 powered passenger coaches (motors), 25 powered combination baggage-passenger cars (combos), and 50 unpowered passenger coaches (trailers), some with train controls and some without. They had large rectangular end windows, which proved to be a liability for train crews in accidents. Eventually, these rectangular end windows would be replaced with circular windows, reminiscent of portholes and similar to the Pennsylvania Railroad's MP54 electric suburbans. The circular windows however would not be applied to trailers, or trains that lacked train controls.

The first steel cars were 73 feet (22 m) long, and were moderately heavy as they weighed 1562 pounds per running foot (2324.5 kilograms per running meter). However, they were light when measuring weight per passenger due to their high capacity of seating. The large seating of the interurbans (which sat 2 to 3 people per seat) allowed for a general capacity of 116 patrons.

When first acquired by the AC&FC, the interurbans were painted an olive green, which was standard among most passenger cars of the time. Eventually the interurbans were repainted a bright red, which led to many patrons calling the interurbans the "Big Red Cars". The color remained until abandonment.

After abandonment of electric service in the East Bay, most of the interurban cars went to the Pacific Electric, though some were deeded by the California Toll Booth Authority and used in Utah and Nevada during World War 2. Most were retired when Pacific Electric ceased service in 1961, though some remain preserved in museums such as the Western Railway Museum, Southern California Railway Museum, and Travel Town Museum.

==== Pullman Company interurbans ====
Beginning in 1913, East Bay Electric commissioned the famous Pullman Car Company to produce a series of interurbans, similar to that of the American Car & Foundry Company's style construction. The style consisted of 10 motors, 4 combination cars, and 2 powered express-baggage cars (commonly known as box motors). These differed from the AC&FC's style because these new interurbans all featured the safer rounded windows in the front and backs in the original construction, and seated only 111 passengers.

After the abandonment of the East Bay Electric, all of these interurbans were sent to the Pacific Electric for conversion into the famous "Blimps" or "Red Cars". All were retired by 1953.

==== St. Louis Car Company interurbans ====
In addition to the AC&FC and Pullman built interurbans, the Southern Pacific commissioned the St. Louis Car Company to produce more interurbans. These cars were identical to their predecessors, bearing the rounded windows at the front and backs. Only six motors were produced. These cars seated only 108 patrons.

All were scrapped.

=== Streetcars ===
The East Bay Electric Lines also operated a series of more suburban local services, which were served by a series of streetcars, smaller and slower than the interurbans.

==== Pullman Company streetcars ====
The only company to manufacture streetcars for the East Bay Electric Lines was the Pullman car company. Twenty were manufactured, all featuring center-bay doors for boarding on low-platforms. The streetcars were meant for more local service, which also means they had a lower passenger seating limit, only 86 patrons.

In 1913 it was found that they had too many streetcars for the low demand of the line, so ten cars were sent to the Pacific Electric for operation there. However, two cars were brought back in 1919 due to a need for more streetcar services. In 1926, because of declining patronage, the streetcars were sent to rival Key System for operation on the subsidiary East Bay Street Railways (EBSR).

However, the EBSR was converting to one-man operation, which means that the motorman acts as the conductor too, and the streetcars were built for the traditional two man operation (meaning there would have been a motorman and a conductor). This led to their downfall, and in 1933 all were scrapped.

=== Operating practices and improvements ===
The usual operating practice was that the number of powered cars in a train was at least one more than the number of trailers. Trailers, with or without train controls, were always placed in the middle of trains; train controls on trailers were mainly used in assembling or disassembling trains. As ridership declined and trains became shorter, trailers were primarily used only during rush hour. Combos were used to carry checked baggage to and from main-line trains at Oakland Pier and to deliver bundled newspapers. They were usually put on the end of the train toward Oakland Pier, and most commonly on the 7th St Line as far as Havenscourt or Seminary Avenue. When plans for longer routes were not implemented, 21 of the ACF combos were changed to motors at the time they received their round end windows in the 1920s. Due to the heavy grades on the Bay Bridge, 10 trailers were changed to motors in 1938 when all the passenger-carrying cars were modified with automatic train control and other safety equipment for bridge operation. The California Toll Bridge Authority (TBA) funded these changes and received title to 58 cars in return. All cars carried the name "Southern Pacific Lines" until Bay Bridge service began, when the IER-owned cars were repainted with "Interurban Electric Railway Company".

Unlike most street railways, work rules dictating operations for employees were of a more restrictive type usually applied to mainline steam railroads, a situation which endured even with electric service.

== Aftermath ==
=== Lines ===
==== Revival of lines for Key System ====
The rival Key System assumed rights to some of the trackage and overhead wires of abandoned IER/SP routes. This had first occurred due to the 1933 consolidation. In March 1933, the abandoned California Street line in Berkeley from about Ada and California Streets, up Monterey Avenue to Colusa Avenue, was used for the Key's Sacramento Street Line (H line) until abandonment in July 1941. In April 1941, a portion of the abandoned 7th Street, Dutton Avenue Line in East Oakland, from East 14th Street to Havenscourt Boulevard, was used to extend the Key's 12th Street Line (A Line) until October 1950, when this line was cut back to 12th and Oak Streets. In August 1941, a portion of the Shattuck Avenue line in Berkeley, from about Dwight Way to the south end of the Northbrae Tunnel was used to extend the Key's Shattuck Ave Line (F Line). In December 1942, the F Line was extended through the tunnel to the intersection of Solano Avenue and The Alameda. The F Line was abandoned in April 1958.

Key System streetcars also used the IER Shattuck Avenue tracks from Parker Street to University Avenue until abandonment in November 1948. During World War II the Key System used a portion of the 7th Street, Dutton Avenue Line tracks in Oakland on 7th Street, from Broadway to Pine Street, for streetcar service to a shipyard and most of the 9th Street track of the 9th Street Line for the Richmond Shipyard Railway. Tracks on 7th Street west of Broadway were additionally reactivated under Key System cars to serve the ship yards in Oakland.

==== Freight service ====
SP freight service continued over parts of the 9th Street, Shattuck Avenue, 7th Street and Lincoln Avenue Lines. An excursion train pulled by a steam locomotive was operated over this track in April 1954, by the Bay Area Electric Railroad Association. By 1960, all except the part from the 9th Street Line had been abandoned.

==== Infrastructure remnants ====
Few pieces of infrastructure of the old electric service remain. The Northbrae Tunnel, which runs between Sutter Street and Solano Avenue underneath the Fountain Roundabout, is one of the most physical remains of the SP/IER. The tunnel once was a main artery for the SP interurbans into Thousand Oaks, and was used by Key System well after abandonment of SP electric service.

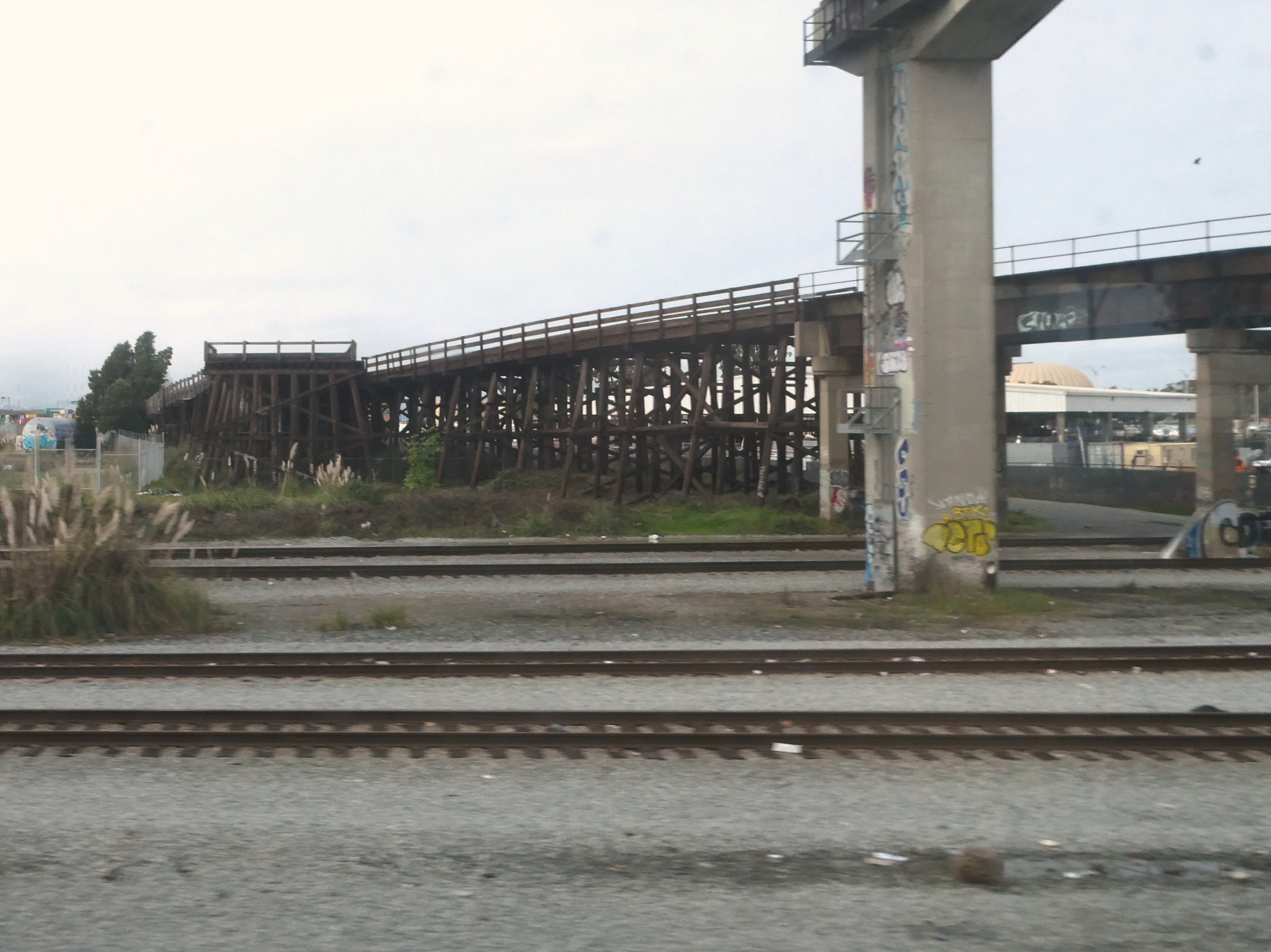
The former trestle over the SP mainline near 26th Street in Oakland, seen in December 2021.

Additionally, the elevated platforms of the IER still exist at Southern Pacific's 16th Street Station in Oakland. Although interurban service ceased to the elevated platforms in 1941, the platforms were never torn down and still remain today as a visible reminder of former IER service. However, both approach trestles to the elevated platform were demolished during abandonment. The trestle that crosses the Southern Pacific mainline however still exists, partially. The northbound portion of the trestle was formerly in use by the Oakland Terminal Railway, a Key System subsidiary meant to handle freight. Sections of the trestle have been cut down, such as large sections of the former double-tracked bridge, which was downgraded to single-track during the sixties and seventies, after switching motions were no longer required on the bridge. The southbound portion of the trestle was converted to a road after abandonment, and does not exist anymore aside from a 280 foot long section. Since 2011, the Oakland Terminal Railway has no longer used the trestle for a variety of reasons, most notably being a 4% grade and weight limits. A lack of customers caused the line to cease using the trestle. Since then there is no track access on either side, leaving it isolated from the national rail network.

Aside from the Northbrae Tunnel, 16th Street Station, and trestle, nothing else too visible remains. The Emeryville Greenway between 9th Street and Stanford Avenue is a section of former IER right of way that serviced the interurban line to Thousand Oaks.

=== Equipment ===
After the SP streetcar line was abandoned in 1926, all 12 cars were sold to the Key System.

After IER service ended, the TBA separated its 58 cars from the SP's 89 cars. In 1942, the TBA sold 6 motors for scrap in January and the remaining 52 cars to the Houston Shop Corp., which shipped them via the SP to Houston. One of the TBA trailers was wrecked in transit, so the SP replaced it with one of its trailers. The SP sent the 2 box motors to the PE, in March and April used 5 trailers for buildings in West Oakland, and stored their remaining 81 cars until they were requisitioned in July and September by the United States Maritime Commission for use in transporting workers to World War II shipyards: 20 trailers to a line in the Portland, Oregon, area and 61 cars to the PE in Southern California where some of them were in use until that system ceased operations in 1961. A few of the cars have been preserved:

IER Number	Preserved Number	Current Status
302	Pacific Electric 498	In Operational Condition at the Southern California Railway Museum in Perris, California.
315	Pacific Electric 4601	Displayed on freight trucks at the Southern California Live Steamers in Torrance, California. Owned by Torrance Historical Society. Badly deteriorated.
344	Pacific Electric 418	In Operational Condition at the Southern California Railway Museum in Perris, California.
332	Pacific Electric 457	Displayed on freight trucks at the Western Railway Museum in Rio Vista, California.
358	Interurban Electric 358	Displayed at the Western Railway Museum in Rio Vista, California.
379	LAMTA 1543	Displayed at the Travel Town Museum in Griffith Park Los Angeles, California.
600	Interurban Electric 600	Displayed at the Western Railway Museum in Rio Vista, California.
602	Interurban Electric 602	Displayed at the Western Railway Museum in Rio Vista, California.
603	Interurban Electric 603	Displayed at the Western Railway Museum in Rio Vista, California.

== Ridership ==
Annual ridership
Year	Ridership	%±
1920	22,000,000	—
1936	14,000,000	—
1937	12,000,000	−14.3%
1938	11,000,000	−8.3%
1939	9,900,000	−10.0%

== See also ==
- List of California street railroads
- List of interurban railways
- The Key System; another transbay commuter rail system that served the East Bay during the same era.
