= Williams College (disambiguation) =

Williams College is a private liberal arts college in Williamstown, Massachusetts.

Williams College may also refer to:

- George Williams College (Chicago) in Chicago, Illinois
- Roger Williams University in Bristol, Rhode Island
- Sir George Williams University in Montreal, Quebec
- St William's College, a mediaeval building in York, England
- Williams Baptist College in Walnut Ridge, Arkansas
- Williams College in Berkeley, California, founded by Cora Lenore Williams
