= Mark Daniels =

California urban designer and civil engineer

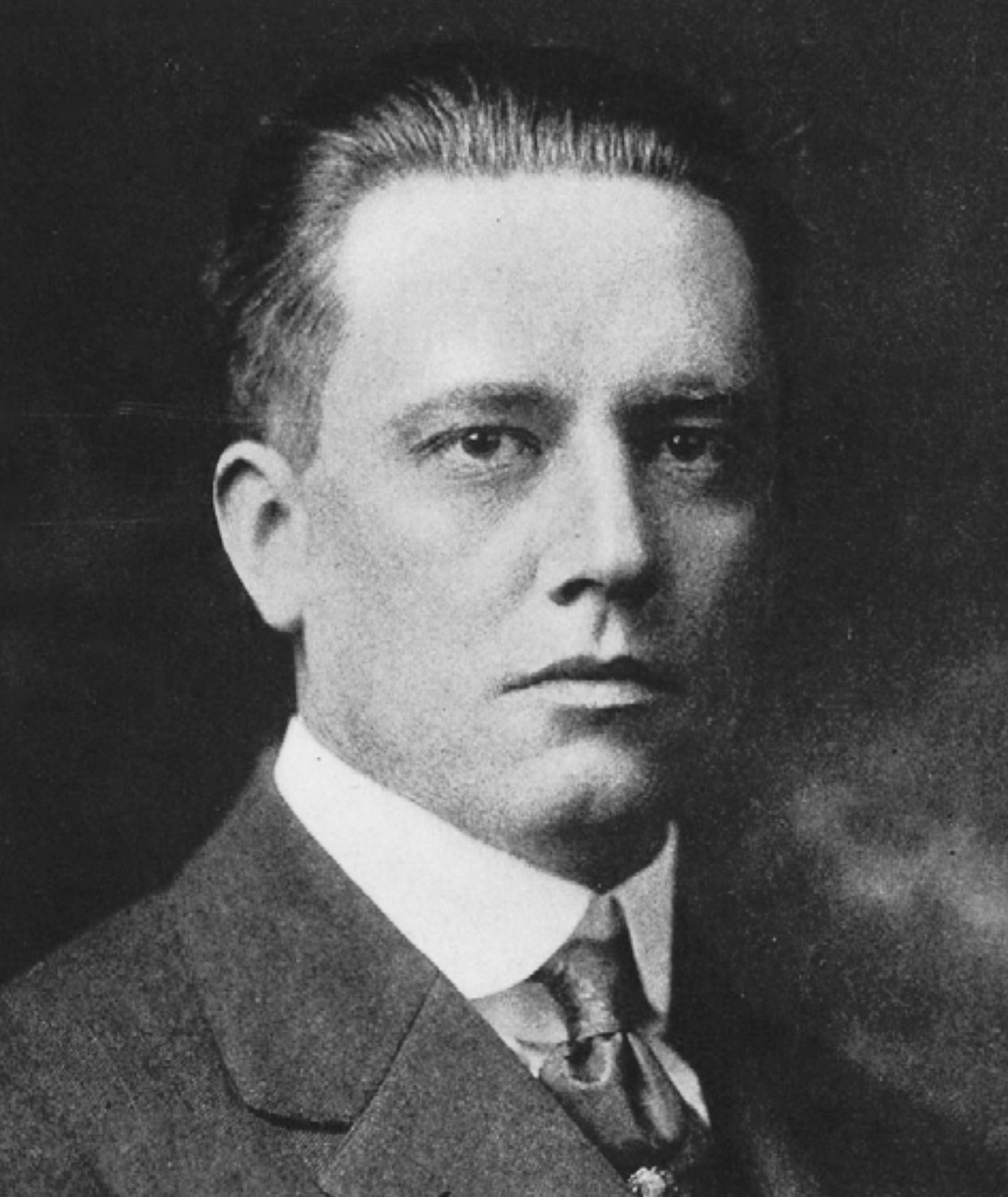
- Mark Daniels (1914)
- Born: 1881; Spring Arbor, Michigan, US
- Died: January 14, 1952 (aged 70–71); San Francisco, California, US
- Occupations: architect, landscape architect
- Spouse: Frances Trost

Mark Roy Daniels (July 14, 1881– January 14, 1952) was an architect, landscape architect, civil engineer, and city planner active in California. He was known for creating plans that incorporated existing natural features in order to preserve a sense of local character. He worked on master plans for the development of neighborhoods in San Francisco and the East Bay, on the Monterey Peninsula, in Los Angeles, and elsewhere. In the years immediately preceding the formation of the National Park System, he was briefly the general superintendent and landscape engineer for the entire system of national parks under the United States Department of the Interior.

== Education and family ==
Daniels was born in Spring Arbor, Michigan. He attended the University of California, Berkeley, graduating with a B.S. degree in civil engineering in 1905. He went on to do graduate work in city planning and architecture at Harvard University.

Daniels was married four times. His first wife, Frances “Dolly” Trost (1888–1941) was a singer and artist.

He served as an army captain during World War I.

== Master planning ==
Daniels began his career as a civil engineer, working in a range of positions from placer mine superintendent to railroad engineer. He eventually opened an office in San Francisco, and in 1908 East Bay real estate developer John Hopkins Spring became his first important landscape design client. Spring had acquired 100 acres in the largely undeveloped Thousand Oaks area of Berkeley and proposed to turn it into a residential area with a small park. Daniels planned the entire subdivision, deliberately working around existing natural features, especially major rock outcroppings. Daniels also landscaped Spring's own estate in the East Bay, now a designated City of Berkeley Landmark.

Daniels also developed the master plans for the Forest Hill and Sea Cliff neighborhoods of San Francisco.

Elsewhere in California, Daniels was involved with master planning on the Monterey Peninsula, especially Pebble Beach, Carmel Woods, and the 17-Mile Drive; the designer Chesley Bonestell worked as his assistant on these designs. He moved to Los Angeles, where he designed the Villa Aurora and worked on the master plan for Bel Air.

In the 1920s, Daniels expanded into architecture as well as landscape design and city planning. He was a great admirer of Chinese architecture and landscape design, and when he moved back to San Francisco, the projects he worked on included the Chinese Village at the Golden Gate International Exposition of 1939–40 and a public housing project in Chinatown.

=== Major projects ===
- 17-Mile Drive on the Monterey Peninsula (ca. 1916)
- Bel Air, Los Angeles
- Castellammare, Pacific Palisades, Los Angeles (ca. 1928)
- Chinese Village at Golden Gate International Exposition (1939–40)
- Crocker-Amazon, San Francisco
- Forest Hill, San Francisco (ca. 1912)
- John Hopkins Spring Estate, Berkeley (1912–14)
- Pebble Beach, California (ca. 1916)
- Ping Yuen public housing project, Chinatown (1939–42)
- Sea Cliff, San Francisco (ca. 1914)
- St. Mary's Park, San Francisco (1920s)
- Thousand Oaks, Berkeley, California
- Villa Aurora, Pacific Palisades (1927–28)

== Park superintendent ==
In 1914, Daniels took up the post of landscape engineer for Yosemite National Park, where the existing buildings were in poor condition and there were issues with sanitation and water supply. He was tasked with developing a "comprehensive general plan for the development of the floor of the Yosemite Valley". Two months later, he was appointed general superintendent and landscape engineer of all the national parks. He spent the summers of 1914 and 1915 touring parks in the system to understand their problems but kept his private practice going during the winters. It proved an impossible job, not solely because he was working at it part-time, but because, as he himself pointed out, "it is not humanly possible" for one man to combine the very different duties of general superintendent and landscape engineer for the national parks.

These difficulties were exacerbated by struggles with other administrators over centralization of planning, with the result that Daniels was pushed to resign after only a year and a half. During his brief tenure, he designed the first uniforms for civilian park rangers and (in 1915) offered the first comprehensive statement of principles for the establishment and management of national parks. In addition, foreseeing a major expansion of visitors to national parks, he drew up plans for "park villages" in such high-profile parks as Yosemite, Glacier National Park, and Mount Rainier National Park. None of these were carried out in their original form — though elements were incorporated into later plans — but as in all his other design work, Daniels stressed the importance of taking the local topography and environment into account so as to create visual congruity with the surrounding landscape.

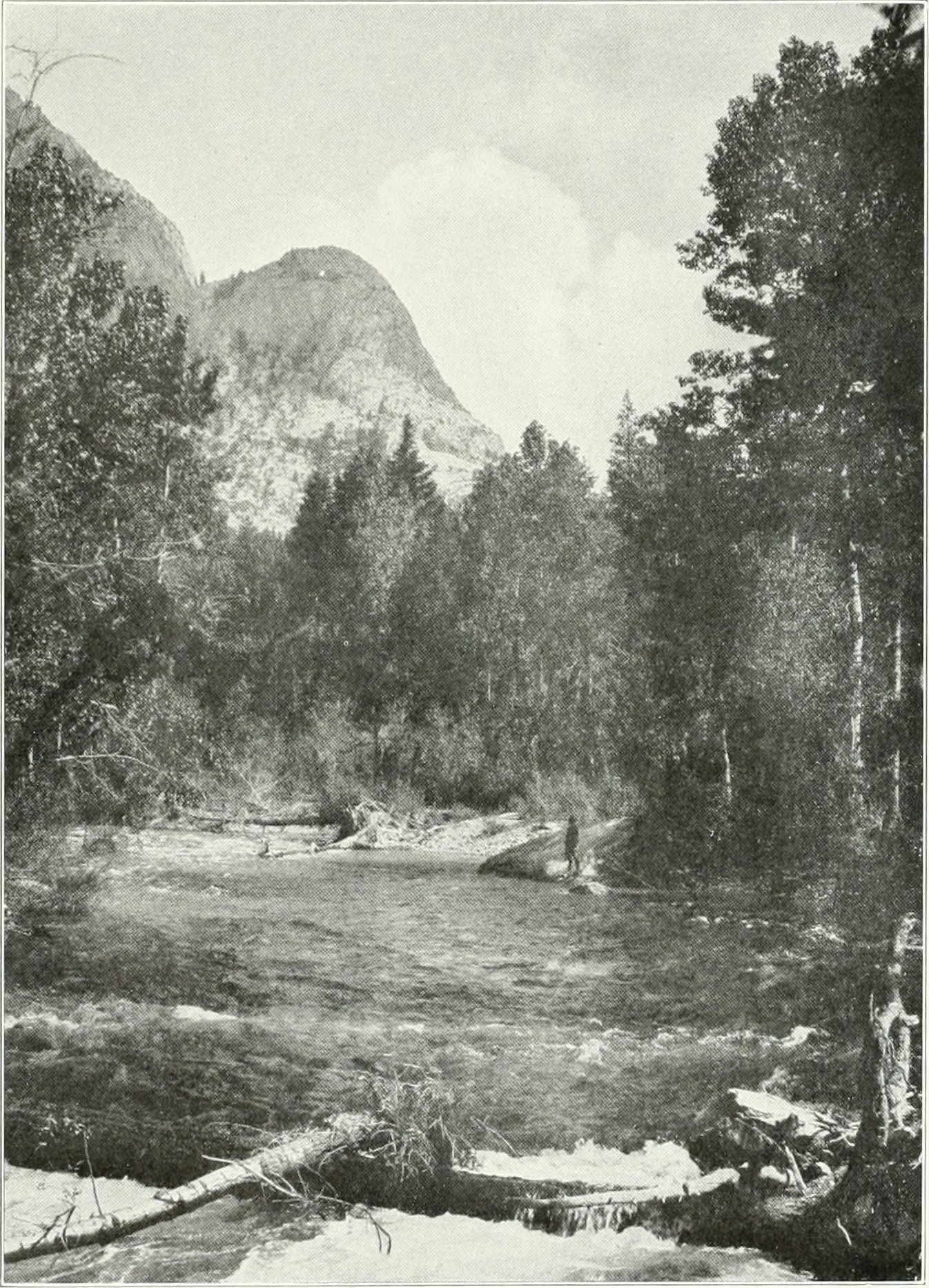
Photo of the Kern River near Funston Meadows in Sequoia National Park by Mark Daniels, 1916.

== Writing ==
After leaving his position as park superintendent, Daniels continued to promote the national parks through a long series of articles in American Forestry magazine. Many of his glowing accounts of specific parks were illustrated with his own photographs and drawings.

=== Selected publications ===
- "The National Parks of California" (California's magazine, 1915)
- "The Tree of Legend and Romance" (American Forestry, February 1916)
- "Mesa Verde and Casa Grande National Parks" (American Forestry, February 1916)
- "The Grand Canyon of the Colorado" (American Forestry, April 1916)
- "Yosemite National Park" (American Forestry, June 1916)
- "Glacier National Park" (American Forestry, July 1916)
- "Yellowstone National Park" (American Forestry, August 1916)
- "Mount Rainier National Park" (American Forestry, September 1916)
- "Crater Lake National Park" (American Forestry, October 1916)
- "The Peak of Mount Russell" (American Forestry, November 1916)
- "Across the High Sierras" (American Forestry, November 1916)
- "Rocky Mountain National Park" (American Forestry, December 1916)

== Death ==
Daniels died on January 14, 1952, at Franklin Hospital, now California Pacific Medical Center in San Francisco, California, after a long illness. Funeral services were held at Dierks & Co., in San Francisco.
