= John Hopkins Spring Estate =

Coordinates: 37.8985°N 122.2754°W

The John Hopkins Spring Estate is a large estate in Berkeley, California. The associated Spring Mansion was built in the 1910s by East Bay developer John Hopkins Spring and designed by architect John Hudson Thomas. It later became the site of a school founded by educator Cora Lenore Williams. It has been listed as a City of Berkeley Landmark since 2000.

== Location ==
The estate currently occupies 3.25 acres in Berkeley in the Berkeley Hills. Formerly covering 20 acres, it was associated with three separate addresses: 639 Arlington Avenue, 1960 San Antonio Ave., and 1984 San Antonio Ave. The latter address was the carriage house, which was at some point sold off as a separate property. It faces west onto Arlington Avenue and at the time it was built had a sweeping view of San Francisco Bay.

== History ==
Designed by John Hudson Thomas, the two-story, 12,000-square-foot Spring Mansion was built in 1912–14. Though modeled after the Achilleion Palace in Corfu that was built by Empress Elisabeth of Austria in the 1890s, it was constructed entirely of steel-reinforced concrete. The Beaux Arts-influenced exterior conceals an eclectic interior with elements drawn from the American Arts and Crafts movement and the Vienna Secession. Balustraded terraces lead down into the grounds, which were originally designed by Mark Daniels and include a fountain and a reflecting pool.

The house was built by East Bay developer John Hopkins Spring, best known for being one of the investors behind the Claremont Hotel. Spring didn't live there very long, moving out after his 1915 divorce. At that time, his financial difficulties caused him to sell off parts of the 20-acre property, leaving the mansion with less than 4 acres.

In 1917, the property was sold to Cora Lenore Williams, who established a new school in the mansion called the Institute for Creative Development (later expanded into Williams College). The school remained there for five decades before closing in 1966.

In 1975 the estate was purchased as a private residence and remained so until 2005, when it passed to a consortium of investors. It has been on the market intermittently since then.

In 2000, the John Hopkins Spring Estate was designated a City of Berkeley Landmark. It is listed in the California State Historic Resources Inventory.
