= F (AC Transit) =

Bus service in Oakland and San Leandro, California

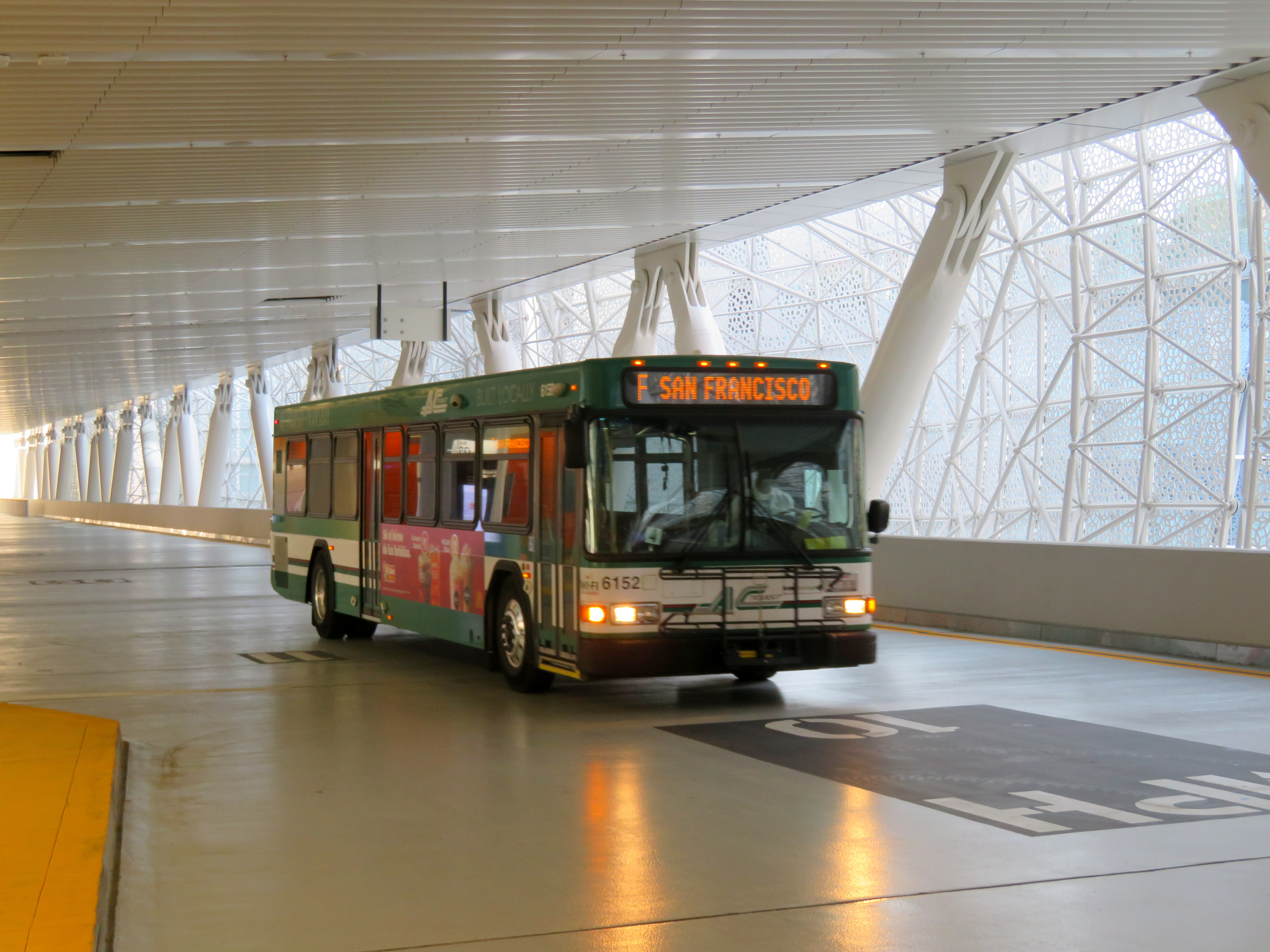
- Route F bus in the Salesforce Transit Center, August 2018

Overview
- Operator: Key System (1903–1960); AC Transit (1960–present)
- Began service: October 26, 1903

Route
- Locale: Berkeley, Emeryville, San Francisco
- Start: University of California, Berkeley
- Via: Adeline, Market, 40th
- End: Salesforce Transit Center
- Stations: 36
- Timetable: F
- Map: F

The F is a bus service operated by AC Transit in the San Francisco Bay Area. It is one of the operator's many transbay routes, which are intended to provide riders a long-distance service across the San Francisco Bay between the East Bay and San Francisco. It specifically connected San Francisco with Emeryville and Berkeley. The service is descendant of the foundational Key System streetcar and ferry line that operated prior to the formation of AC Transit.

== History ==
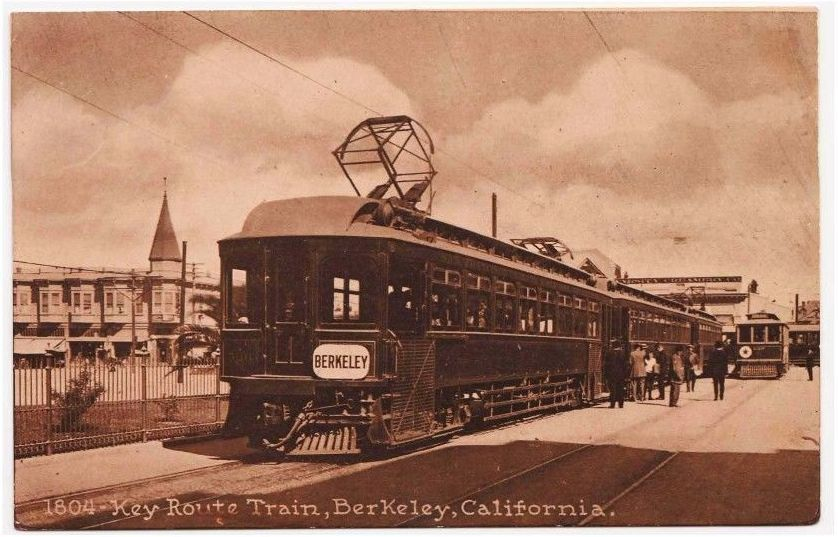
Key Route train at Berkeley station, c. 1907–1915

Business interests controlled by Francis Marion "Borax" Smith obtained a franchise to run streetcars on Shattuck and Adeline streets by June 1902, seeking to directly compete the parallel Southern Pacific Berkeley Branch Railroad. The line opened for traffic on October 26 the following year complete with a ferry connection to San Francisco. The service was very successful, with the number of scheduled trains doubling within the first month of operation. Key System cars began sharing trackage along Shattuck with the Southern Pacific starting in 1930, though Adeline trains were discontinued past Alcatraz Avenue after March 31, 1933.

Cars began running across the San Francisco–Oakland Bay Bridge to the Transbay Terminal upon the facility's opening in 1939. The Key System adopted letter designations for its transbay routes at this time, with the Berkeley route designated as F and rollsigns reading Berkeley via Shattuck Avenue. The line was extended over former Interurban Electric Railway trackage to Hopkins and Sutter Streets (the stop formerly called Northbrae) to the Northbrae Tunnel beginning August 6, 1941, reestablishing service to downtown Berkeley. Service was extended through the tunnel to a new terminal at Solano Avenue and The Alameda on December 6, 1942. The five-car train necessary for rush hour services was locally referred to as the City of Berkeley (a reference to mainline transcontinental rail services in operation at the time). Rail service ended after April 20, 1958, and motor coaches began operating on the line.

=== Public ownership ===
AC Transit took over operation of the Key system's assets in October 1960. By then, the F's route had been established to run on Market Street in Oakland. In September 1961, service was extended down Solano Avenue for evening and Saturday runs, a move which was further applied to all trips starting in 1970. In 1973, some trips were extended slightly further down San Pablo to Buchanan, similarly applied to all service in 1975.

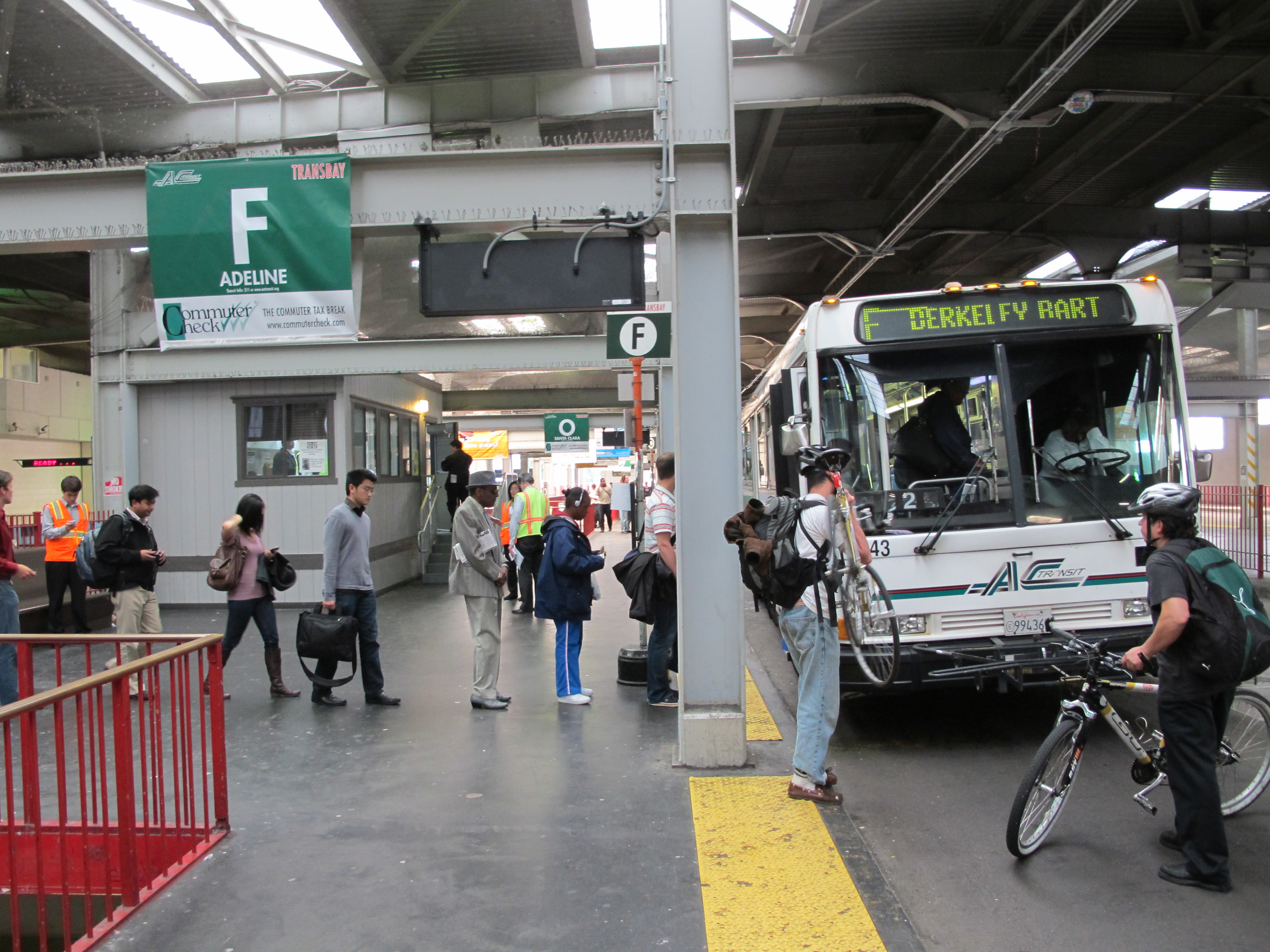
Boarding the F Bus at the Transbay Terminal, Aug. 6, 2010

Buses ceased serving the Transbay Terminal on August 7, 2010, and the San Francisco terminus was moved to the Temporary Transbay Terminal. The F line began running to the Salesforce Transit Center on August 12, 2018.
