= Emeryville Greenway =

Pedestrian and bicycle path in the San Francisco Bay Area

The Emeryville Greenway is a pedestrian and bicycle path in the East Bay region of the San Francisco Bay Area, constructed and maintained by the City of Emeryville along what was previously the Emeryville portion of the 9th Street Line of the Southern Pacific's East Bay Electric Lines.
