= Solano Avenue =

Street in California, United States

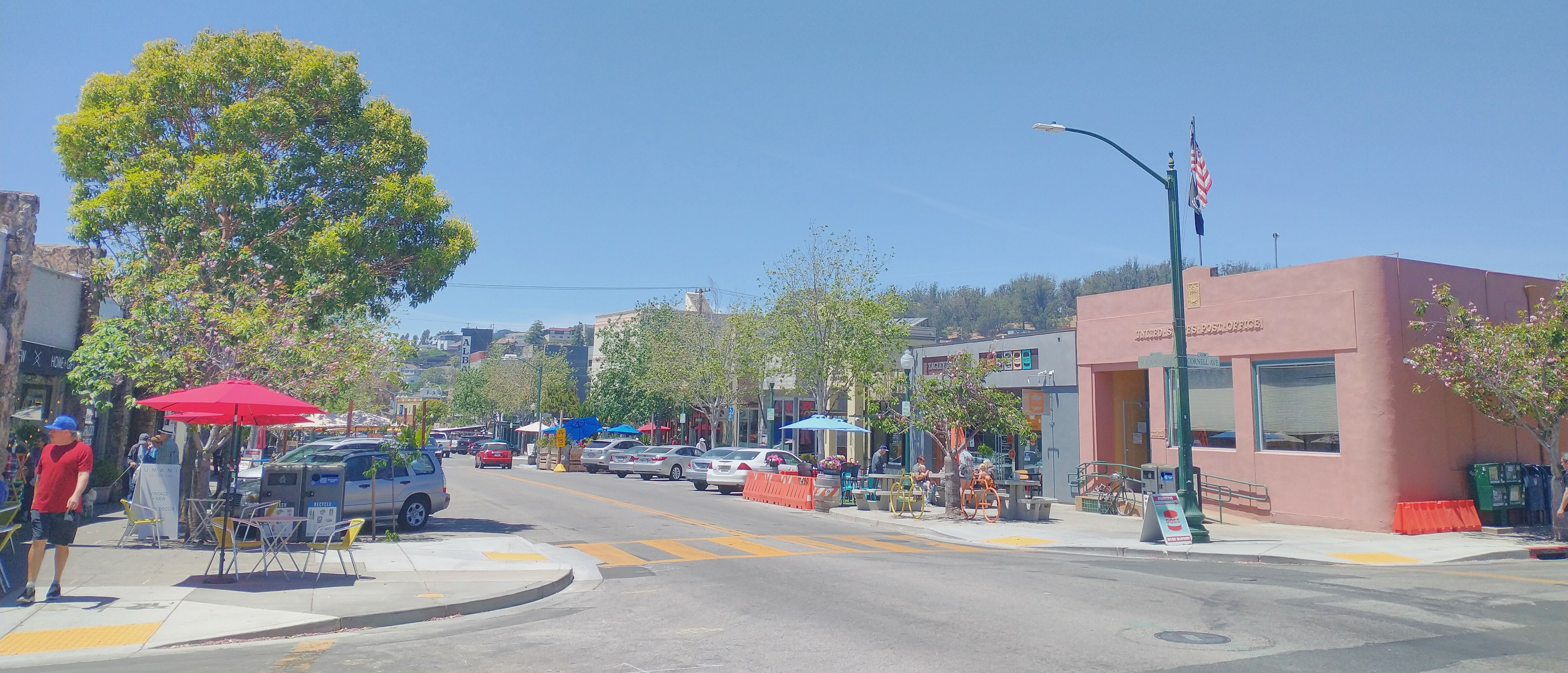
- Solano Avenue in Albany
- Interactive map of Solano Avenue
- Length: 2 mi (3.2 km)
- Location: Albany and Berkeley, California
- Coordinates: 37°53′26.33″N 122°17′32.49″W
- West end: Cleveland Avenue on the southern slope of Albany Hill in Albany
- Major junctions: SR 123 / San Pablo Avenue in Albany
- East end: Del Norte and El Dorado Streets near the Northbrae Tunnel in Berkeley

Solano Avenue in Berkeley and Albany, California is a two-mile (3.2 km) long east-west street. Solano Avenue is one of the larger shopping districts in the Berkeley area. Businesses along Solano Avenue cover a wide range, including grocery stores, coffee shops, drugstores, bookstores, antique dealers, apparel outlets, ethnic restaurants and a movie theater.

== Route ==
Solano Avenue begins, at its western end, on the southern slope of Albany Hill, next to the I-80/I-580 interchange and Union Pacific railroad tracks. The Albany Hill segment of the street is primarily residential and somewhat steep, climbing 86 feet (26 m) in the first three blocks.

At San Pablo Avenue, Solano bends slightly to the south; this is the start of the shopping district. Solano Avenue serves as the de facto Main Street of Albany, and initially, this was in fact its name within the city of Albany. Solano passes under the elevated BART tracks at Masonic Avenue. For four and a half blocks, starting half a block after Curtis Street, the northern side of Solano is in Berkeley, while the southern side and the street itself are in Albany. Between the Albany city limits and The Alameda, Solano Avenue is the main shopping area of Berkeley's Thousand Oaks neighborhood. Landmarks along this segment of the street include the Oaks Theater, a movie palace built in 1925, which has recently closed down, and the first Andronico's grocery store, formerly known as "Andronico's Park and Shop" (for a time, simply "Park and Shop").

After crossing The Alameda, Solano Avenue continues eastward to the Northbrae Tunnel. This tunnel was constructed by the Southern Pacific for its Shattuck Avenue line suburban trains. The Shattuck line met the California Street and Ninth Street lines at the "Colusa Wye" (see Wye (rail)), roughly occupying the area just west of where Andronico's is situated and extending into the block west of Colusa. This terminus for the three lines was also known as "Thousand Oaks Station". After the SP abandoned its commuter lines in 1941, its tracks along Solano were removed, but the right-of-way east of the Alameda was subsequently acquired by the Key System for its F line trains. The Key F-Line railway ran to its terminus at Solano and The Alameda until 1958, when the system was dismantled and the right-of-way east of The Alameda was converted to motor vehicle use (including the F-Line buses of the Key's successor AC Transit), opening on December 15, 1962. Solano Avenue thus passes through the Northbrae Tunnel (constructed in 1911 by the Southern Pacific, and now also referred to as the Solano Ave. Tunnel), which curves to the south. Solano Avenue ends at its intersection with Del Norte and El Dorado Streets just beyond the south portal of the tunnel.

== Solano Stroll ==
Every year on the second Sunday of September, businesses along Solano Avenue host a street festival called the Solano Avenue Stroll. Founded in 1974/75 by Ira Klein, who managed Berkeley boutique "The Iris", the event initially began on the East end of Solano Avenue as an "open house" of Solano Avenue retail businesses, and eventually included the entire Solano shopping district between San Pablo Avenue in Albany and The Alameda in Berkeley.

During the Stroll, Solano Avenue and all cross streets are closed to traffic. Local businesses and vendors set up booths along both sides of the street and sell clothing, jewelry, art and food items to the public; in recent times, theatre troupes, puppet shows and amusement rides have also been a part of the festival. Various live bands, most local, have played sets at the Stroll, with notable past musicians including RatDog drummer/Primus co-founder Jay Lane (with jam side project Alphabet Soup) and Marc Biedermann (founder of Blind Illusion, and former bassist for thrash metal band Heathen). School jazz, classical and marching bands from Richmond, El Cerrito, Albany and Berkeley have also appeared at the Stroll since its early years.

The event opens with a parade down Solano. As the end of the parade moves downhill, the street is gradually opened to pedestrians only, and stays that way until late in the afternoon. According to a University of California-Berkeley press report, the 2005 event attracted between 120,000 and 150,000 attendees. Around 300,000 people were attributed by organizers to have attended the 2009 festival, a number largely overshadowed by vacant Solano Avenue storefronts and the late 2000s economic downturn.

In 2001, the Solano Stroll was designated a "National Local Legacy" by The Library of Congress.

== Public transportation ==
Solano Avenue has in the past doubled as a right-of-way for two interurban rail lines, the Southern Pacific Railroad and the Key System, and was intersected by the Santa Fe Railroad.

Three of the Southern Pacific's Interurban Electric Railway met at the "Colusa Wye": the Ninth Street line, the California Street line, and the Shattuck Avenue line. On the north side of this junction, the Southern Pacific constructed an electric sub-station whose legacy survives in the name of a small cul-de-sac behind the former site of the building (now demolished). The junction was also the terminus of the three lines, called "Thousand Oaks Station". After the SP abandoned its electric trains in 1941, the rival Key System took over the tracks of the Shattuck Avenue line through the Northbrae Tunnel, but terminating at a stop east of The Alameda. The tracks on Solano were paved over and the catenary wires removed. Until the early 2000s, the trace of these tracks was still visible in the pavement on Solano adjacent to Colusa. After the Key System abandoned its train service to San Francisco in 1958, and upon the opening of the Northbrae Tunnel to auto traffic in 1962, AC Transit ran its F and 33 bus lines to the former Key System stop east of The Alameda, with alternate runs continuing down Solano to a terminus at San Pablo.

Solano Avenue also intersected Key System streetcar lines at San Pablo Avenue and The Alameda. When BART was built alongside the Santa Fe's right-of-way, a station at Solano Avenue wasn't included. However, it is only about a 15–20 minute walk to both the El Cerrito Plaza and North Berkeley BART stations.

AC Transit currently operates bus service on Solano Avenue, and three local bus lines connect Solano to Downtown Berkeley. Line 18 runs along the entire length of Solano. Line 7 goes through the Northbrae/Solano Avenue Tunnel and stops at The Alameda before turning. Line 27 makes two stops, at The Alameda and Colusa Avenue. In addition, lines 72, 72M, and 72L cross Solano at San Pablo Avenue.

Several AC Transit transbay buses connect Solano Avenue to San Francisco. The G line runs along Solano between Colusa and San Pablo, while the FS line covers the part of Solano east of Colusa. Line L crosses the western end at Pierce Street.

== Historical items ==
- Solano Avenue was named for Solano County. Many other streets in the vicinity of Solano are likewise named for California counties. This was done as part of a campaign in the early 1900s to have the state capital moved from Sacramento to Berkeley. The legislature put the proposal on the 1908 ballot, but the measure lost by 35,000 votes.
- The portion of Solano Avenue within the city of Albany was originally named "Main Street" but this was soon changed to conform to the name "Solano" used within the city of Berkeley.
- Upper Solano Avenue was an important hub of the Southern Pacific's East Bay Electric Lines (later called the "Interurban Electric Railway" after the Bay Bridge was constructed). Three lines intersected at Solano and Colusa Avenues, the "Colusa Wye": the Shattuck Avenue line (using Solano Ave. between The Alameda and Colusa Ave.), the California Street line, and the Ninth Street line (using Solano Ave between Colusa Ave. and Jackson St.). The station here was called "Thousand Oaks". The Southern Pacific also maintained an electric substation on the north side of the intersection which supplied power to the entire northern section of the East Bay Electric Lines. A small cul de sac behind the building that now occupies the site of the old substation is still called "Station Place".
- A watchman's tower, the Masonic Tower, used to sit at the intersection of the Santa Fe and Southern Pacific tracks, on Solano between Masonic Avenue and Key Route Blvd. Today, a dry cleaning establishment occupies the site.
- After the Key System acquired the use of the Southern Pacific's Shattuck Avenue line tracks for its F-line, its trains terminated on the east side of The Alameda.
