= Market and 1st Street / Market and Battery stations =

Tram stop in San Francisco, California, United States

Market and 1st Street Market and Battery
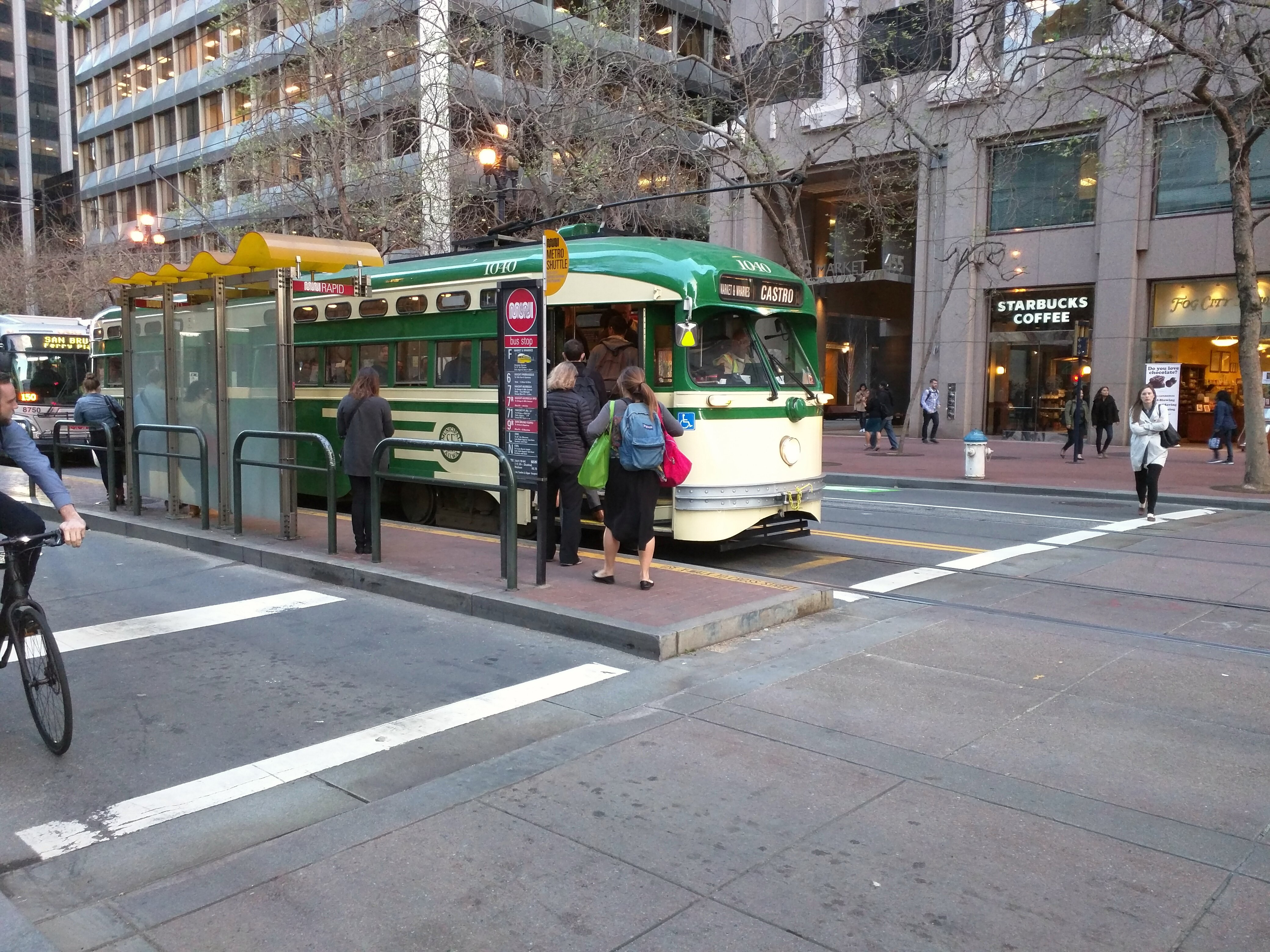
- Streetcar at Market and 1st Street in 2016

General information
- Location: Market Street at 1st and Battery Streets; San Francisco, California
- Coordinates: 37°47′28.3″N 122°23′58.3″W
- Platforms: 2 side platforms
- Tracks: 2

Construction
- Accessible: Partial, Market and 1st Street (eastbound) only

History
- Rebuilt: September 1, 1995

Services
Preceding station	Muni	Following station
Market and 2nd Street / Market and New Montgomery toward 17th Street and Castro	F Market & Wharves	Market and Main / Market and Drumm toward Jones and Beach
Location

Market and 1st Street (eastbound) and Market and Battery (westbound) stations are a pair of light rail stations in San Francisco, California, United States, serving the San Francisco Municipal Railway F Market & Wharves heritage railway line. They are located on Market Street at the intersections of 1st Street and Battery Street. The low-level platforms are also utilized by several bus and trolleybus routes.

Under the planned Better Market Street project, the outbound F stop would be discontinued to reduce travel times.
