= Melrose, Oakland, California =

Settlement in Oakland, California

Coordinates: 37°46′12″N 122°12′19″W

Melrose is a neighborhood in Oakland in Alameda County, California. It lies at an elevation of 43 feet (13 m). There is at least one school in the neighborhood, Bridges Academy. It teaches kindergarten through fifth grade.
