= Cora Lenore Williams =

American novelist

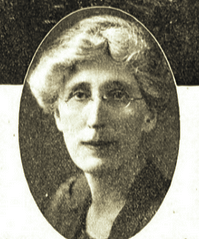
Williams in 1925

Cora Lenore Williams (1865 – December 14, 1937) was a writer and educator known for pioneering new approaches to small-group instruction for children. She founded the A-Zed School and the Institute for Creative Development, later renamed Williams College, in Berkeley, California.

== Educational career ==
Williams graduated from the University of California, Berkeley, in 1891. She taught high school in Oakland and was said to be the first woman instructor in mathematics at the University of California. In the process, she became critical of the way children are taught, writing:

"The real issue in education ... is not a question of method or curriculum, but of the massing of children. Instead of aiming for freedom and independence of thought, our formal education imposes a pattern on the growing mind—puts it into a universal mold. We mass our children into an agglomerative whole, and then wonder that they emerge bereft of personality and initiative."

Williams founded two secondary schools in which the focus was on small classes, cooperation rather than individual competition, and developing a love for learning rather than inculcating a specific curriculum. The first of these, the A-Zed School in Berkeley, was founded in 1907. Ormeida Curtis Harrison, wife of the naturalist Charles Keeler, was her assistant principal. Williams remained the school's principal for a decade, before moving on to found another school.

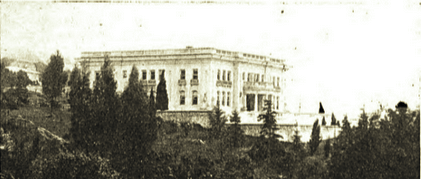
Cora L. Williams Institute (1925)

In 1917, Williams bought the John Hopkins Spring Estate in the Berkeley hills to house a new institution, the Cora L. Williams Institute for Creative Development, an elementary and secondary school focused on music, poetry, literature, and languages and on creative methods of instruction. It eventually transformed into a cluster of educational institutions under the supertitle Williams College, including a four-year private liberal arts college, a preparatory school, and schools of research, poetry, arts, and metaphysics. Notable lecturers at the school included the psychologist Alfred Adler, and notable students included Helen Bacon Hooper, who danced with Martha Graham, and author Irving Wallace. Founded in 1918, the school was housed on the estate for five decades; it closed in 1966.

Williams' educational experiments drew international interest, and Williams College has been called "the first New Age institute". Its site, the John Hopkins Spring Estate, was designated a City of Berkeley Landmark in 2000.

== Writings ==
Williams had a strong interest in mathematics and philosophy, especially metaphysics, and she published several books centered on metaphysical rumination. Creative Involution (1916) is a response to Henri Bergson's Creative Evolution, which had appeared five years earlier. Starting from Bergson's insistence on the fact that "the evolution of life [is] in the double direction of individuality and association", Williams emphasizes the necessity for greater attention to the principle of cohesion or association which Berson termed involution, as a means of moving human society forwards. Reviewers found the book by turns stimulating and puzzling, and more aphoristic than analytical.

The Fourth Dimensional Reaches of the Exposition (1915) is an idiosyncratic appreciation of the 1915 Pan-Pacific International Exposition in San Francisco that uses the fourth dimension as a metaphor for the exposition's ability to transport the viewer out of ordinary life. This book includes an early use of the word 'hyperspace' in its modern sense of a portal into another dimension. There are several full-page etchings of exposition sites by the artist Gertrude Partington Albright.

As If (1914) is a piece of speculative fiction concerning two transdimensional beings named Diocles and Agnesi. As with such earlier speculative works as Jonathan Swift's Gulliver's Travels, Williams' primary purpose is to deliver a critique of her own world by allowing us to see it through the eyes of nonhumans. As the novel opens, a telegraph operator named Clarence Barston has intercepted a series of letters between Diocles and his wife Agnesi. In this correspondence, Diocles is reporting on Earth and its curious inhabitants, commenting, for example, on the strangeness of existence in three dimensions compared to their own ten-dimensional universe. As their separation continues, it appears that Diocles and Agnesi are not receiving each other's letters, but they continue their correspondence nonetheless. The first half of the book ends with Diocles about to enter an eleventh dimension. The second half of the book consists of Agnesi's account of what happens to her after she is somehow ejected from the ten-dimensional universe. She suddenly finds herself trapped inside a new "outer self", a woman named Mary James who is writing a novel about a character named Agnesi. This section of the book is narrated in Agnesi's voice as she tries to communicate with Mary and come to terms with her new situation. Mary is a schoolteacher, and the trapped Agnesi is horrified to find her classroom occupied by "a great beast of indefinite outline and motley color resembling a dragon" instead of children. Williams uses this dragon metaphor as the basis for an extended critique of secondary school educational methods. Towards the end of the book, Mary shows her superior at the school, Professor Passihof, her novel-in-progress, and he reciprocates by showing her something he had written many years earlier— which turns out to be the very letters of Diocles with which As If opens. The book closes with Passihof and Mary recognizing each other as Diocles and Agnesi, finally reunited in the eleventh dimension.

== Publications ==
- As If: A Philosophical Phantasy (1914)
- The Fourth Dimensional Reaches of the Exposition (1915)
- Creative Involution (1916; introduction by Edwin Markham)
- Adding a New Dimension to Education (1928)
