= Thousand Oaks, Berkeley, California =

Neighborhood in Berkeley, California, USA

Coordinates: 37°53′44″N 122°16′46″W

Thousand Oaks is a neighborhood of Berkeley in Alameda County, California. Located at the base of the Berkeley Hills, it lies at an elevation of 239 feet (73 m).

The principal shopping area is Solano Avenue, along the southern edge of the neighborhood. There are also two smaller clusters of shops on the northern edge of Thousand Oaks, across the county line in Kensington on Arlington Avenue and on Colusa Avenue. The neighborhood is primarily residential, mostly consisting of single-family houses built in the early 20th century, sometimes with in-law apartments, as well as a handful of apartment buildings.

When the neighboring city of Albany was incorporated in 1908, its borders were drawn to exclude the area north of Solano Avenue and east of Curtis Street that would become the Thousand Oaks area, then the site of a refugee camp that had formed after the 1906 earthquake. Its residents were employed in the construction of the surrounding subdivisions and were likely to vote against incorporation as a separate city. The neighborhood was first subdivided in 1909 and 1917 after a failed proposal to move the state capital to Berkeley, in which the area would have become a large public park near the capitol building. Originally an unincorporated area north of Berkeley, it was built as a commuter suburb at the northern terminus of three interurban rail lines. It includes the Thousand Oaks Knoll, a rocky extension of the Berkeley hills in the northeastern part of the neighborhood. Several large rock outcroppings in the eastern edge of the neighborhood were turned into public parks, or incorporated into private yards.

== See also ==
- Albany, California
- Cerrito Creek
- Indian Rock Park
- Mark Daniels
