= Kevin Jenkins (politician) =

American politician

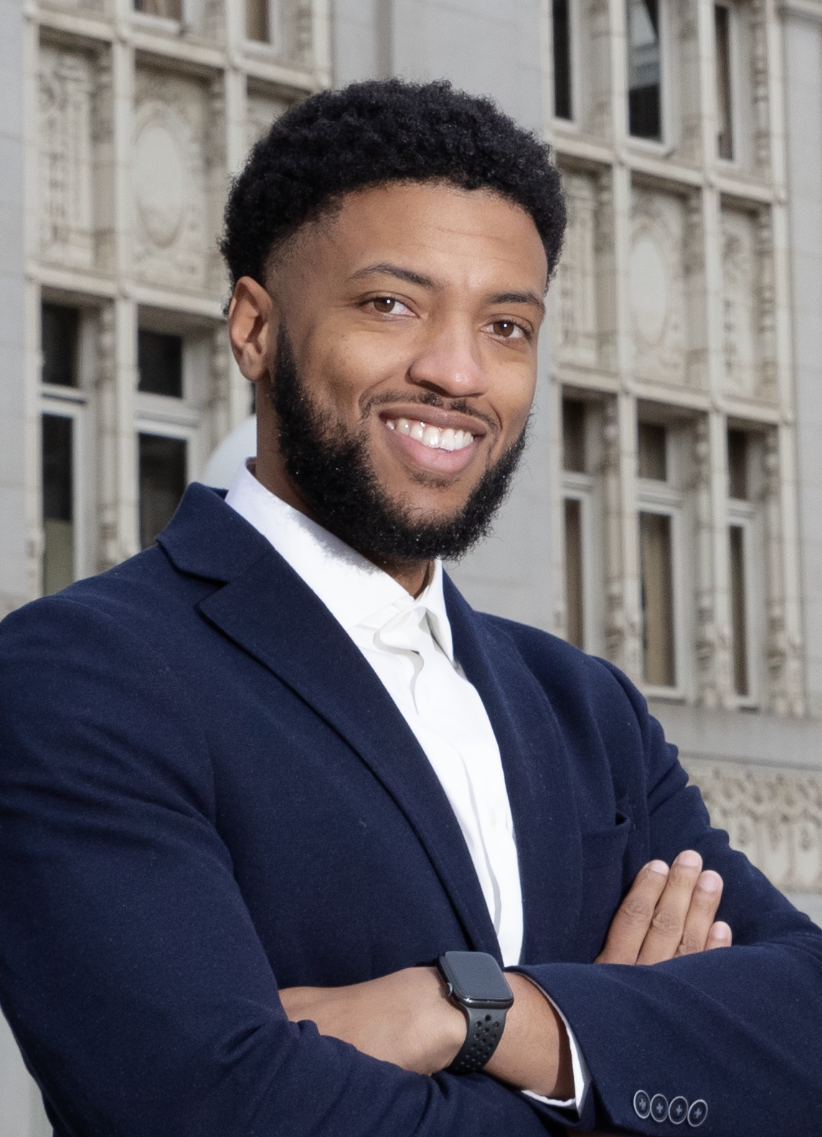
- Jenkins in 2023

Member of the Oakland City Council from the 6th district
- Incumbent
- Assumed office January 2, 2023
- Preceded by: Loren Taylor

Interim Mayor of Oakland
- In office January 6, 2025 – May 20, 2025
- Preceded by: Sheng Thao; Nikki Fortunato Bas (interim)
- Succeeded by: Barbara Lee

Personal details
- Born: August 20, 1987 (age 39) Oakland, California, U.S.
- Party: Democratic
- Children: 1
- Education: Laney College; College of Alameda; San Francisco State University (BA); California State University, East Bay (MPA)
- Website: City council website

Kevin Jenkins (born August 20, 1987) is an American politician who is a member of the Oakland City Council as the city council member from the 6th district. He served as the interim mayor of Oakland, California for a period in 2025, following the resignation of prior interim mayor Nikki Fortunato Bas to serve as a member of the Alameda County Board of Supervisors. He currently serves as the City Council president.

== Early life and education ==
Jenkins was born in Oakland on August 20, 1987 to parents who worked with the Oakland Unified School District. Raised in East Oakland, he graduated from Oakland High School and would later attend Laney College and the College of Alameda. He transferred to San Francisco State University where he would graduate with a degree in Urban Studies and Planning. He went on to earn a Master of Public Administration (MPA) from California State University, East Bay (CSU East Bay).

He was elected to the Peralta Community College District Board of Trustees, representing Area 2. He also served as a commissioner with the Alameda County Public Health Commission, as well as the president of the California Association of Black School Educators. At the time of his election to city council in 2022, Jenkins was the director of housing justice initiatives with the regional branch of United Way. Jenkins has one child, a son.

== Political career ==
Jenkins was elected to become an Oakland City Council member from the 6th district in 2022, succeeding Loren Taylor. He ran on a platform to address gun violence, combat illegal dumping, to build more affordable housing, and reduce homelessness. As a city councilman, he has been a proponent of using high-tech cameras, such as automated license plate readers, in order to arrest suspects.

In 2025, after the resignation of Fortunato Bas due to her becoming a member of the Alameda County Board of Supervisors, Jenkins was elected by members of the council to serve both as interim mayor and as council president. He appointed LaNiece Jones and Burt Jones to serve as deputy mayors during his mayoralty.

During his term as interim mayor, he fired chief of staff Leigh Hanson after she was accused of racism due to her having written notes during a 2024 meeting, in the midst of former mayor Sheng Thao's recall election, describing Black people as "tokens". This would be followed by Jenkins firing most of the remaining staff from Thao's administration. Thao has been criminally indicted by a grand jury on federal bribery charges.

Jenkins declined to run for the special election that took place on April 15, 2025. He endorsed former U.S. representative Barbara Lee for the mayoral race, who later won the election. He was succeeded by Lee on May 20.

Political offices
Preceded by Nikki Fortunato Bas; Acting	Mayor of Oakland; Acting; 2025	Succeeded by Barbara Lee
