= 2025 Oakland mayoral special election =

Local election in California, US

- April 15, 2025
- Turnout: 37.90%
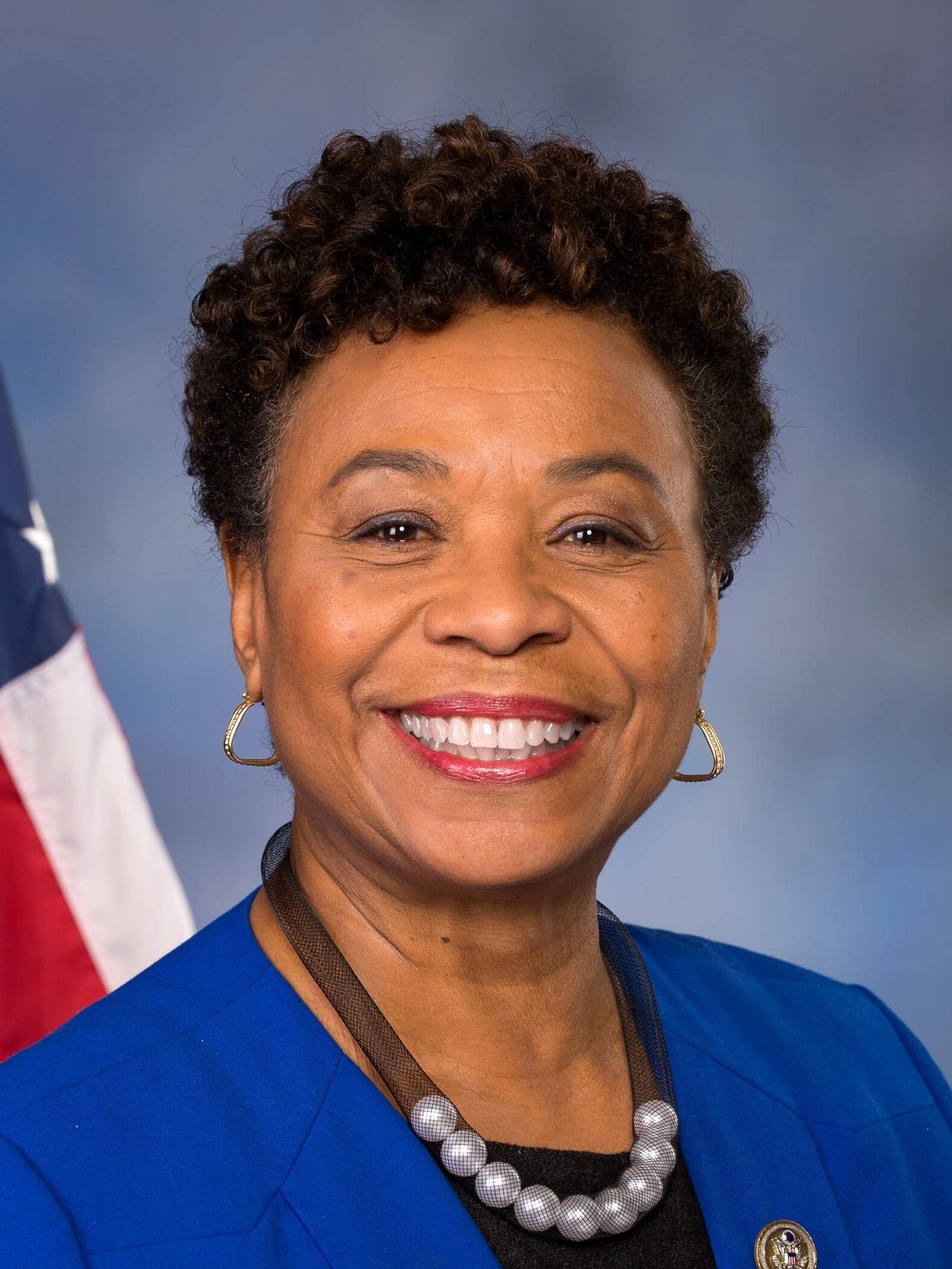

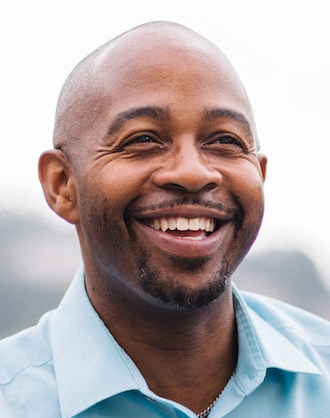
Candidate	Barbara Lee	Loren Taylor
First round	47,122; 50.06%	42,342; 44.98%
Final round	48,935; 52.70%	43,929; 47.30%
- First round precinct results Lee: 40–50% 50–60% 60–70% Taylor: 40–50% 50–60% 60–70% 70–80% Simpson: 90–100% Tie: 40–50% 50% No votes
Mayor before election
Kevin Jenkins (interim)
Elected mayor
Barbara Lee

The 2025 Oakland mayoral special election was held on April 15, 2025, to elect the next mayor of Oakland, California, following the recall of mayor Sheng Thao in November 2024.

City Council president Nikki Fortunato Bas served as interim mayor until January 6, 2025, when she resigned to take a seat on the Alameda County Board of Supervisors. Fellow city councilor Kevin Jenkins then took over as interim mayor. The filing period for mayoral candidates lasted from December 23, 2024, to January 17, 2025. The winner of this election will complete Thao's current term and will be up for re-election in 2026. The election used ranked-choice voting.

Multiple media and news organizations called the race for Barbara Lee on April 18, three days after the election. While Lee carried the majority of the city's neighborhoods, Loren Taylor outperformed in the Oakland Hills, which the San Francisco Chronicle described as "Oakland’s whitest, wealthiest and most economically conservative" neighborhoods, and which also had the highest turnout rate in the election.

== Candidates ==
=== Declared ===
- President Cristina Grappo, provider and candidate for U.S. Senate in 2016
- Barbara Lee, former U.S. representative from California's 12th congressional district and candidate for U.S. Senate in 2024
- Peter Liu, entrepreneur and perennial candidate
- Mindy Pechenuk, economist and perennial candidate
- Suz Robinson, vice president of the Bay Area Council
- Eric Simpson, factory worker
- Elizabeth Swaney, former finance director for Spinsters of San Francisco and candidate for governor in 2003
- Loren Taylor, former city councilor for the 6th district and runner-up for mayor in 2022
- Renia Webb, former chief of staff for then-mayor Sheng Thao

=== Withdrawn ===
- Tyron Jordan, former member of the Oakland Library Advisory Commission and candidate for mayor in 2022 (endorsed Lee, remained on ballot)

=== Declined ===
- Kevin Jenkins, interim mayor (endorsed Lee)
- Janani Ramachandran, city councilor for the 4th district

== Endorsements ==
Barbara Lee

Federal officials

- Lateefah Simon, U.S. representative from California's 12th congressional district (2025–present)

Statewide officials

- Jerry Brown, former governor of California (1975–1983, 2011–2019) and former mayor of Oakland (1999–2007)

State legislators

- Jesse Arreguín, state senator from the 7th district (2024–present) and former mayor of Berkeley (2016–2024)
- Mia Bonta, state assemblymember from the 18th district (2021–present)
- Buffy Wicks, state assemblymember from the 14th district (2018–present)

Municipal officials

- 7/8 members of the Oakland City Council
- 5/7 members of the Oakland Unified Board of Education
- Nikki Fortunato Bas, Alameda County supervisor from the 5th district (2025–present) and former acting mayor of Oakland (2024–2025)
- Elihu Harris, former mayor of Oakland (1991–1999)
- Kevin Jenkins, acting mayor of Oakland (2025–present)
- Jean Quan, former mayor of Oakland (2011–2015)
- Libby Schaaf, former mayor of Oakland (2015–2023)

Individuals

- W. Kamau Bell, stand-up comic and television host
- E-40, rapper and actor
- Mistah F.A.B, rapper
- Corrina Gould, indigenous activist
- Sheryl Lee Ralph, actress and singer

Labor unions

- Alameda AFL-CIO
- Building & Construction Trades Council of Alameda County
- International Association of Fire Fighters Local 155
- International Federation of Professional and Technical Engineers Local 21
- National Union of Healthcare Workers
- Oakland Education Association
- Service Employees International Union Local 102

Organizations

- EMILY's List
- Harvey Milk LGBTQ Democratic Club
- Our Revolution

Newspapers and publications

- Bay Area Reporter
- East Bay Times
- Oakland Post

Political parties

- Alameda County Democratic Party
Mindy Pechenuk

State legislators

- Leticia Castillo, state assemblymember from the 58th district (2024–present)
- Mike Morrell, former state senator from the 23rd district (2014–2020)

Political parties

- Alameda County Republican Party
Eric Simpson

Political parties

- Socialist Workers Party
Loren Taylor

State legislators

- Don Perata, former state senator from the 9th district (1998–2008)

Municipal officials

- LeRonne Armstrong, former chief of the Oakland Police Department (2021–2023)
- John Bauters, former mayor of Emeryville (2017–2018, 2021–2023)
- Ignacio De La Fuente, former vice mayor of Oakland (2009–2011) from the 5th district (1992–2013) and former mayoral candidate in 1998, 2006, and 2022
- Brenda Harbin-Forte, former Alameda County Superior Court judge (1998–2019)
- Matt Mahan, mayor of San Jose (2023–present)
- Patricia Kernighan, former Oakland City Councilor from the 2nd district (2005–2014)

Individuals

- Garry Tan, CEO of Y Combinator

Newspapers and publications

- San Francisco Chronicle
Renia Webb

Individuals

- Shannon Watts, founder of Moms Demand Action
Declined to endorse

Organizations

- East Bay Young Democrats

== Results ==
After nine rounds of ranked-choice tabulation, Barbara Lee led Loren Taylor by over 5,000 votes. Taylor conceded the race on Saturday, April 19.

2025 Oakland mayoral special election, May 2, 2025
Candidate	Round 1		Round 2		Round 3		Round 4		Round 5		Round 6		Round 7		Round 8		Round 9
Candidate	Votes %	Transfer	Votes %	Transfer	Votes %	Transfer	Votes %	Transfer	Votes %	Transfer	Votes %	Transfer	Votes %	Transfer	Votes %	Transfer	Votes %
Barbara Lee	47,177; 50.03%	+17	47,194; 50.07%	+66	47,260; 50.16%	+59	47,319; 50.25%	+245	47,564; 50.56%	+276	47,840; 50.92%	+83	47,923; 51.17%	+424	48,347; 51.75%	+588	48,935; 52.70%
Loren Taylor	42,393; 44.95%	+43	42,436; 45.02%	+32	42,468; 45.07%	+66	42,534; 45.17%	+94	42,628; 45.32%	+264	42,892; 45.65%	+366	43,258; 46.19%	+292	43,550; 46.61%	+379	43,929; 47.30%
Tyron Jordan (withdrawn)	1,001; 1.06%	+18	1,019; 1.08%	+23	1,042; 1.11%	+22	1,064; 1.13%	+53	1,117; 1.19%	+46	1,163; 1.24%	+124	1,287; 1.37%	+245	1,532; 1.64%	-1,532	Eliminated
Renia Webb	796; 0.84%	+10	806; 0.86%	+23	829; 0.88%	+47	876; 0.93%	+53	929; 0.99%	+106	1,035; 1.10%	+145	1,180; 1.26%	-1,180	Eliminated		
Mindy Pechenuk	834; 0.88%	+8	842; 0.89%	+24	866; 0.92%	+32	898; 0.95%	+72	970; 1.03%	+52	1,022; 1.09%	-1,022	Eliminated				
Suz Robinson	755; 0.80%	+14	769; 0.82%	+15	784; 0.83%	+35	819; 0.87%	+39	858; 0.91%	-858	Eliminated						
Eric Simpson	588; 0.62%	+5	593; 0.63%	+14	607; 0.64%	+51	658; 0.70%	-658	Eliminated								
Elizabeth Swaney	324; 0.34%	+9	333; 0.35%	+32	365; 0.39%	-365	Eliminated										
Peter Liu	253; 0.27%	+13	266; 0.28%	-266	Eliminated												
Cristina Grappo	184; 0.20%	-184	Eliminated														
Total active ballots	94,305		94,258		94,221		94,168		94,066		93,952		93,648		93,429		92,864
Exhausted ballots		+45	45	+33	78	+48	126	+99	225	+110	335	+299	634	+214	848	+530	1,378
