= 2026 Oakland mayoral election =

Local election in California, US

- November 3, 2026
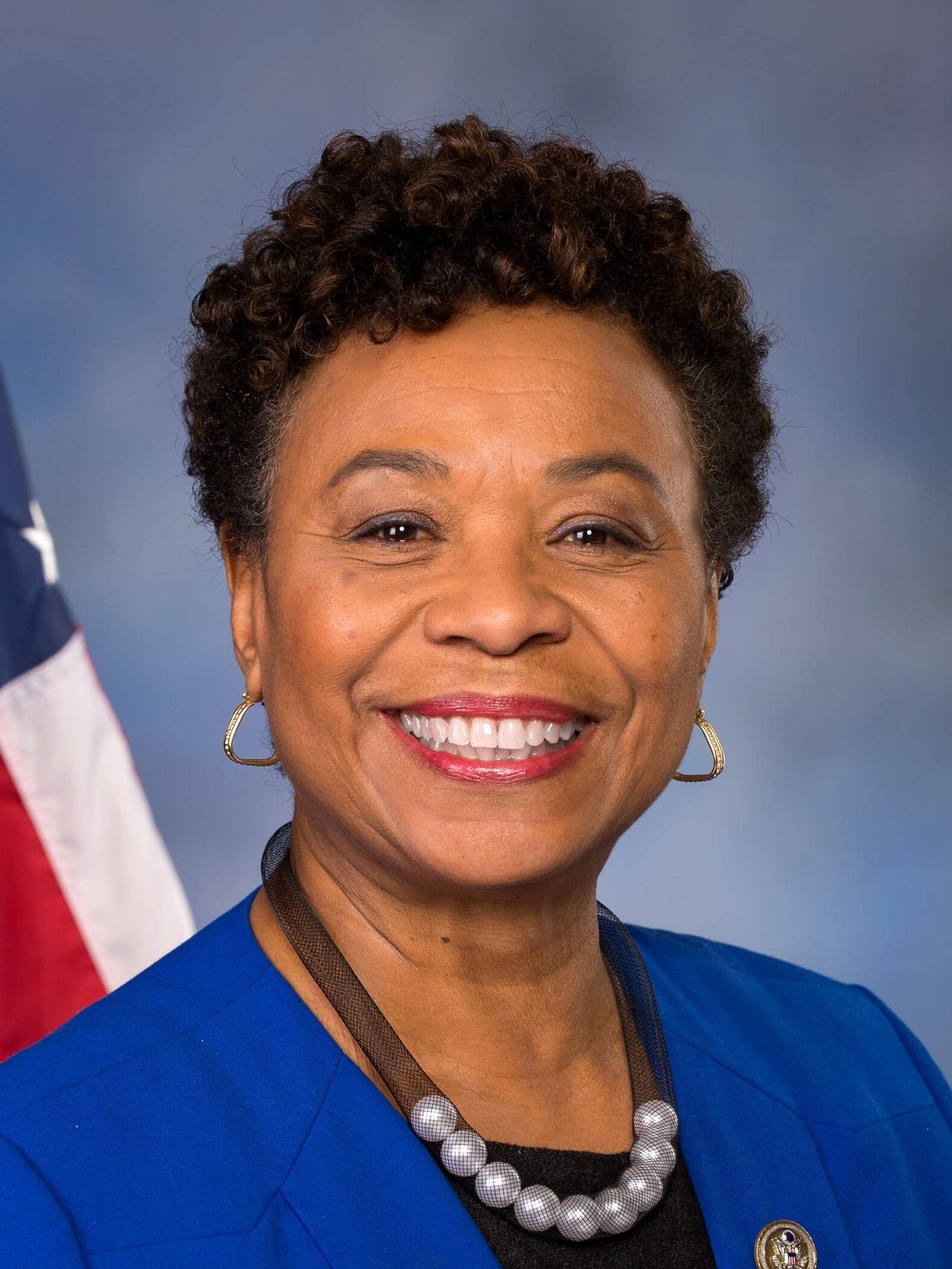

Candidate	Barbara Lee	Julius Robinson
Party	Nonpartisan	Nonpartisan
Popular vote	122,407	8,721
Percentage	85.18%	6.07%
Mayor before election
Barbara Lee
Elected mayor
Barbara Lee

The 2026 Oakland mayoral election was held on November 3, 2026, to elect the mayor of Oakland, California. Incumbent mayor Barbara Lee won re-election for the first full term after winning a 2025 special election.

== Candidates ==
=== Declared ===
- Brenda Grisham, community advocate
- Barbara Lee, incumbent mayor
- Mindy Pechenuk, educator, economist, and activist
- Julius Robinson, banking executive and community development leader

== Endorsements ==
Barbara Lee

Executive branch officials

- Kamala Harris, former vice president of the United States (2021–2025)

U.S. representatives

- Lateefah Simon, CA-12 (2025–present)

State legislators

- Jesse Arreguín, SD-07 (2024–present)
- Mia Bonta, AD-18 (2021–present)
- Buffy Wicks, AD-14 (2018–present)

== Results ==
2026 Oakland mayoral election
Candidate	Votes	%
Barbara Lee (incumbent)	122,407	85.18
Julius Robinson	8,721	6.07
Mindy Pechenuk	6,647	4.63
Brenda Grisham	5,934	4.13
Total votes	143,709	100.00
