= Loren Taylor =

American politician (born 1977)

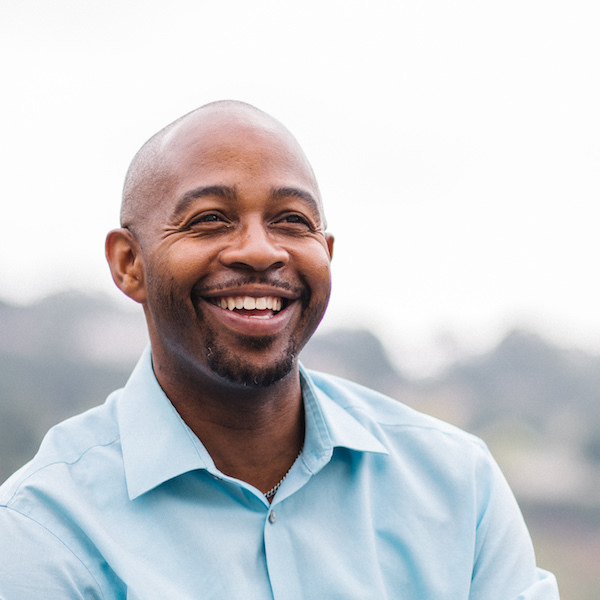
- Taylor in 2019

Member of the Oakland City Council from the 6th district
- In office January 7, 2019 – January 2, 2023
- Preceded by: Desley Brooks
- Succeeded by: Kevin Jenkins

Personal details
- Born: Loren Manuel Taylor; July 26, 1977 (age 49) Oakland, California, U.S.
- Party: Democratic
- Education: Case Western Reserve University (BA); University of Connecticut (MS); University of California, Berkeley (MBA)
- Website: Campaign website

Loren Manuel Taylor (born July 26, 1977) is an American politician who served a member of the Oakland City Council from the 6th district from 2019 to 2023. A member of the Democratic Party, he ran for mayor of Oakland in 2022, narrowly losing by 0.6% to fellow city councilmember Sheng Thao. Following Thao's recall and subsequent indictment, he ran again for mayor of Oakland in the 2025 special election to replace her. He lost by a margin of 5.4% to former congresswoman Barbara Lee.

== Early life, education, and career ==
Taylor was born and raised in Oakland, California. A third-generation resident of Oakland, he attended Oakland public schools and graduated from The College Preparatory School in 1995. He earned a bachelor of arts from Case Western Reserve University, a master of science in biomedical engineering from the University of Connecticut, and a master of business administration from the University of California, Berkeley.

Prior to his political involvement, Taylor was a biomedical engineer and management consultant for businesses and nonprofit organizations. His community involvement included serving as a board member of the 100 Black Men of the Bay Area and the West Oakland Health Center.

== Political career ==
=== Oakland City Council ===
Taylor first ran for Oakland City Council in 2018, defeating 4-term incumbent Desley Brooks with 64.3% of the vote after five rounds of ranked choice voting. He represented the 6th district, which included the East Oakland neighborhoods of Maxwell Park, Millsmont, Havenscourt, and Eastmont.

As a city councilmember, Taylor focused on homelessness and economic development. In response to the 68% increase in Oakland's unhoused population, and the explosion of encampments in the city, he partnered with other councilmembers to enact the Permanent Access to Housing (PATH) plan, which sought to close the racial disparities of homelessness. He voted for the creation of a new homeless encampment management policy that would designate high and low sensitivity areas and allow unhoused individuals to camp in low sensitivity areas. He also worked with the Black Cultural Zone, a community development corporation consisting of 20 Oakland-based nonprofits, to establish the Akoma Outdoor Market, one of several programs it runs on a city-owned lot in East Oakland.

Taylor also helped secure funding from Google in a public-private partnership with the City of Oakland to build a new commercial kitchen for aspiring restauranteurs at the Arroyo Viejo Recreation Center in East Oakland and recruited students at the Haas School of Business to advise and partner with Oakland entrepreneurs and small business owners.

Taylor served on the City Council for one term, declining to run for re-election to run for mayor of Oakland in 2022, which he narrowly lost to Sheng Thao. He was replaced by Kevin Jenkins, who became interim mayor following Thao's recall in 2024. After leaving office, founded Empower Oakland, an advocacy organization focused on educating and engaging Oakland residents on local issues.

=== 2025 Oakland mayoral campaign ===
Thao was recalled in 2024 amid a corruption scandal that led to her indictment on federal bribery charges in January 2025. Following this, Taylor announced his candidacy in the special election to replace her, joining a field of eight other candidates, including former Congresswoman Barbara Lee. He is running on a platform focused on public safety, budget reform, and homelessness.

On the campaign trail, Taylor called for funding three academies a year to bring the police department up to 800 officers within three years and investing in more technology, including license plate readers, drones and voice recognition. With respect to the city budget, he has said the city must make “tough, hard, necessary choices” to balance revenue with expenses and believes the city needs to refinance its debt and reevaluate its pension liabilities. He also believes solving homelessness means getting people housed and that he will prioritize fully implementing Oakland's encampment management policy.

Initial results showed Taylor earning over 51% percent of the vote in the second ballot after the Oakland mayoral election was held on April 15, 2025. However, the election would be called in Lee's favor after the results shifted on April 18.

== Personal life ==
Taylor lives in East Oakland with his wife, Dr. Erica Taylor. They have two children together.
