= Elizabeth Swaney =

Hungarian-American freestyle skier (born 1984)

Elizabeth Swaney OLY
Personal information
- Full name: Elizabeth Marian Swaney
- Nationality: American
- Born: 30 July 1984 (age 42) Oakland, California

Sport
- Country: Hungary
- Sport: Freestyle skiing
- Event: Halfpipe

Elizabeth Marian Swaney (born 30 July 1984) is an American athlete who competed for Hungary in the 2018 Winter Olympics in the women's halfpipe. She placed last in her sole event at the Olympics, drawing media attention and controversy both for the procedure that she used to qualify for the Games and for the apparent lack of effort in her runs.

== Early life and education ==
Born on 30 July 1984, Swaney grew up in a bilingual Spanish–English household in the Oakland Rockridge neighborhood, and attended high school in Lafayette.

In high school, she rowed for the Oakland Strokes. She graduated from the University of California, Berkeley in 2007. While a student, she briefly launched a campaign for Governor of California. She then earned a master's degree from Harvard University in design studies with a focus on real estate. While at Harvard, she volunteered as the assistant coach for their Track and Field team.

== Athletic career ==
While at the University of California, Berkeley, Swaney was a coxswain and the only woman on the championship Division I Men's Crew/Rowing team and a Pac-10 Second Team All-American. Having had Olympic ambitions since childhood, she sought to compete in bobsleigh as a pilot for the United States, but was told she was too small to be competitive in the sport.

She then turned to skeleton, in which she competed internationally, and freestyle skiing, in which she sought to represent Venezuela, her mother's homeland, at the 2014 Winter Olympics. She started skiing for Hungary in 2015, based on her grandparents' country of birth.

=== Olympic qualifying ===
Swaney qualified for the 2018 Winter Olympics representing Hungary in half-pipe skiing. Beginning in 2013 she attended all the World Cup qualifying events over the two Olympic qualifying years, and the 2017 World Championship in Sierra Nevada, Spain. In order to qualify for the Olympics, athletes needed to place in the top 30 at either a FIS Freestyle Ski World Cup event or FIS Freestyle World Ski Championships, and score a minimum of 50.00 FIS points. Swaney achieved this by attending competitions with fewer than thirty participants, with one event in China having fifteen (in which she placed thirteenth). Thirteen of her top 30 finishes were a result of her showing up, not falling, and recording a score.

As a result of Swaney's selection of competitions, she was ranked 34th in her run up to the Olympics. The Olympic quota system also aided in her qualifying. While 24 women were able to compete in half-pipe competition, there are limits on the number of skiers each country could send. The maximum a country could send was twenty-six (with maximums of fourteen men and fourteen women) across all freestyle skiing events.

As a result, only four of the six women ranked within the top 20 in the world in halfpipe skiing were allowed to represent the United States in the Olympics based on the quota system. Between the quota system and injuries, Swaney's ranking of 34 granted her qualification for the Olympics.

=== 2018 Olympics ===
At the 2018 Winter Olympics, Swaney competed in the women's half-pipe, scoring 30.00 and 31.40, without using tricks in either of her two runs. She placed last in the competition, 13.60 points behind Laila Friis-Salling of Denmark, who had fallen in both of her qualifying runs. The incident prompted the Hungarian Olympic Committee (MOB) to reevaluate its selection process, and possible changes to the quota system. As of 2021, no changes have been made to the FIS freestyle ski selection process in halfpipe skiing.

Swaney's performance was considered polarizing, with CBS Sports writing that she scammed her way into the Olympics and calling her "mind-numbingly average." However, Swaney received support from a number of Olympians, including gold medalist Maddie Bowman, double gold medalist David Wise, and Canadian gold medalist Cassie Sharpe, who said, "If you are going to put in the time and effort to be here, then you deserve to be here as much as I do."

== Personal and professional life ==
Swaney has worked as a technical recruiter for the website Thumbtack, as a barista, and as a stand-up comedian and producing tech pitch roast comedy shows. She is certified as a skiing instructor and a weightlifting coach. She competed in qualifiers for American Ninja Warrior in 2018. In 2022, she was the finance director for Spinsters of San Francisco.

Swaney ran for mayor of Oakland in the 2025 special election. She finished eighth, with 0.39% of the vote.

== See also ==
- Eddie the Eagle – British ski jumper (born 1963)
- Eric the Eel, swimmer
- Rachael Gunn – Australian breakdancer (born 1987)
- List of uncompetitive athletes
