= 2002 Oakland mayoral election =

Oakland mayoral election, 2002
- March 5, 2002
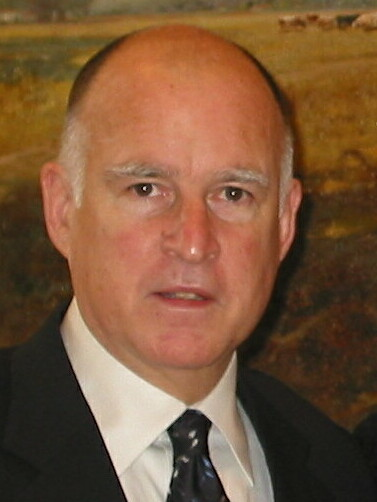

Candidate	Jerry Brown	Wilson Riles Jr.
Party	Democratic	Nonpartisan
Popular vote	42,892	24,611
Percentage	63.5%	36.4%
Mayor before election
Jerry Brown
Democratic
Elected mayor
Jerry Brown
Democratic

The 2002 Oakland mayoral election was held on March 5, 2002, to elect the mayor of Oakland, California. It saw the reelection of incumbent mayor Jerry Brown.

== Campaign ==
Former Oakland City Council member Wilson Riles Jr., who had served on the City Council from 1979 until 1992, challenged incumbent first-term mayor Jerry Brown.

Brown ran a low-profile campaign. He had $200,000 in campaign funds, more than twice what Riles had.

While the previous election had attracted national media attention, very little media coverage was paid to the 2002 race.

A chief critique of Brown made by Riles was that the incumbent mayor was too cozy with downtown developers.

Riles, ultimately, performed stronger than had been anticipated by many.

Brown was also campaigning in support of ballot measure that would permanently extend 1998's Measure X, which had implemented a six-year period in which Oakland would be run under the strong mayor form of governance. Measure X's change from a weak mayor to strong mayor form of governance would expire during the coming mayoral term. However, the measure to permanently extend Measure X ultimately failed in 2002. A similar measure which permanently extended the Measure X changes, however, would successfully be approved by voters in 2004, thus permentantly keeping they changes made by Measure X.

== Results ==
Results
Candidate	Votes	%
Jerry Brown (incumbent)	42,892	63.5
Wilson Riles Jr.	24,611	36.4
