= List of mayors of Oakland, California =

Mayor of Oakland, California
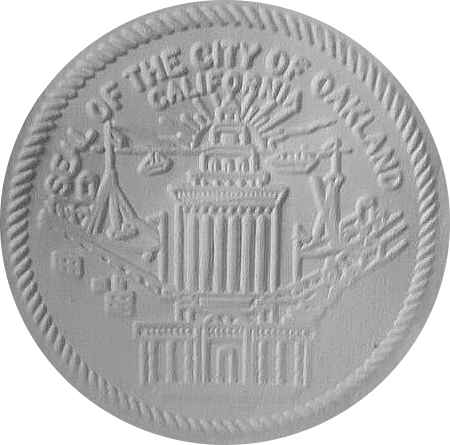
- Seal of Oakland

- Flag of Oakland

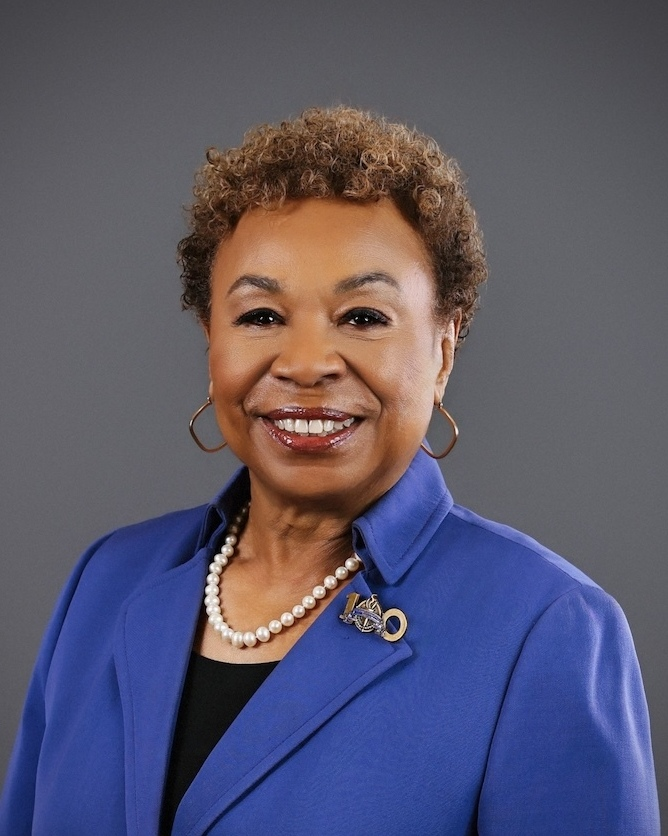
- Incumbent; Barbara Lee since May 20, 2025
- Type: Mayor
- Term length: Four-year term, renewable once
- Formation: April 17, 1854
- First holder: Horace W. Carpentier
- Deputy: Rebecca Kaplan (Vice Mayor)

The city of Oakland, California, was founded in 1852 and incorporated in 1854. The city uses a strong mayor form of government. Until the early 20th century, all Oakland mayors served terms of only one or two years each. Oakland mayors now serve 4-year terms and are limited to two terms.

Barbara Lee has served as mayor of Oakland since 2025.

== Terms ==
- Office terms:
  - 1 year 1854 – mayor elected by fellow city council members
  - 2 years 1893 – mayor elected by fellow city council members
  - 4 years 1953 – mayor elected by popular vote

== List of mayors ==
Denotes an interim mayor

No.	Mayor	Took office	Left office	Tenure	Election	Party
1	Horace Carpentier (1824–1918)	April 17, 1854	March 5, 1855	322 days	1854	Unknown
2	Charles Campbell (c. 1838–1890)	March 5, 1855	March 5, 1855	0 days	TBA	Unknown
3	Samuel H. Robinson (TBA–TBA)	March 5, 1855	March 2, 1857	1 year, 362 days	1855	Unknown
3	Samuel H. Robinson (TBA–TBA)	March 5, 1855	March 2, 1857	1 year, 362 days	1856	Unknown
4	Andrew Williams (c. 1800–1876)	March 2, 1857	March 7, 1859	2 years, 5 days	1857	Unknown
4	Andrew Williams (c. 1800–1876)	March 2, 1857	March 7, 1859	2 years, 5 days	1858	Unknown
5	Francis K. Shattuck (1824–1898)	March 7, 1859	March 7, 1860	1 year, 0 days	1859	Republican
6	James Paine Miller Davis (1817–1864)	March 7, 1860	March 5, 1862	1 year, 363 days	1860	Democratic
6	James Paine Miller Davis (1817–1864)	March 7, 1860	March 5, 1862	1 year, 363 days	1861	Democratic
7	George M. Blake (?–1875)	March 5, 1862	March 1863	1 year	1862	Unknown
8	William Henry Bovee (1823–1894)	March 1863	March 14, 1864	1 year	1863	Unknown
9	Edward Gibbons (1816–1886)	March 14, 1864	March 6, 1865	357 days	1864	Unknown
10	Benjamin F. Ferris (?–1876)	March 6, 1865	March 5, 1866	364 days	1865	Unknown
11	John W. Dwinelle (1816–1881)	March 5, 1866	March 7, 1867	1 year, 2 days	1866	Unknown
12	William Watrus Crane Jr. (1831–1883)	March 7, 1867	November 2, 1867 (Note: Crane resigned from office.)	240 days	1867	Unknown
13	Samuel Merritt (1822–1890)	November 3, 1867	March 1, 1869	1 year, 118 days	App.	Unknown
13	Samuel Merritt (1822–1890)	November 3, 1867	March 1, 1869	1 year, 118 days	1868	Unknown
14	John B. Felton (1827–1877)	March 1, 1869	March 5, 1870	1 year, 4 days	1869	Republican
Unknown (Note: No data exists for whom was mayor during this time period.)		March 5, 1870	March 1, 1871			
15	Nathan Weston Spaulding (1829–1903)	March 1, 1871	March 4, 1873	2 years, 3 days	1871	Republican
15	Nathan Weston Spaulding (1829–1903)	March 1, 1871	March 4, 1873	2 years, 3 days	1872	Republican
16	Henry Durant (1802–1875)	March 4, 1873	January 22, 1875 (Note: Died in office.)	1 year, 324 days	1873	Unknown
16	Henry Durant (1802–1875)	March 4, 1873	January 22, 1875	1 year, 324 days	1874	Unknown
Vacant		January 22, 1875	February 1, 1875			
17	Mack Webber (c. 1834–1901)	February 1, 1875	March 13, 1876	1 year, 41 days	App.	Unknown
17	Mack Webber (c. 1834–1901)	February 1, 1875	March 13, 1876	1 year, 41 days	1875	Unknown
18	Enoch H. Pardee (1829–1896)	March 13, 1876	March 25, 1878	2 years, 12 days	1876	Republican
18	Enoch H. Pardee (1829–1896)	March 13, 1876	March 25, 1878	2 years, 12 days	1877	Republican
19	Washburne R. Andrus (1841–1895)	March 25, 1878	March 8, 1880	1 year, 349 days	1878	Workingmen's
19	Washburne R. Andrus (1841–1895)	March 25, 1878	March 8, 1880	1 year, 349 days	1879	Workingmen's
20	James E. Blethen (1828–1909)	March 8, 1880	March 13, 1882	2 years, 5 days	1880	Republican
20	James E. Blethen (1828–1909)	March 8, 1880	March 13, 1882	2 years, 5 days	1881	Republican
21	Charles K. Robinson (1835–1887)	March 13, 1882	March 12, 1883	364 days	1882	Republican
22	J. West Martin (1822–1899)	March 12, 1883	March 10, 1884	364 days	1883	Democratic
23	Ashmun Cooke Henry (1828–1907)	March 10, 1884	March 9, 1885	364 days	1884	Republican
24	Eli W. Playter (1819–1893)	March 9, 1885	March 14, 1887	2 years, 5 days	1885	Republican
24	Eli W. Playter (1819–1893)	March 9, 1885	March 14, 1887	2 years, 5 days	1886	Republican
25	William R. Davis (1850–1915)	March 14, 1887	March 12, 1888	364 days	1887	Republican
26	Charles D. Pierce (1859–1909)	March 12, 1888	March 11, 1889	364 days	1888	Democratic
27	John R. Glascock (1845–1913)	March 11, 1889	March 9, 1891	1 year, 363 days	1889	Democratic (Note: Glascock was endorsed by the Democratic, Independent Republican, and American parties for mayor.)
27	John R. Glascock (1845–1913)	March 11, 1889	March 9, 1891	1 year, 363 days	1890	Democratic
28	Melvin C. Chapman (1852–1936)	March 9, 1891	March 13, 1893	2 years, 4 days	1891	Republican
28	Melvin C. Chapman (1852–1936)	March 9, 1891	March 13, 1893	2 years, 4 days	1892	Republican
29	George Pardee (1857–1941)	March 13, 1893	March 10, 1895	1 year, 362 days	1893	Republican (Note: Pardee was a registered Republican, but ran as the candidate for the Citizen's Municipal League party.)
30	John L. Davie (1850–1934); 1st time	March 10, 1895	March 9, 1897	1 year, 364 days	1895	Populist (Note: Davie was expelled from the Populist Party during his term as mayor, as his pledge to not allow any tax rate above $1 caused all city services to suffer.)
31	William R. Thomas (1842–1930)	March 9, 1897	March 13, 1899	2 years, 4 days	1897	Republican (Note: Endorsed by the Republican and Citizen's Municipal League parties for mayor.)
32	Roland W. Snow (1850–1912)	March 13, 1899	March 11, 1901	1 year, 363 days	1899	Republican
33	Anson Barstow (1831–1906)	March 11, 1901	March 9, 1903	1 year, 363 days	1901	Republican
34	Warren Olney (1841–1921)	March 9, 1903	March 1905	2 years	1903	Fusion (Note: Endorsed by the Democratic, Republican, and Citizen's Municipal League parties for mayor.)
35	Frank K. Mott (1866–1958)	March 1905	July 1, 1915	10 years, 4 months	1905	Fusion
35	Frank K. Mott (1866–1958)	March 1905	July 1, 1915	10 years, 4 months	1907	Fusion
35	Frank K. Mott (1866–1958)	March 1905	July 1, 1915	10 years, 4 months	1909	Fusion
35	Frank K. Mott (1866–1958)	March 1905	July 1, 1915	10 years, 4 months	1911	Fusion
35	Frank K. Mott (1866–1958)	March 1905	July 1, 1915	10 years, 4 months	1912 recall (Note: Survived a recall election.)	Fusion
35	Frank K. Mott (1866–1958)	March 1905	July 1, 1915	10 years, 4 months	1913	Fusion
36	John L. Davie (1850–1934); 2nd time	July 1, 1915	July 1, 1931	16 years, 0 days	1915	Unknown
36	John L. Davie (1850–1934); 2nd time	July 1, 1915	July 1, 1931	16 years, 0 days	1917 recall	Unknown
36	John L. Davie (1850–1934); 2nd time	July 1, 1915	July 1, 1931	16 years, 0 days	1919	Unknown
36	John L. Davie (1850–1934); 2nd time	July 1, 1915	July 1, 1931	16 years, 0 days	1921	Unknown
36	John L. Davie (1850–1934); 2nd time	July 1, 1915	July 1, 1931	16 years, 0 days	1923	Unknown
36	John L. Davie (1850–1934); 2nd time	July 1, 1915	July 1, 1931	16 years, 0 days	1925	Unknown
36	John L. Davie (1850–1934); 2nd time	July 1, 1915	July 1, 1931	16 years, 0 days	1927	Unknown
36	John L. Davie (1850–1934); 2nd time	July 1, 1915	July 1, 1931	16 years, 0 days	1929	Unknown
37	Fred N. Morcom (1874–1955)	July 1, 1931	July 1, 1933	2 years, 0 days	1931	Unknown
38	William J. McCracken (1878–1949)	July 1, 1933	July 1, 1941	8 years, 0 days	1933	Unknown
38	William J. McCracken (1878–1949)	July 1, 1933	July 1, 1941	8 years, 0 days	1935	Unknown
38	William J. McCracken (1878–1949)	July 1, 1933	July 1, 1941	8 years, 0 days	1937	Unknown
38	William J. McCracken (1878–1949)	July 1, 1933	July 1, 1941	8 years, 0 days	1939	Unknown
39	John F. Slavich (1881–1950)	July 1, 1941	July 1, 1945	4 years, 0 days	1941	Unknown
39	John F. Slavich (1881–1950)	July 1, 1941	July 1, 1945	4 years, 0 days	1943	Unknown
40	Herbert L. Beach (1876–1959)	July 1, 1945	July 1, 1947	2 years, 0 days	1945	Unknown
41	Joseph E. Smith (1913–1999)	July 1, 1947	July 1, 1949	2 years, 0 days	1947	Unknown
42	Clifford E. Rishell (1890–1971)	July 1, 1949	July 1, 1961	12 years, 0 days	1949	Republican
42	Clifford E. Rishell (1890–1971)	July 1, 1949	July 1, 1961	12 years, 0 days	1951	Republican
42	Clifford E. Rishell (1890–1971)	July 1, 1949	July 1, 1961	12 years, 0 days	1953	Republican
42	Clifford E. Rishell (1890–1971)	July 1, 1949	July 1, 1961	12 years, 0 days	1957	Republican
43	John C. Houlihan (1910–1986)	July 1, 1961	April 30, 1966 (Note: Houlihan resigned after being charged with embezzlement.)	4 years, 303 days	1961	Republican
43	John C. Houlihan (1910–1986)	July 1, 1961	April 30, 1966	4 years, 303 days	1965	Republican
44	John H. Reading (1917–2003)	May 1, 1966	July 1, 1977	11 years, 61 days	App.	Republican
44	John H. Reading (1917–2003)	May 1, 1966	July 1, 1977	11 years, 61 days	1967 special	Republican
44	John H. Reading (1917–2003)	May 1, 1966	July 1, 1977	11 years, 61 days	1969	Republican
44	John H. Reading (1917–2003)	May 1, 1966	July 1, 1977	11 years, 61 days	1973	Republican
45	Lionel Wilson (1915–1998)	July 1, 1977	January 3, 1991	13 years, 186 days	1977	Democratic
45	Lionel Wilson (1915–1998)	July 1, 1977	January 3, 1991	13 years, 186 days	1981	Democratic
45	Lionel Wilson (1915–1998)	July 1, 1977	January 3, 1991	13 years, 186 days	1985	Democratic
46	Elihu Harris (born 1947)	January 3, 1991	January 4, 1999	8 years, 1 day	1990	Democratic
46	Elihu Harris (born 1947)	January 3, 1991	January 4, 1999	8 years, 1 day	1994	Democratic
47	Jerry Brown (born 1938)	January 4, 1999	January 8, 2007	8 years, 4 days	1998	Democratic
47	Jerry Brown (born 1938)	January 4, 1999	January 8, 2007	8 years, 4 days	2002	Democratic
48	Ron Dellums (1935–2018)	January 8, 2007	January 3, 2011	3 years, 360 days	2006	Democratic
49	Jean Quan (born 1949)	January 3, 2011	January 5, 2015	4 years, 2 days	2010	Democratic
50	Libby Schaaf (born 1965)	January 5, 2015	January 9, 2023	8 years, 4 days	2014	Democratic
50	Libby Schaaf (born 1965)	January 5, 2015	January 9, 2023	8 years, 4 days	2018	Democratic
51	Sheng Thao (born 1985)	January 9, 2023	December 17, 2024 (Note: Thao was recalled after a corruption scandal and later indicted on corruption charges. Following Thao's recall, Nikki Fortunato Bas took office as interim mayor.)	1 year, 343 days	2022	Democratic
–	Nikki Fortunato Bas (born 1968); Interim	December 17, 2024	January 6, 2025 (Note: Fortunato Bas resigned after being elected to the Alameda County Board of Supervisors.)	20 days	2024 recall	Democratic
–	Kevin Jenkins (born 1987); Interim	January 6, 2025	May 20, 2025	134 days	App.	Democratic
52	Barbara Lee (born 1946)	May 20, 2025	Incumbent	1 year, 176 days	2025 special	Democratic
52	Barbara Lee (born 1946)	May 20, 2025	Incumbent	1 year, 176 days	2026	Democratic

== See also ==
- Timeline of Oakland, California
- List of mayors of the 50 largest cities in the United States

== Sources ==
- Conmy, Peter Thomas (1961). The beginnings of Oakland, California, A.U.C. Oakland, Calif.: Oakland Public Library. OCLC 7488215.
- "From then to now: these were mayors". Oakland Tribune. May 1, 1952. p. W-7, Oakland Centennial special edition.Includes photos
- Nicolai, David (2002). Mayors of Oakland: 1854 – 2009:Populists, Visionaries, & Self-Promoters: 47 Oakland Mayors.
- List of mayors, Oakland Public Library
- Biographical Directory of the United States Congress
