= Sheng Thao =

American politician (born 1985)

Sheng Thao 𖬀𖬶𖬤𖬵 𖬒𖬲𖬟𖬰
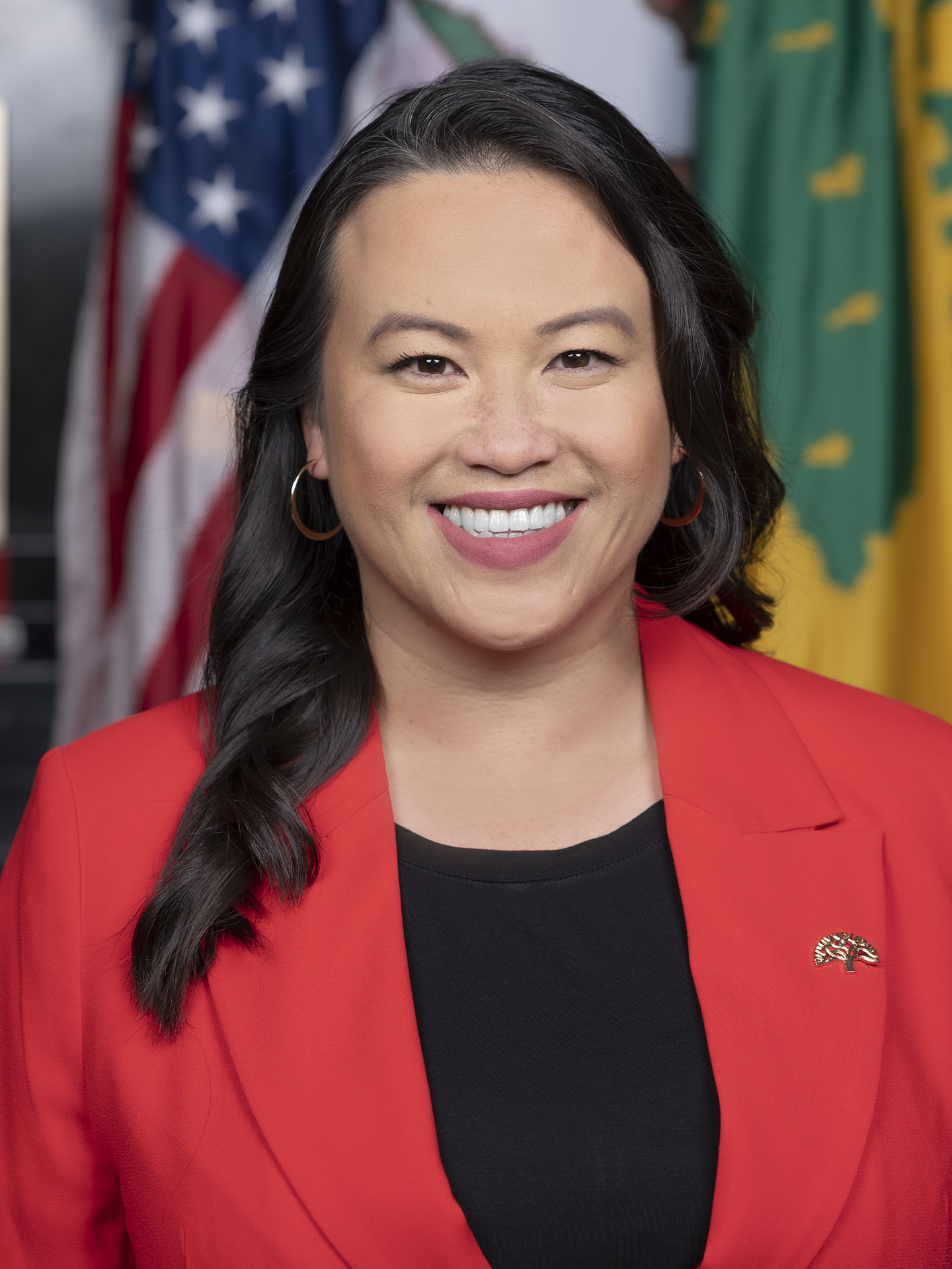
- Official portrait, 2024

51st Mayor of Oakland
- In office January 9, 2023 – December 17, 2024
- Preceded by: Libby Schaaf
- Succeeded by: Nikki Fortunato Bas (acting)

President pro tempore of the Oakland City Council
- In office January 4, 2021 – January 9, 2023
- Preceded by: Dan Kalb
- Succeeded by: Dan Kalb

Member of the Oakland City Council from 4th district
- In office January 2019 – January 9, 2023
- Preceded by: Annie Campbell Washington
- Succeeded by: Janani Ramachandran

Personal details
- Born: 1985 (age 40–41) Stockton, California, U.S.
- Party: Democratic
- Children: 2
- Education: Merritt College (AA); University of California, Berkeley (BA)

Sheng Thao (RPA: Seeb Thoj, Pahawh: 𖬀𖬶𖬤𖬵 𖬒𖬲𖬟𖬰; born 1985) is an American politician who served as the 51st mayor of Oakland, California from 2023 to 2024. She was the first Hmong American mayor of a major city in the United States. She was elected as mayor of Oakland in November 2022 and started her term in January 2023. On November 5, 2024, Thao was recalled.

During her tenure as mayor, Thao pledged to focus on crime, homelessness, and affordable housing. In June 2024, the Federal Bureau of Investigation raided Thao's home as part of an ongoing investigation, and in January 2025, she was indicted by a grand jury on federal bribery charges.

== Early life and education ==
Thao was born on July 17, 1985, and raised in Stockton, California. Her parents were refugees from Laos who escaped from the Hmong genocide and eventually immigrated to the United States. Thao was the seventh of ten children and grew up in poverty, spending some of her childhood in public housing.

At age 17, Thao moved out of her home and began working at a Walgreens store in Richmond. After moving to Oakland in her 20s, she became a victim of domestic violence while in an abusive relationship. Thao left the relationship when she was six months pregnant, and then lived in her car and couch-surfed before and after her son was born. When her son was ten months old, Thao began attending Merritt College in Oakland while raising her son as a single mother and working as a research assistant.

After she completed an associate degree in legal studies at Merritt College, Thao transferred to the University of California, Berkeley, where she earned a bachelor's degree in legal studies and a minor in city planning.

== Early career ==
Following her graduation from UC Berkeley in 2012, Thao worked for at-large council member Rebecca Kaplan as a paid intern. Thao later worked for Kaplan at the Oakland City Council, becoming her chief of staff years later.

== Oakland City Council ==
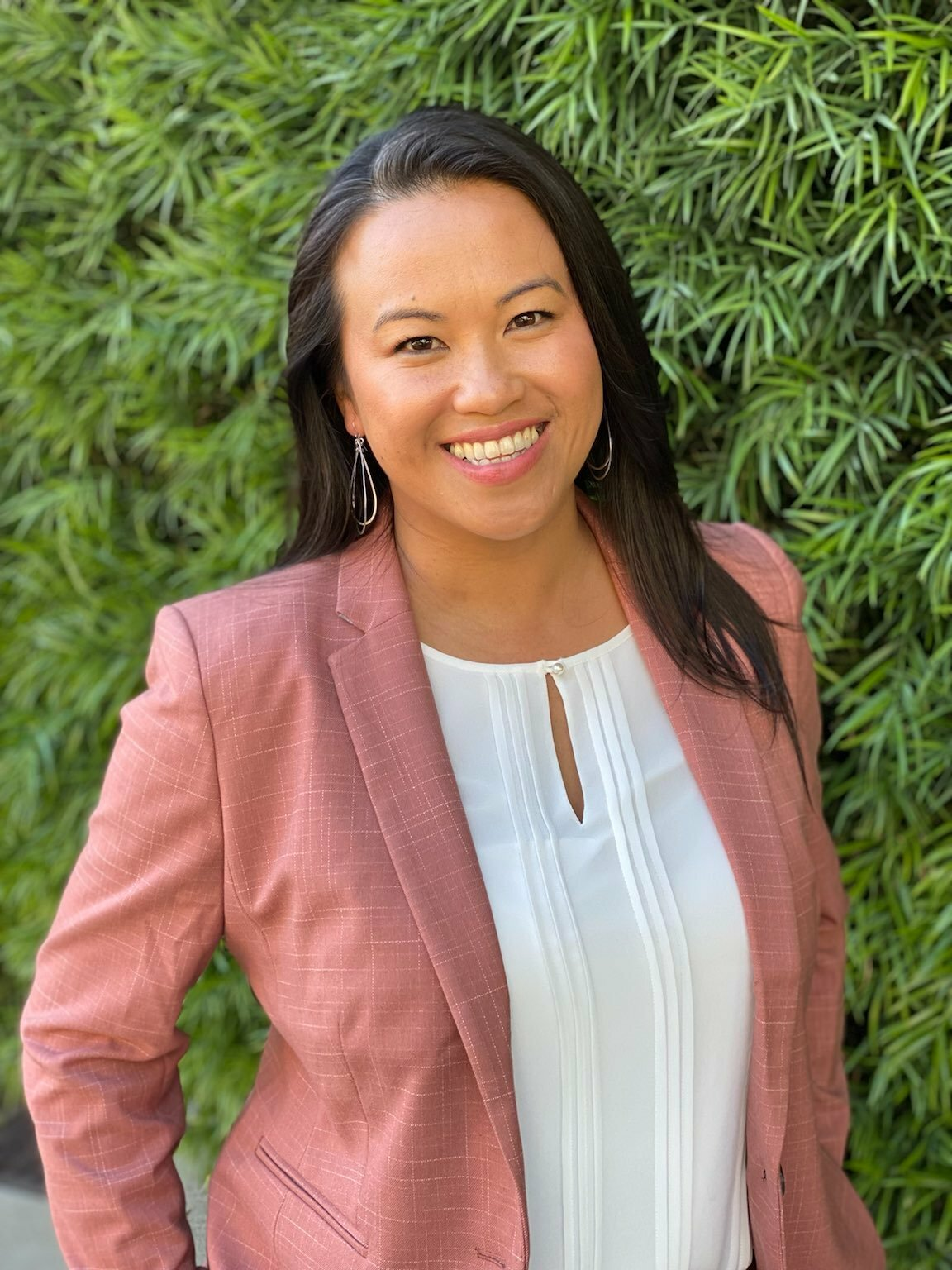
Portrait of Thao during her tenure on the Oakland City Council

Thao decided to run for office in 2018, when the election for the district 4 City Council seat was an open race, lacking an incumbent. Thao ran on the priorities of tackling Oakland's housing crisis, improving public safety with better response systems and community policing, and building public infrastructure such as libraries and parks. Thao defeated six other candidates and won with 54% of the vote.

Thao began her term as a member of the Oakland City Council in January 2019. Thao served in the Oakland City Council's 4th district seat, representing the neighborhoods of Montclair, Laurel, Melrose, Redwood Heights, and the Dimond District. She was the first Hmong woman to be elected as a member of a city council in the state of California and the first Hmong person elected to the Oakland City Council. On the city council, Thao served as president pro tempore.

During her tenure on the city council, Thao led efforts to expand the number of police academies from four to five, and co-authored ordinances approved by the council to address housing insecurity by expanding access for code-compliant RVs and mobile homes in the city.

== Mayor of Oakland ==
Thao took office on January 9, 2023. As mayor-elect, her proposals included the development of 30,000 units of new housing over eight years, rent control and other protections for tenants, improving safety and sanitation for homeless residents, hiring more police officers, and increasing spending for education and violence prevention programs.

=== Campaign ===
On November 10, 2021, Thao announced her candidacy for Oakland mayor and the endorsements of council president Nikki Fortunato Bas, vice mayor Rebecca Kaplan, and Attorney General Rob Bonta. Her campaign also received support from labor unions, the Alameda County Democratic Party, and Ro Khanna, the U.S. representative for the 17th congressional district of California. Oakland City Council member Loren Taylor, one of her opponents, was endorsed by Libby Schaaf, the incumbent mayor of Oakland, as well as London Breed and Sam Liccardo, the mayors of nearby San Francisco and San Jose. By the end of the campaign, Thao and Taylor were considered to be the two front-runners.

Thao, relating her own experiences, including childhood poverty, domestic violence, and renting, campaigned for increasing the funding of the Department of Violence Prevention in Oakland to improve access to affordable housing and reduce homelessness.

In June 2022, a former staffer filed an informal verbal complaint with the Public Ethics Commission, alleging Thao had Oakland City Council staff work on her campaign (in a possible violation of state election laws), and that the staffer was fired after refusing to do campaign work. Thao denied the allegations and the ethics commission opened an investigation in June 2022. After the matter was reported by a political blogger that supported one of Thao's opponents in October 2022, the allegations gained media attention.

On November 18, 2022, Thao won the election by 677 votes through a ranked-choice (instant-runoff) voting system. On November 22, 2022, the margin of victory increased to 682 votes, and her opponent, Taylor, conceded. A recount was formally requested and received support from the city's chapter of the NAACP, but the required funding was not raised for the costs. Thao stated she supported the recount.

=== Public safety ===
After a law firm hired during the previous year by the City of Oakland produced an investigative report which was officially published on January 18, 2023, alleging misconduct in the Oakland police department, Thao placed Oakland Police Chief LeRonne Armstrong on administrative leave on January 19. During a press conference on January 21, Thao said "it's important that we look at taking the corrective action that is needed to make sure that we stay on track to make sure that we get out of the federal oversight," referring to the oversight the police department had been subject to for the past twenty years. Thao fired Armstrong on February 15, 2023, and indicated she had lost confidence in his ability to reform the police department. Armstrong filed a wrongful terminational lawsuit against the city of Oakland and Thao. In March 2024, Thao appointed Floyd Mitchell as the new police chief.

Thao's administration faced criticism from community leaders after missing a deadline to apply for the Organized Retail Theft Prevention (ORTP) Grant Program. The grant awards cities millions of dollars to fight retail crime through allocating funds "to hire more officers, create task forces and develop investigative units." An audit released in May 2024 conducted by the acting City Auditor of Oakland found that, "there was poor communication, within departments and between departments, there was no project management and no one really took charge." The City of Oakland prepared, but "did not successfully submit an application for the ORTP (Organized Retail Theft Prevention) grant."

In September 2023, Thao announced $2.5 million in more funding for the 911 response system. In her State of the City address on October 17, 2023, Thao discussed crime and public safety, including efforts to improve the 911 system, obtain new California Highway Patrol officers, and hire a person responsible for applying to grants. The Oakland Police Department's crime report for April of 2024 noted "33 percent fewer violent crimes overall this year compared to last year."

In July 2024, Gavin Newsom, the Governor of California, urged Oakland to allow more police pursuits. Currently, Oakland only allows police pursuits when a suspect is armed with a gun or involved in a forcible violent crime, a policy that has been in place since 2014. Newsom has described this policy as an "outlier."

=== Business closures ===
During Thao's tenure, several Oakland businesses closed due to safety concerns. In-N-Out, Denny's, Starbucks, Black Bear Diner, and Subway cited safety concerns for their employees and customers as the reasons for the closures. Other businesses, Raising Canes and Taco Bell, shut down dining rooms to reduce the risk of crime. Kaiser Permanente, Clorox, and Blue Shield increased security and warned employees about crime in the area. In a statement to KTVU, Thao said she prioritized public safety and said "that she added police presence and employed technology 'to deter and respond to criminal behavior.'" Thao's office provided statistics that showed a decline in some areas of crime in the Hegenberger Road corridor where In-N-Out was located.

=== Oakland Athletics negotiations ===
For several months, Thao's administration continued negotiations with the owners of the Oakland Athletics for the team to stay in Oakland, which had begun during the administration of Thao's predecessor, Libby Schaaf. In April 2023, the team president announced an agreement to buy land for a stadium in Las Vegas. On April 20, Thao indicated she was open to continuing negotiations despite the announcement by the team. In July 2023, Thao and other Oakland officials met with MLB Commissioner of Baseball Rob Manfred and Deputy Commissioner Dan Halem to discuss the proposal for the A's to stay in Oakland. John Fisher, owner of the Oakland Athletics, rejected the City of Oakland’s "offer for a five-year, $97 million lease extension on the Coliseum" and a revised, "final three-year, $60 million lease," ultimately relocating the team to Las Vegas.

Thao announced on May 22, 2024, that the City of Oakland would sell its share of the Coliseum (the former home of the Oakland A's) to the African American Sports & Entertainment Group (AASEG) for $105 million. The money from the sale was expected to "help fill shortfalls in the city's budget" and city officials said the sale would pave "the way for a proposed sports and entertainment destination site, thousands of new affordable housing units, and community benefits for historically neglected East Oakland." The deal has thus far not been completed.

=== Budget ===
In May 2023, Thao proposed a two-year $4.2 billion budget with city department mergers and hiring freezes proposed to help account for a $360 million budget deficit. A $4.2 billion budget was passed by the city council in June 2023 to address the deficit with some department mergers, hiring freezes to prevent layoffs, and spending cuts.

In 2024, Oakland faced a $117 million deficit. Thao and Oakland's city council approved budget changes that "will avoid drastic cuts but also rely on the still-pending sale of the city’s most valuable real estate property." The pending sale of the Coliseum is "estimated to bring in $105 million." Financial analysts warned city officials against relying on sales of assets to "remedy short-term budget shortfalls."

=== Recall ===
A group called Oakland United to Recall Sheng Thao (OUST) organized to recall her from office and submitted a petition on June 5, 2024. On June 18, 2024, the Alameda County Registrar of Voters received around 40,000 petition signatures. A random sample projected that roughly 26% of the petitions, or somewhere around 10,753 signatures, were not "valid signatures of qualified registered voters" in the city. Alameda County's elections office estimated that the whole batch would exceed 110% of the necessary threshold, or enough to trigger a recall election outright without a full manual count of signatures. The recall was the first mayoral recall election in Oakland's history.

A small group of protestors rallied outside of Oakland City Hall calling for Thao to address a Juneteenth celebration mass shooting at Lake Merritt that wounded 15 people and the FBI raid at her home. The group supported the recall election and demanded Thao's resignation. The election was scheduled to coincide with the U.S. presidential election. On August 6, 2024, Oakland's police union called on Thao to resign.

She was successfully recalled on November 5, 2024. 60.62% voted in favor of the recall and 39.38% voted against it. Former U.S. representative Barbara Lee was elected to fill the remainder of her term in April 2025.

== Bribery charges ==
The Federal Bureau of Investigation, along with agents from the Internal Revenue Service and United States Postal Inspection Service, raided Thao's home on June 20, 2024 as part of a corruption investigation. Three other residences and properties were also raided on the same day. Following the raid, the Oakland chapter of the NAACP called on Sheng Thao to resign. On July 8, 2024, the U.S. Attorney’s Office subpoenaed the city of Oakland for documents and records.

In January 2025, Thao was indicted by a federal grand jury on federal bribery charges. The charges allege a pay-to-play scheme in which $75,000 was paid to Thao in the form of negative advertisements against her opponents in the 2022 mayoral race as well as $95,000 to Thao's partner for "no-show" jobs, in exchange for the city of Oakland renewing its recycling contract with Cal Waste Solutions and purchasing housing with the paying companies. Cal Waste Solutions has had a number of legal troubles prior to the bribery charges, including fines from the state for violating beverage container redemption laws and a lawsuit alleging that the company overcharged Oakland residents for recycling services between 2010 and 2021. After she pled not guilty, Thao's trial is expected to start in October 2026.

== Personal life ==
As of 2024, Sheng Thao was living with her partner, Andre Jones, and their two children in a four-bedroom home on Maiden Lane in Oakland's Lincoln Highlands neighborhood. She met Jones during her internship with Oakland City Council member Rebecca Kaplan when he was Kaplan's chief of staff. Jones was also arrested and indicted by the Department of Justice for bribery in 2025.

Political offices
Preceded by Libby Schaaf	Mayor of Oakland; 2023–2024	Succeeded by Nikki Fortunato Bas; Acting
