= 2022 Oakland mayoral election =

- November 8, 2022
- Turnout: 53.28%
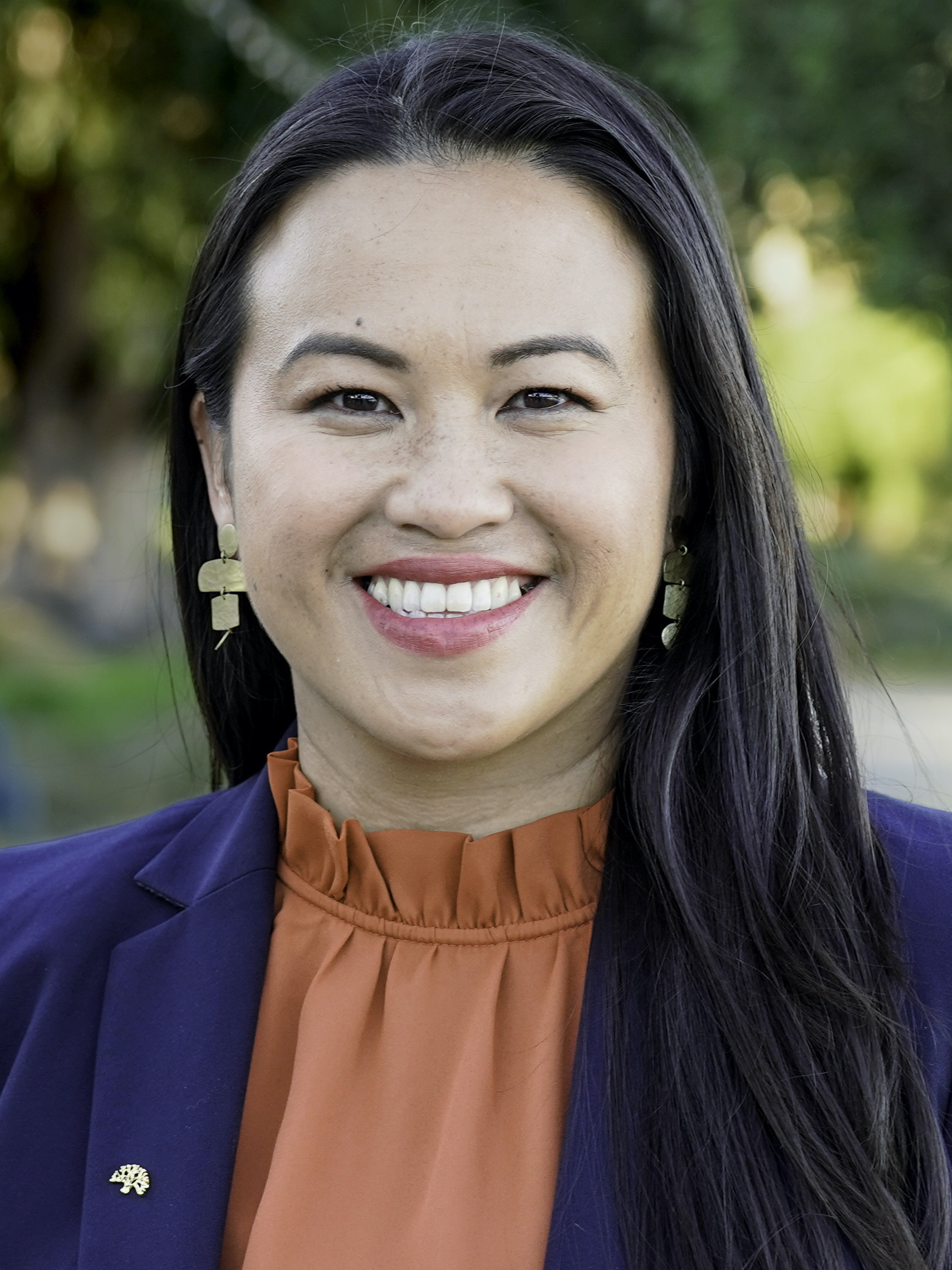

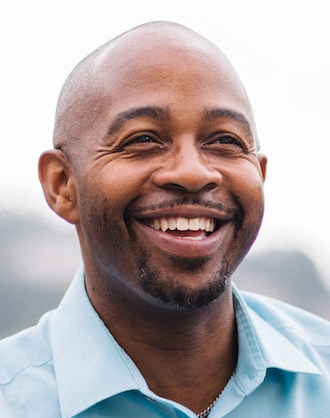

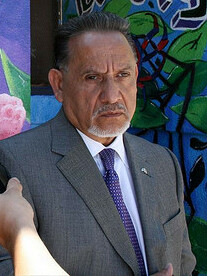

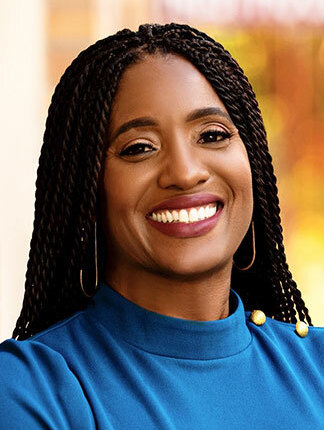
Candidate	Sheng Thao	Loren Taylor	Ignacio De La Fuente
First round	39,909; 31.79%	41,510; 33.07%	12,893; 10.27%
Final round	57,206; 50.30%	56,529; 49.70%	Eliminated
Candidate	Allyssa Victory	Treva Reid
First round	10,949; 8.72%	7,627; 6.08%
Final round	Eliminated	Eliminated
Mayor before election
Libby Schaaf
Elected mayor
Sheng Thao

The 2022 Oakland mayoral election was held on November 8, 2022, to elect the mayor of Oakland, California. Incumbent mayor Libby Schaaf was term-limited. Sheng Thao won the election and was inaugurated as mayor in January 2023.

The position is non-partisan. The election was held using instant-runoff voting, the rules of which include voters ranking their top five candidates. If one candidate receives a majority (greater than 50%) of the #1 ranked votes, they win the election, but if no candidate meets that criteria, then the candidates with the lowest votes are eliminated and tallying continues to the #2 ranking, and so on until a single candidate receives a majority of votes. Following election day, ballot tallying showed that no candidate received the minimum >50% of the vote necessary to win outright. The two candidates with the most #1 ranked votes were Councilmember Loren Taylor and Councilmember Sheng Thao, with Taylor receiving slightly more votes. Vote tallying continued for over a week, before Thao was eventually declared winner on November 21. The final tally, after rank tallying, had Thao with 50.3% of the 113,636 votes and Taylor with 49.7%.

== Candidates ==
=== Qualified ===
- Ignacio De La Fuente, former city councilor from the 5th district and candidate for mayor in 1998 and 2006
- Greg Hodge, former school board member
- Tyron Jordan, paralegal
- Peter Liu, entrepreneur and perennial candidate
- Treva Reid, city councilor from the 7th district
- John Reimann, retired carpenter and Carpenters Local 713 secretary
- Seneca Scott, housing activist
- Loren Taylor, city councilor from the 6th district
- Sheng Thao, city councilor from the 4th district
- Allyssa Victory, labor union attorney

=== Disqualified ===
- Monesha "MJ" Carter
- Derrick Soo

== Endorsements ==
Loren Taylor

Local officials

- Sam Liccardo, incumbent Mayor of San Jose
- Darrell Steinberg, Mayor of Sacramento
- Michael Tubbs, former Mayor of Stockton

Newspapers

- San Francisco Chronicle
Sheng Thao

State officials

- Rob Bonta, Attorney General of California

State legislators

- Mia Bonta, state assemblywoman for the 18th district

Local officials

- Nikki Fortunato Bas, President of the Oakland City Council
- Rebecca Kaplan, Vice Mayor of Oakland

Organizations

- California Nurses Association
- National Union of Healthcare Workers
- Oakland Tenants Union
- Planned Parenthood
- Working Families Party
Allyssa Victory

Organizations

- Oakland Tenants Union

== Results ==
2022 Oakland mayoral election results
Candidate	Round 1	Round 2		Round 3		Round 4		Round 5		Round 6		Round 7		Round 8		Round 9	
Candidate	Votes	Transfer	Votes	Transfer	Votes	Transfer	Votes	Transfer	Votes	Transfer	Votes	Transfer	Votes	Transfer	Votes	Transfer	Votes
Sheng Thao	39,909; 31.79%	+118	40,127; 31.84%	+268	40,395; 32.11%	+241	40,636; 32.36%	+443	41,079; 32.90%	+1,565	42,643; 34.41%	+2,017	44,660; 36.44%	+8,430	53,090; 44.22%	+4,116	57,206; 50.30%
Loren Taylor	41,510; 33.07%	+267	41,777; 33.15%	+80	41,857; 33.27%	+113	41,970; 33.42%	+926	42,906; 34.36%	+1,739	44,645; 36.03%	+3,612	48,257; 39.38%	+2,162	50,419; 42.00%	+6,110	56,529; 49.70%
Ignacio de la Fuente	12,893; 10.27%	+199	13,092; 10.39%	+80	13,172; 10.47%	+87	13,259; 10.56%	+671	13,930; 11.16%	+585	14,515; 11.71%	+970	15,485; 12.64%	+1,053	16,538; 13.78%	-16,538	Eliminated
Allyssa Victory	10,949; 8.72%	+166	11,115; 8.82%	+63	11,178; 8.88%	+296	11,474; 9.14%	+325	11,799; 9.45%	+1,294	13,093; 10.57%	+1,056	14,149; 11.55%	-14,149	Eliminated		
Treva Reid	7,627; 6.08%	+195	7,822; 6.21%	+57	7,879; 6.26%	+95	7,974; 6.35%	+304	8,278; 6.83%	+744	9,022; 7.28%	-9,022	Eliminated				
Greg Hodge	5,798; 4.62%	+135	5,933; 4.71%	+55	5,988; 4.76%	+138	6,126; 4.88%	+760	6,886; 5.51%	-6,886	Eliminated						
Seneca Scott	3,745; 2.98%	+111	3,856; 3.06%	+100	3,956; 3.14%	+195	4,151; 3.31%	-4,151	Eliminated								
John Reimann	1,268; 1.01%	+54	1,322; 1.05%	+54	1,391; 1.11%	-1,391	Eliminated										
Peter Liu	960; 0.77%	+40	1,000; 0.79%	-1,000	Eliminated												
Tyron Jordan	863; 0.69%	-863	Eliminated														
Suspended (Note: Ballots where a voter did not indicate a first choice, but did indicate a second choice and so on.)	810	-810															
Total active votes	126,332; 100.00%	-288	126,044; 100.00%	-228	125,816; 100.00%	-226	125,590; 100.00%	-712	124,878; 100.00%	-960	123,918; 100.00%	-1,367	122,551; 100.00%	-2,504	120,047; 100.00%	-6,312	113,735; 100.00%

2022 Oakland mayoral election results
Candidate	Maximum round	Maximum votes	Share in maximum round	Maximum votes First round votesTransfer votes
Sheng Thao	9	56,841	50.3%	
Loren Taylor	9	56,161	49.7%	
Ignacio de la Fuente	8	16,538	13.8%	
Allyssa Victory	7	14,149	11.6%	
Treva Reid	6	9,022	7.3%	
Greg Hodge	5	6,886	5.5%	
Seneca Scott	4	4,151	3.3%	
John Reimann	3	1,391	1.1%	
Peter Liu	2	1,000	0.8%	
Tyron Jordan	1	860	0.7%	
