= Nikki Fortunato Bas =

American politician (born 1968)

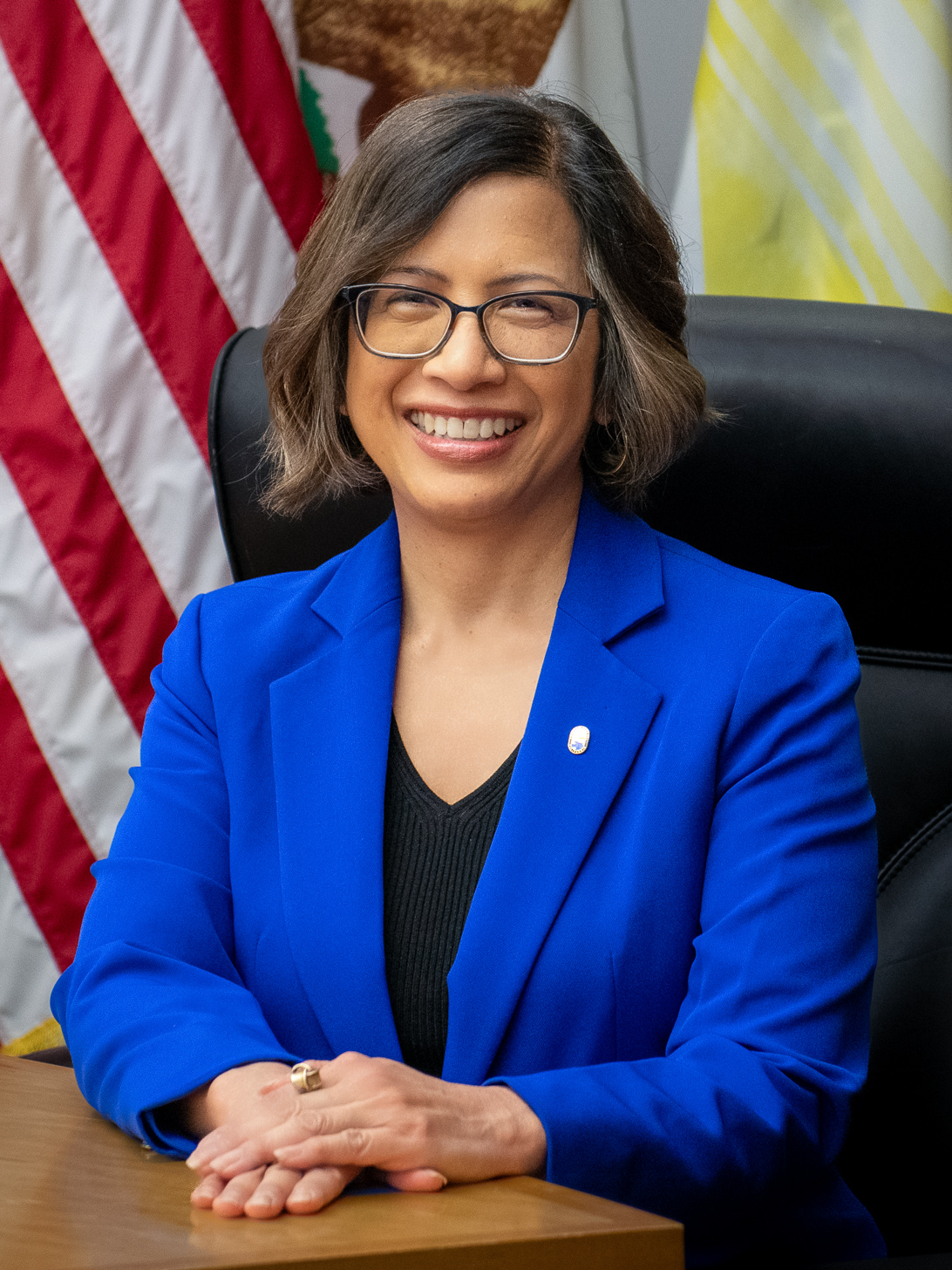
- Official portrait, 2025

Member of the Alameda County Board of Supervisors from the 5th district
- Incumbent
- Assumed office January 6, 2025
- Preceded by: Keith Carson

Interim Mayor of Oakland
- In office December 17, 2024 – January 6, 2025
- Preceded by: Sheng Thao
- Succeeded by: Barbara Lee; Kevin Jenkins (interim)

Member of the Oakland City Council from the 2nd district
- In office January 7, 2019 – December 17, 2024
- Preceded by: Abel Guillen
- Succeeded by: Charlene Wang; Rebecca Kaplan (interim)

Personal details
- Born: 1968 (age 57–58) New York, U.S.
- Party: Democratic
- Education: University of Virginia (BS)
- Website: Campaign website

Nikki Fortunato Bas (born 1968) is an American politician serving on the Alameda County Board of Supervisors for the 5th district. She was previously a member of the Oakland City Council from the 2nd district from 2019 to 2024, serving as the Council President since 2021, and briefly as interim Mayor of Oakland following the recall of Sheng Thao.

== Early life and education ==
Fortunato Bas was born in 1968 in New York to Dr. Mauricio Bas and nurse Fe Fortunato Bas. They immigrated to the United States in the 1960s from Cebu and Mindoro to continue their education. Bas graduated from the University of Virginia, where she earned a Bachelor of Science in economics in 1990, then moved to California. She is a member of the Democratic party.

== Oakland City Council ==
Fortunato Bas was first elected to the Oakland City Council in 2018, succeeding Abel Guillen. She was sworn in on January 7, 2019, making her the first Filipino-American to hold public office in the city.

Bas proposed and voted to cut the Oakland public safety budget by tens of millions of dollars, despite Oakland having one of the highest violent crime rates in the United States.

While a council member, public schools in her district were found to have extremely dangerous levels of lead in the drinking water. At Crocker Highlands elementary school, lead contamination exceeding thresholds was found in 50% of the water fixtures, with the highest level of contamination detected being 440 parts per billion. Parents of students at the school were not immediately informed about the dangerous levels of lead in the drinking after for months after it was discovered. As of October 2025, the water at Crocker Highlands continued to test at unsafe levels and has not yet to be remediated.

She resigned the position on December 17, 2024.

She briefly served as interim mayor of Oakland following the recall of Sheng Thao who was arrested by the FBI and charged with bribery by the Department of Justice. Barbara Lee was elected to fill the remainder of the term in a special election.

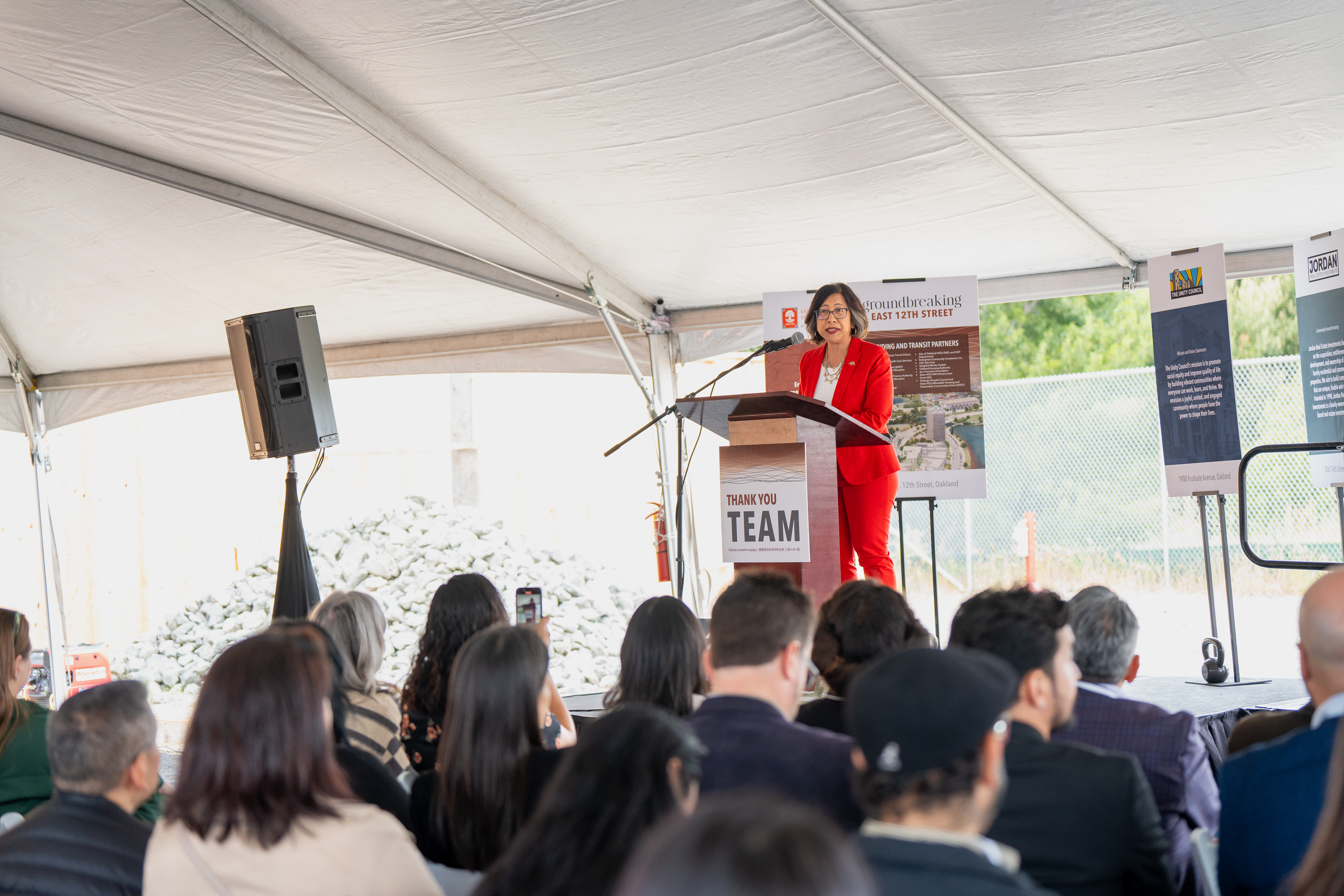

== Alameda County Board of Supervisors ==
Fortunato Bas narrowly defeated Emeryville City Councilmember and former mayor John Bauters in the 2024 general election.

== Personal life ==
Fortunato Bas and her husband, Brad Erickson, faculty union president at San Francisco State University, and their daughter, Balana, live in Oakland.

Political offices
Preceded by Sheng Thao	Mayor of Oakland; Interim; 2024–2025	Succeeded by Kevin Jenkins; Interim
