= 2024 Oakland mayoral recall election =

Recall election in Oakland

- November 5, 2024
- Shall Sheng Thao be recalled (removed) from the office of mayor?

Results
Choice	Votes	%
Yes	86,535	60.62%
No	56,220	39.38%
Valid votes	142,755	100.00%
Invalid or blank votes	0	0.00%
Total votes	142,755	100.00%
Results by consolidated precinct
Yes (for recall): 50–55% 55–60% 60–65% 65–70% 70–75% 75–80% >80%	No (against recall): 50–55% 55–60% 60–65%	No votes
Mayor before election
Sheng Thao
Elected mayor
Nikki Fortunato Bas (interim)

The 2024 Oakland mayoral recall election was a successful special recall election to remove Oakland mayor Sheng Thao from office less than two years into her first four-year term. It was held on November 5, 2024 concurrent with the statewide and nationwide general elections.

== Background ==
Sheng Thao was elected mayor in 2022 with a margin of 0.6% after instant-runoff voting. Her administration attracted criticism for firing its Chief of Police in early 2023 following a report that the Chief mishandled internal investigations, failing to submit an application for a $2 million retail theft prevention grant, and blamed for Oakland's relatively high crime rate. Thao's home was raided by the FBI in June 2024, reportedly as part of a corruption investigation into kickbacks to California Waste Solutions, a waste and recycling contractor, in return for 2022 campaign contributions.

In June 2024, the recall obtained enough signatures to be placed on the ballot alongside the recall of Alameda District Attorney Pamela Price.

Former mayor Libby Schaaf and former Oakland councilmember Loren Taylor supported the recall, while U.S. Congresswoman Barbara Lee and former mayor Jean Quan opposed it. Piedmont resident and hedge fund manager Philip Dreyfuss contributed $605,000 to the recall campaign, and $200,000 to Price's recall.

== Results ==
2024 Oakland mayoral recall election
Choice	Votes	%
For	86,535	60.62
Against	56,220	39.38
Total	142,755	100.00
Source: Alameda County Department of Elections
