= Barbara Lee =

American politician (born 1946)

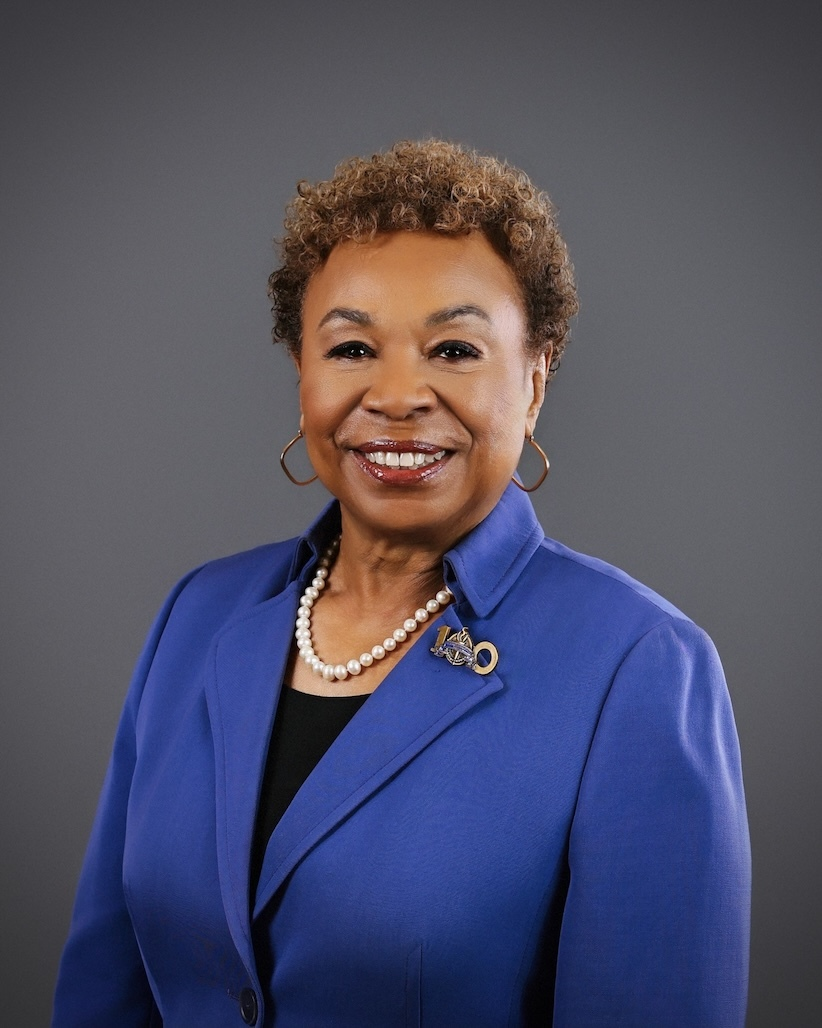
- Official portrait, 2025

52nd Mayor of Oakland
- Incumbent
- Assumed office May 20, 2025
- Preceded by: Kevin Jenkins (acting)

Member of the U.S. House of Representatives from California
- In office April 7, 1998 – January 3, 2025 (Note: Lee's official service begins on the date of the special election, while she was not sworn in until April 21, 1998.)
- Preceded by: Ron Dellums
- Succeeded by: Lateefah Simon
- Constituency: 9th district (1998–2013); 13th district (2013–2023); 12th district (2023–2025)
House positions
Chair of the Congressional Black Caucus
In office January 3, 2009 – January 3, 2011
Preceded by	Carolyn Cheeks Kilpatrick
Succeeded by	Emanuel Cleaver
Chair of the Congressional Progressive Caucus
In office January 3, 2005 – January 3, 2009 Serving with Lynn Woolsey
Preceded by	Peter DeFazio
Succeeded by	Raúl Grijalva

Member of the California State Senate from the 9th district
- In office December 2, 1996 – April 17, 1998
- Preceded by: Nicholas Petris
- Succeeded by: Don Perata

Member of the California State Assembly
- In office December 3, 1990 – November 30, 1996
- Preceded by: Elihu Harris
- Succeeded by: Don Perata
- Constituency: 13th district (1990–1992); 16th district (1992–1996)

Personal details
- Born: Barbara Jean Tutt; July 16, 1946 (age 80) El Paso, Texas, U.S.
- Party: Democratic
- Other political affiliations: Black Panther (c. 1969–1970s)
- Spouses: Carl Lee (m. 1964; div. 1966); Clyde Oden (m. 2019)
- Children: 2
- Education: Mills College (BA); University of California, Berkeley (MSW)
- Website: Office website Campaign website
- Lee's voice Lee opposing military force against Afghanistan. Recorded September 14, 2001

Barbara Jean Lee (née Tutt; born July 16, 1946) is an American politician who has served as the 52nd mayor of Oakland since 2025. A member of the Democratic Party, Lee previously served as a U.S. representative from California from 1998 to 2025, representing California's 12th congressional district (numbered as the 9th district from 1998 to 2013 and as the 13th district from 2013 to 2023). She also served in both houses of the California State Legislature from 1990 to 1998.

Born and raised in Texas, Lee was educated at Mills College and the University of California, Berkeley. She started her career by working on the presidential campaign of Shirley Chisholm and was later involved with the Black Panther Party. After working as chief of staff for U.S. Representative Ron Dellums, Lee served in the California State Assembly from 1990 to 1996 and in the California State Senate from 1996 to 1998.

Lee was elected to the House of Representatives in a 1998 special election to succeed Dellums. Her district was based in Oakland and covered most of the northern part of Alameda County; with a Cook Partisan Voting Index rating of D+40, it was one of the most Democratic districts in the country. A noted progressive, she chaired the Congressional Progressive Caucus from 2005 to 2009 and the Congressional Black Caucus from 2009 to 2011. She was also founding member of the Congressional LGBTQ+ Equality Caucus and co-chaired the House Democratic Steering Committee and the Congressional Cannabis Caucus. She is known for playing a major role in the antiwar movement throughout her time in Congress—most notably in her vocal criticism of the Iraq War and for being the only member of Congress to vote against the authorization of use of force following the September 11 attacks—and for her work with President George W. Bush to curb the spread of HIV/AIDS through the creation of the President's Emergency Plan for AIDS Relief.

In 2024, Lee chose not to pursue re-election in the House and instead ran for Senate to succeed Dianne Feinstein. Lee lost in the jungle primary to Republican Steve Garvey and fellow Democratic Rep. Adam Schiff, who won the seat in the general election. After leaving Congress, Lee announced her campaign for mayor of Oakland in the 2025 special election triggered by the recall of Sheng Thao and defeated former city councilmember Loren Taylor. She was sworn in on May 20, 2025, becoming the first Black woman to serve as mayor of Oakland.

== Early life and education ==
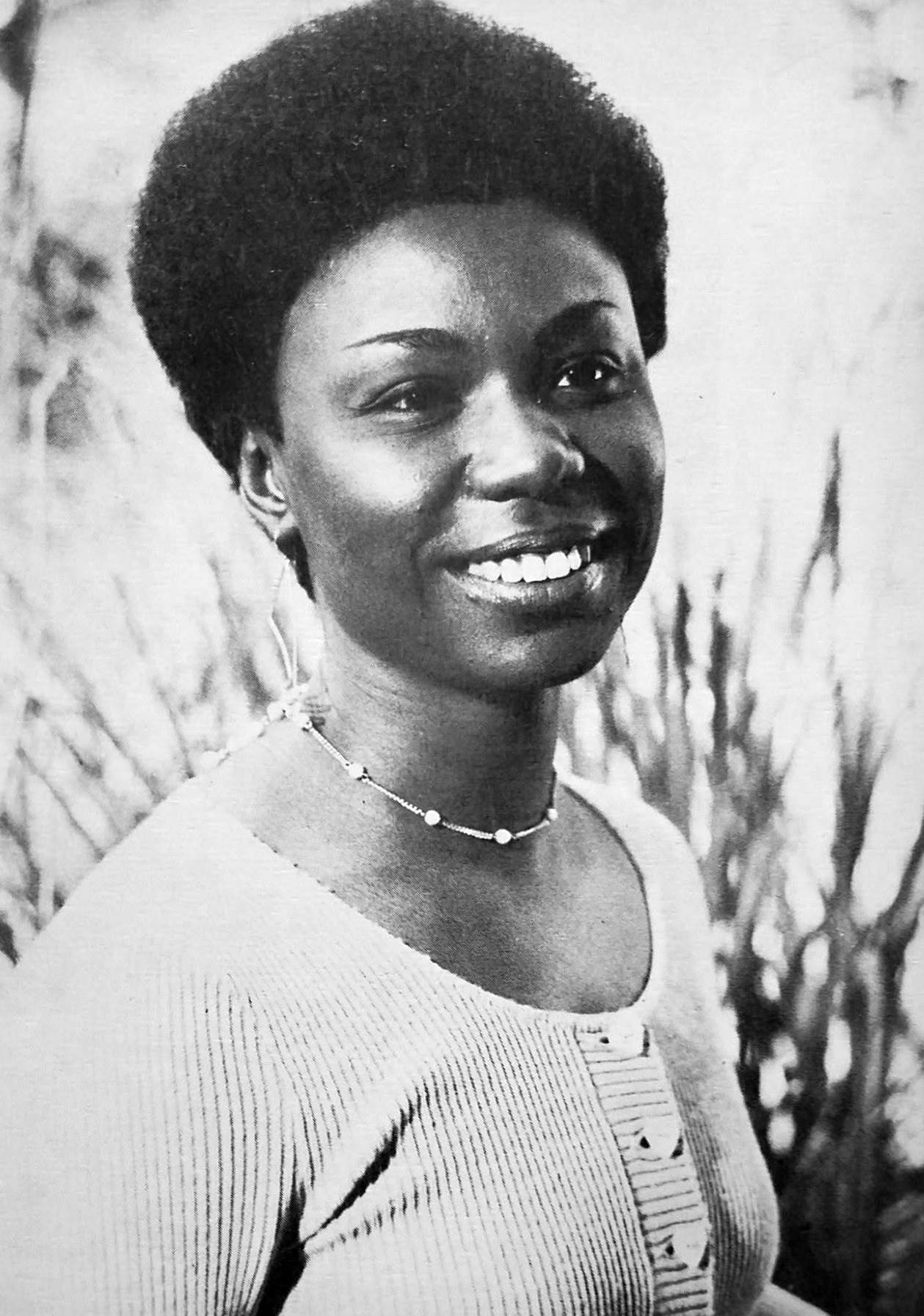
Lee in the Mills College yearbook c. 1973

Lee was born Barbara Jean Tutt on July 16, 1946, in El Paso, Texas. She is the oldest of three daughters of Mildred Adaire (née Parish; 1924–2015) and Garvin Alexander Tutt (1924–2007), a lieutenant colonel in the United States Army. When she was born in a segregated hospital, her mother was left in the hallway, as the hospital refused to assist her. Lee is African American; according to a DNA analysis, she descends primarily from the people of Guinea-Bissau and Sierra Leone. She was raised Catholic and attended Catholic schools, where she was taught by the Sisters of Loretto. She was the only African-American Girl Scout in El Paso, and she recalls having faced racial discrimination throughout her childhood.

Lee's parents divorced in 1955. Five years later, she moved to California with her mother and two sisters. She attended San Fernando High School in the Pacoima neighborhood of Los Angeles, where she worked with the NAACP to become the school's first African-American cheerleader, and she graduated in 1964. When she was 15, Lee had a back-alley abortion in Ciudad Juárez. She married Carl Lee, a member of the United States Air Force, and moved with him to England after high school; they had two children, and then divorced when Lee was 20. After the birth of her first child in 1966, Lee returned to California's San Fernando Valley. Lee describes the marriage as abusive, and she became homeless following the divorce.

She later moved to the Bay Area and attended Mills College, where she served as president of the college's Black Student Union, and she graduated in 1973 with a bachelor of arts in psychology. She later attended the University of California, Berkeley, from where she graduated in 1975 with a master of social work. Throughout college, Lee was a single mother of two on public assistance and food stamps, and she often took her children to class because she was unable to afford child care.

== Early political career ==
Lee worked for the Glendale Welfare Council and later as a statistical clerk for the California Department of Labor Statistics. As president of the Mills College Black Student Union, Lee invited Representative Shirley Chisholm to speak on campus. She was inspired to register to vote by Chisholm's visit, and she went on to work on Chisholm's 1972 presidential campaign, serving as one of her delegates at the 1972 Democratic National Convention. Lee later said Chisholm was a mentor who inspired her to run for office. Also while a student, Lee volunteered at the Oakland chapter of the Black Panther Party's Community Learning Center and worked on Black Panther co-founder Bobby Seale's 1973 campaign for mayor of Oakland. Lee was surveilled by the Federal Bureau of Investigation due to her involvement with the Black Panthers.

As a graduate student, Lee founded the Community Health Alliance for Neighborhood Growth and Education (CHANGE), a community-based mental health clinic. She was later offered an internship in the office of Representative Ron Dellums, who represented an Oakland-based district. Following the internship, she took a full-time job in Dellums's office and eventually became his chief of staff. Lee was one of the only African Americans and women to hold a senior staff position on Capitol Hill. After leaving Dellums's office in 1987, she returned to the Bay Area and founded a facilities-management company.

== California State Legislature ==
Lee was elected to the California State Assembly in 1990 to succeed Elihu Harris, who retired to successfully run for mayor of Oakland. She served three terms in the Assembly, and she was elected to the California State Senate in 1996. She resigned her seat in the State Senate after winning a special election to the U.S. House of Representatives in 1998.

Lee was the first African-American woman to represent Northern California in the California State Legislature. During her time in the Legislature, she authored 67 bills that were signed into law by then-Governor Pete Wilson, a Republican; among those bills were the California Schools Hate Crimes Prevention Act and the California Violence Against Women Act. Lee also worked to defeat California's three-strikes law and was an early champion of LGBTQ+ rights.

Lee was a member of the California Commission on the Status of Women and founded the California Commission on the Status of African American Males.

== U.S. House of Representatives ==
=== Elections ===
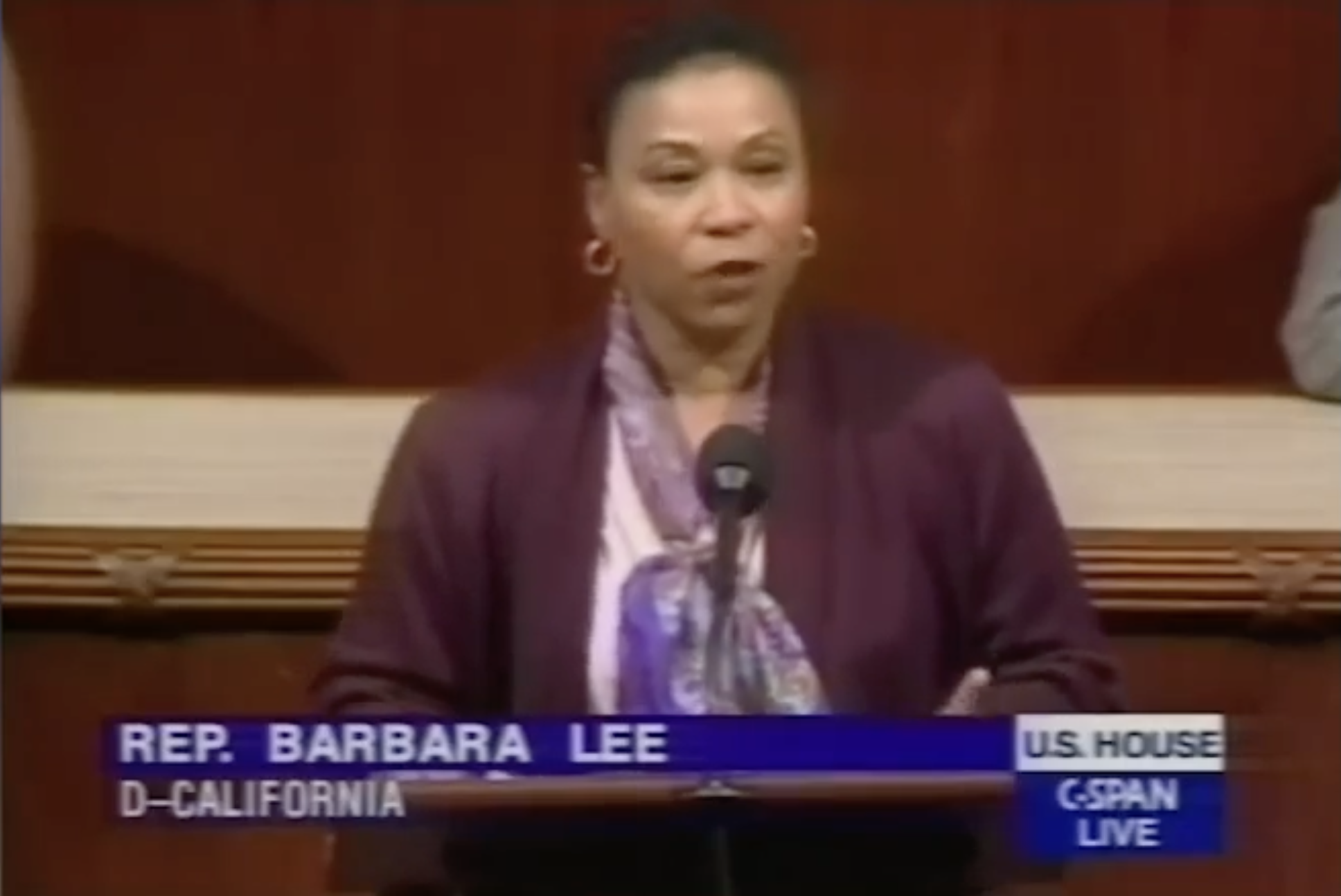
Lee speaking on the House floor on the December 19, 1998 debate that preceded the vote on impeaching President Bill Clinton

After Dellums resigned from the U.S. House of Representatives in 1998, Lee successfully ran in the special election to succeed him, winning 66% of the vote. She was elected to a full term later that year, winning 83% of the vote. She was re-elected to the House of Representatives 12 more times.

In lieu of running for a 14th term, Lee campaigned to succeed Dianne Feinstein in the United States Senate in 2024.

=== Tenure ===
Lee originally represented California's 9th congressional district, from which she served until 2013. She later represented the 13th district from 2013 to 2023, and she represented the 12th district from 2023 until 2025. Her district was located in Alameda County and includes the cities of Oakland, Berkeley, Emeryville, Alameda, Albany, Piedmont, San Leandro, and most of San Lorenzo. The Cook Partisan Voting Index gives her district a rating of D+40, making it one of the most Democratic districts in the nation.

Lee's voting record as a member of Congress was ranked by the National Journal in 2007, based on roll-call votes on economic, social and foreign policy issues in 2006. Lee scored an overall 84.3%, meaning that she voted with a more liberal stance than 84.3% of the House. National Journal scored Lee as voting 82% liberal on economic issues, 92% liberal on social issues, and 65% liberal on foreign policy. The 92% rating on social issues came from Lee being grouped with 35 other House legislators who all tied for the highest, most liberal ranking. In 2006, Lee received a 4% conservative rating from the American Conservative Union. In 2016, GovTrack's 2015 Report Card on members in Congress ranked Lee the 3rd most progressive member of the House.

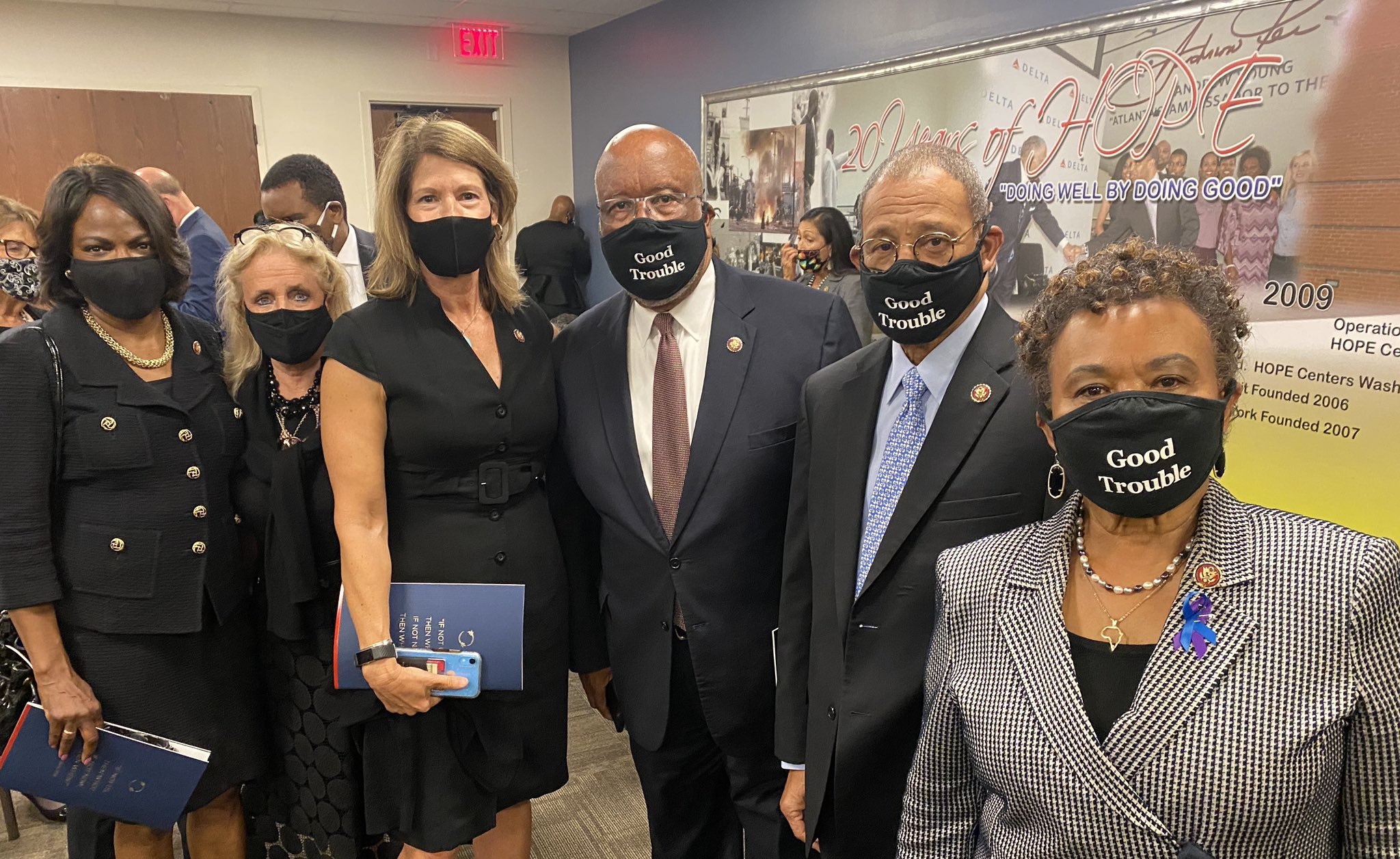
Lee at John Lewis's funeral in Atlanta on July 30, 2020

Lee endorsed Barack Obama in the 2008 Democratic presidential primaries. In February 2019, she endorsed Kamala Harris in the 2020 Democratic presidential primaries.

By January 3, 2023, Lee had voted in line with President Joe Biden's stated position 99.1% of the time.

==== AUMF opposition ====
Lee gained national attention in 2001 as the only member of Congress to vote against the Authorization for Use of Military Force Against Terrorists (AUMF), stating that she voted no not because she opposed military action but because she believed the AUMF, as written, granted the president overly broad powers to wage war at a time when the facts regarding the situation were not yet clear. She "warned her colleagues to be 'careful not to embark on an open-ended war with neither an exit strategy nor a focused target'". Lee has said:

It was a blank check to the president to attack anyone involved in the September 11 events—anywhere, in any country, without regard to our nation's long-term foreign policy, economic and national security interests, and without time limit. In granting these overly broad powers, the Congress failed its responsibility to understand the dimensions of its declaration. I could not support such a grant of war-making authority to the president; I believe it would put more innocent lives at risk. The president has the constitutional authority to protect the nation from further attack, and he has mobilized the armed forces to do just that. The Congress should have waited for the facts to be presented and then acted with fuller knowledge of the consequences of our action.

Her vote made national news and a large and extremely polarized response, with the volume of calls gridlocking the switchboard of her Capitol Hill office. Although it appears to have reflected the beliefs of the majority of her constituents, the majority of responses from elsewhere in the nation were angry and hostile, some calling her "communist" and a "traitor". Many of the responses included death threats against her or her family to the point that the Capitol Police provided round-the-clock plainclothes bodyguards. Lee was also criticized by politicians and in editorial pages of conservative-leaning newspapers, such as John Fund's column in The Wall Street Journal. In 2002, she received the Seán MacBride Peace Prize from the International Peace Bureau for her vote.

In her speech, she quoted Nathan D. Baxter, dean of the Washington National Cathedral: "As we act, let us not become the evil that we deplore."

On June 29, 2017, the House Appropriations Committee approved Lee's amendment to repeal the 2001 AUMF that was the foundation of the United States' post-September 11 military actions. The amendment, if passed, would have required that the AUMF be scrapped within 240 days. In June 2021, Lee sponsored a bipartisan bill in the House to repeal the AUMF, which passed 268–161. The bill was never put to a vote in the Senate.

==== Foreign policy ====
Considered a progressive Democrat, Lee has occasionally split with members of her party throughout her career, especially on foreign policy. Prior to voting against the Authorization for Use of Military Force in 2001, she joined four other representatives in voting against the resolution to authorize Operation Desert Fox in Iraq in 1998, and later voted against US participation in the NATO bombing of Yugoslavia in 1999.

In an August 2017 interview, Lee said of President Donald Trump's comments on North Korea, "His saber-rattling is putting the world at risk. The United States should be the grown-up in the room", and that his rhetoric reminded her of news about the Cuban Missile Crisis during her mid-teens, adding, "the words of war weren't as profound and dangerous and scary [then] as they are now."

In September 2018, Lee was one of 11 House Democrats to sign a statement announcing their intent "to introduce a new, privileged resolution in September invoking the War Powers Resolution of 1973 to withdraw U.S. Armed Forces from engaging in the Saudi-led coalition's conflict with the Houthis should additional escalations continue and progress fail to be made towards a peace agreement."

In April 2019, after the House passed the resolution withdrawing American support for the Saudi-led coalition in Yemen, Lee was one of nine lawmakers to sign a letter to Trump requesting a meeting with him and urging him to sign "Senate Joint Resolution 7, which invokes the War Powers Act of 1973 to end unauthorized US military participation in the Saudi-led coalition's armed conflict against Yemen's Houthi forces, initiated in 2015 by the Obama administration." They asserted the "Saudi-led coalition's imposition of an air-land-and-sea blockade as part of its war against Yemen's Houthis has continued to prevent the unimpeded distribution of these vital commodities, contributing to the suffering and death of vast numbers of civilians throughout the country" and that Trump's approval of the resolution would send a "powerful signal to the Saudi-led coalition to bring the four-year-old war to a close".

In October 2020, Lee co-signed a letter to Secretary of State Mike Pompeo condemning Azerbaijan's offensive operations against the Armenian-populated enclave of Nagorno-Karabakh.

In April 2021, Lee supported President Joe Biden's plan to withdraw all U.S. troops from Afghanistan. In response to the news of the withdrawal, she stated "[w]e are finally doing the right thing, and we’re now on the cusp of ending the longest war in American history for good".

Lee has supported US aid to Ukraine during its invasion by Russia and has voted in favor of all bills for aid to Ukraine, with a rationale to "preserve democracy" and "make sure that the United States is on the right side of history and provides the resources, the economic resources, the humanitarian resources, so that Ukrainian people can live in peace and in security." On July 6, 2023, President Joe Biden authorized the provision of cluster munitions to Ukraine in support of a Ukrainian counter-offensive against Russian forces in Russian-occupied southeastern Ukraine. Lee opposed the Biden administration's decision to supply cluster munitions to Ukraine.

In 2023, after the October 7 attacks in Israel, Lee called for a ceasefire and offered “prayers for those who have been killed, both Israelis and Palestinians.” However, on 25 October 2023, Lee voted in support of a resolution in the house reaffirming support for Israel's defense. In 2024, Lee joined fellow congresswoman Rashida Tlaib in denouncing an amendment to a State Department funding bill that would ban State Department officials from using agency funds to cite any statistics from the Gaza Health Ministry, saying that the Ministry's data is "often the only information available about what is happening on the ground in Gaza", noting that their figures "have been found to be credible in the past, holding up to United Nations scrutiny, independent investigations, and even Israel’s tallies."

==== Gun control ====
Lee is a strong advocate for legislation restricting the availability of guns. She participated in the 2016 sit-in against gun violence in the House of Representatives. Democratic members of Congress adopted the slogan "No Bill, No Break" in an attempt to push the introduction of legislation increasing restrictions on guns. In a statement on the sit-in, Lee said:

Time and again, House Republicans have blocked our ability to keep Americans safe by preventing us from passing common sense gun reforms, including closing a glaring loophole that allows suspected terrorists to purchase weapons of war. These weapons of war, some of which can fire 900 rounds per minute, have no place on America's streets. We simply cannot allow this insanity. My constituents and people from all over the nation have been demanding action, but they are being ignored by the House's Republican leadership. Too many people have already been lost to senseless gun violence. Enough is enough; Congress must act to protect the lives of Americans.

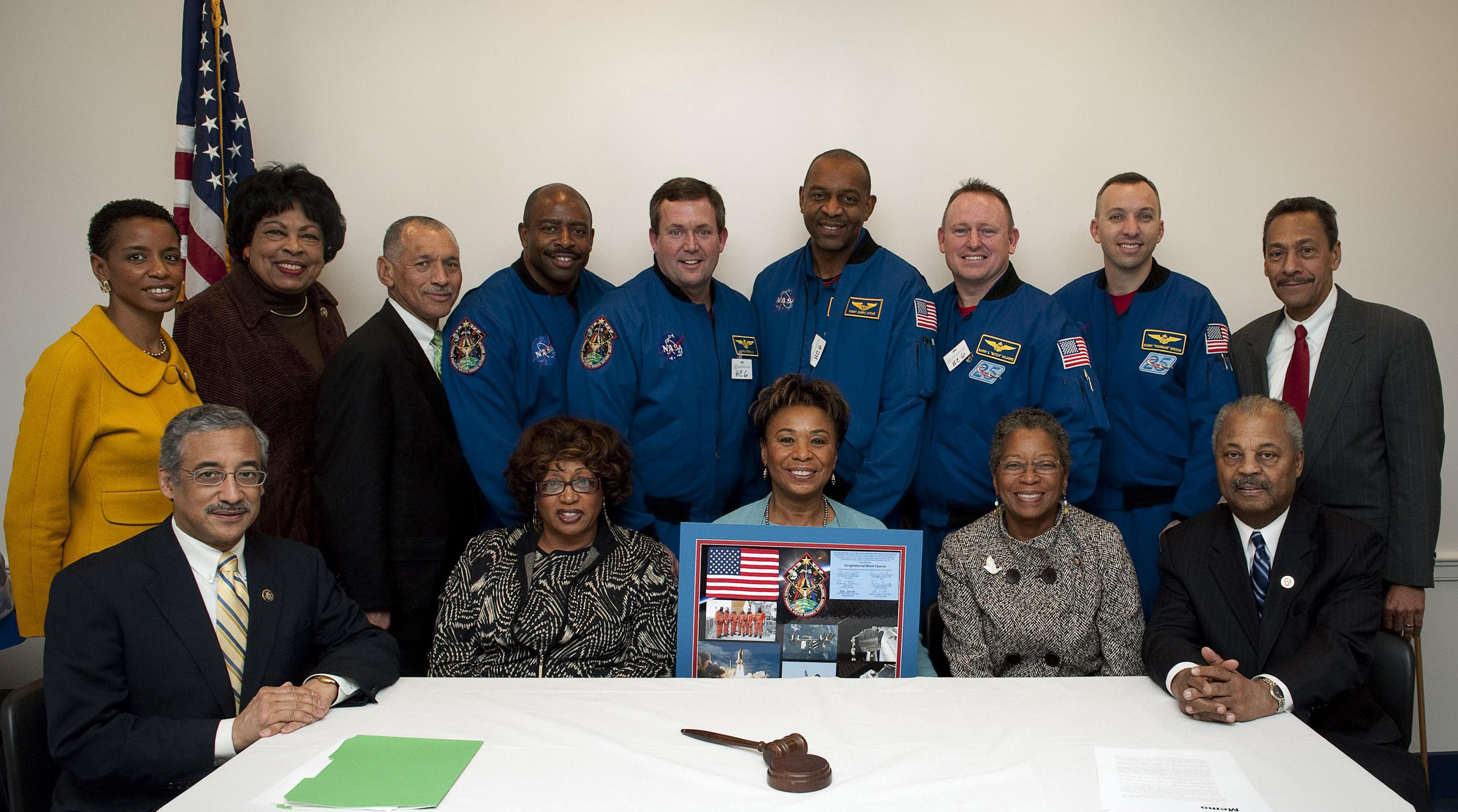
Lee meets with NASA Administrator Charles Bolden and the STS-129 Space Shuttle crew in 2010

==== Environment ====
Lee introduced the Women and Climate Change Act in February 2018. The bill aims to create a Federal Interagency Working Group on Women and Climate Change. Lee said of the bill, "Climate change is already impacting communities around the world with a disproportionate effect on the world's poorest residents. Women make up the majority of the world's poor and are especially vulnerable to abrupt changes in the environment. As leaders in their families, women are called upon to find food and clean water, secure safe housing, and care for loved ones. As climate change worsens, provoking historic droughts, rising sea levels and violent storms, women and girls will bear the brunt of this global crisis".

==== Education ====
Lee is the author of the Shirley A. Chisholm United States−Caribbean Educational Exchange Act, which would enhance U.S. foreign relations with CARICOM nations. This act directs the United States Agency for International Development (USAID) to develop a comprehensive program that extends and expands existing primary and secondary school initiatives in the Caribbean to provide teacher training methods and increased community involvement in school activities. The bill is named for Shirley Chisholm, who helped inspire Lee to become involved in politics when Chisholm ran for the Democratic nomination for president; Lee was the Chisholm campaign's Northern California chair.

==== Black Panthers ====
In 1968, Lee began volunteering at the Black Panther Party's Community Learning Center in Oakland. She also worked on Bobby Seale's 1973 campaign for mayor of Oakland.

Lee disagreed with the National Park Service removing funding for a Black Panther Legacy Project in 2017. She released a statement saying, "It is outrageous that the National Park Service has stripped resources from the Black Panther Party Research, Interpretation & Memory Project. The Black Panther Party was an integral part of the civil rights movement and the public has a right to know their history. I call upon the National Park Service and the Department of [the] Interior to provide a full explanation as to why these critical federal resources have been taken away".

==== Cannabis ====
Lee has supported a number of efforts to reform cannabis laws in Congress. In 2018, she introduced the Marijuana Justice Act to remove cannabis from the Controlled Substances Act, penalize states that enforce cannabis laws disproportionately (regarding race or income status), and enact other social justice-related reforms. Additional legislation Lee has introduced includes the States' Medical Marijuana Property Rights Protection Act, the Veterans Medical Marijuana Safe Harbor Act, the Restraining Excessive Federal Enforcement & Regulations of Cannabis (REFER) Act, and the Realizing Equitable & Sustainable Participation in Emerging Cannabis Trades (RESPECT) Resolution. Lee was an original cosponsor of the Ending Federal Marijuana Prohibition Act when it was first introduced in 2011. In January 2019, she was named a co-chair of the Congressional Cannabis Caucus. In 2020 she co-sponsored the Blumenauer–McClintock–Norton–Lee Amendment.

==== Presidential election objections ====
In 2001, Lee and other House members objected to counting Florida's electoral votes in the 2000 presidential election after a contentious recount. Because no senator joined their objection, it was dismissed by Vice President Al Gore, who lost the election to George W. Bush.

After the 2016 presidential election, Lee objected to Michigan's and West Virginia's electoral votes. Because no senator joined her objections, they were dismissed. Donald Trump won Michigan by slightly over 10,000 votes and West Virginia by over 300,000 votes.

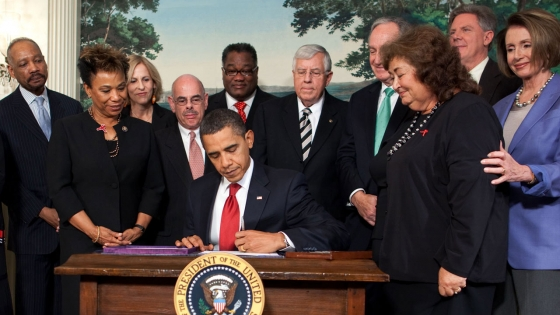
Lee attends a bill signing ceremony in 2009

==== Defense budget ====
Lee called for a 10% cut to the military budget of the United States. She backed an amendment to reduce the size of the $740 billion National Defense Authorization Act for Fiscal Year 2021, but a majority of Democrats and Republicans rejected it.

==== Housing ====
Lee has made affordable housing a top priority, particularly in the East Bay. She has supported and backed legislation meant to expand home ownership opportunities, improve public housing quality, and assist the homeless.

==== Health care ====
Lee was strongly critical of the Stupak–Pitts Amendment, which places restrictions on health insurance plans providing coverage for abortions in the context of the Affordable Health Care for America Act. She supports Medicare for All.

==== Abortion ====
Lee is pro-choice. During a September 30, 2021, hearing of the House Oversight Committee, she recounted having to travel to Mexico for a back-alley abortion in the 1960s: "I'm sharing my story even though I truly believe it is personal and really nobody's business— and certainly not the business of politicians. But I'm compelled to speak out because of the real risks of the clock being turned back to those days before Roe v. Wade." Lee opposed the 2022 overturning of Roe, which she called an "attack on reproductive freedom" and blamed on a "decades-long coordinated strategic assault on women's rights by right-wing extremists".

==== Death penalty ====
In 2002, Lee's opposition to the death penalty was recognized by Death Penalty Focus, which gave her the Mario Cuomo Act of Courage Award.

==== Louis Farrakhan ====
In March 2018, Lee said, "I unequivocally condemn Minister Farrakhan's anti-Semitic and hateful comments."

=== Committee assignments ===
For the 118th Congress:

- Committee on Appropriations
  - Subcommittee on Agriculture, Rural Development, Food and Drug Administration, and Related Agencies
  - Subcommittee on Labor, Health and Human Services, Education, and Related Agencies
  - Subcommittee on State, Foreign Operations, and Related Programs (Ranking Member)
- Committee on the Budget

=== Caucus memberships and leadership ===
- House Democratic Steering Committee (co-chair)
- Medicare for All Caucus
- Task Force on Poverty and Opportunity (chair)
- Congressional Caucus on HIV/AIDS (co-chair)
- Congressional Out of Poverty Caucus (co-chair)
- Congressional Progressive Caucus (former co-chair and former whip)
- Congressional Black Caucus (former chair, 2008–2010)
- Congressional Asian Pacific American Caucus
- Health Care Task Force
- Congressional Caucus on Global Road Safety
- United States Congressional International Conservation Caucus
- Congressional LGBTQ+ Equality Caucus (vice chair and founding member)
- Congressional Social Work Caucus (chair)
- Congressional Arts Caucus
- Congressional HIV/AIDS Caucus (co-founder and co-chair)
- Congressional Pro-Choice Caucus (co-chair)
- Afterschool Caucuses
- Congressional Cannabis Caucus (co-chair)
- Congressional Caucus for the Equal Rights Amendment
- Congressional Wildlife Refuge Caucus

On March 15, 2013, Lee announced the official relaunch of the Congressional Social Work Caucus to the 113th Congress as its new chair.

Lee co-chaired the Congressional Progressive Caucus with Lynn Woolsey from 2005 to 2009. She also chaired the Congressional Black Caucus from 2009 to 2011.

On November 28, 2018, Lee lost an attempt to become chair of the House Democratic Caucus to Hakeem Jeffries.

On November 30, 2018, House Democratic leader Nancy Pelosi announced that she had recommended Lee to become one of three co-chairs of the House Democratic Steering and Policy Committee alongside Rosa DeLauro and Eric Swalwell. The change was approved on December 11, 2018.

=== United Nations assignments ===
Lee was the United States representative to the 68th, 70th, and 72nd sessions of the United Nations General Assembly.

== 2024 U.S. Senate campaign ==
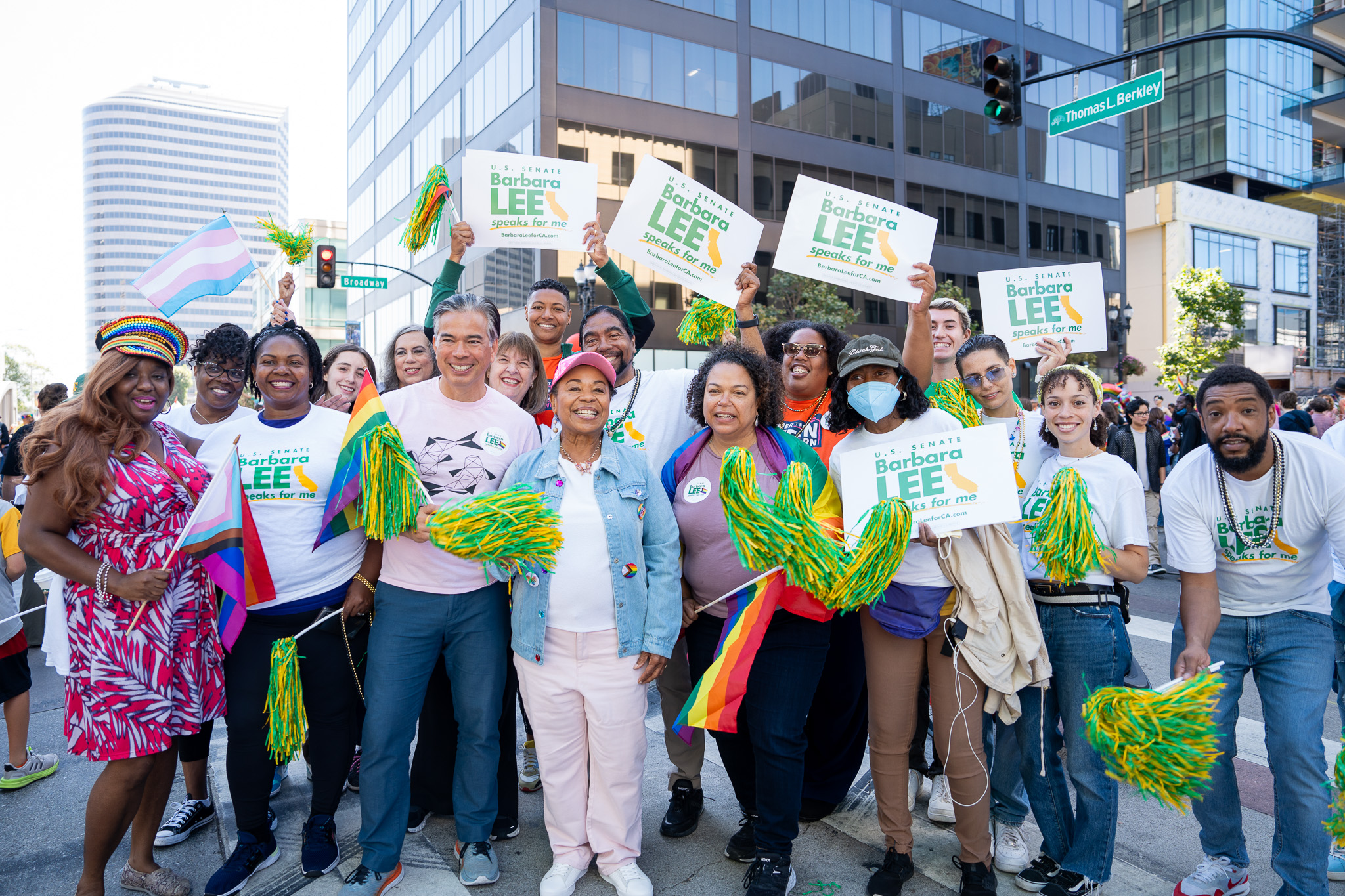
Congresswoman Barbara Lee at Oakland Pride in 2023 with Attorney General Rob Bonta

In January 2023, it was reported that Lee planned to run in the 2024 election for the United States Senate seat held by Dianne Feinstein, after she revealed her intentions to members of the Congressional Black Caucus. The report came a day after Representative Katie Porter announced her own candidacy. A third Democrat, Adam Schiff, had also announced his candidacy. Lee formally launched her Senate campaign in Oakland on February 21, 2023. On September 29, 2023, Feinstein died while serving in office. Governor Gavin Newsom appointed Laphonza Butler to serve out the remainder of the term. On March 5, 2024, Lee failed to advance to the November general election after finishing fourth in the jungle primary. With at least 99% of votes counted, Lee trailed Schiff and Garvey by close to 1.6 million votes, and Porter by about 400,000 votes, with Lee failing to lead in any county. As Lee did not seek re-election to her House of Representatives seat, the defeat also ensured the end of her career in Congress by January 2025.

== Mayor of Oakland ==
=== Campaign ===
Following the 2024 Oakland mayoral recall election, Lee announced that she would run for mayor of Oakland in the 2025 Oakland mayoral special election on January 8, 2025. The election was held on April 15, and Lee was one of 10 candidates who appeared on the ballot in the mayoral race. Initial results showed Loren Taylor earning over 51% percent of the vote in the second ballot. However, multiple media and news organizations called the race for Lee on April 18, three days after the election.

=== Tenure ===
Lee was sworn in during an Oakland City Council meeting on May 20, 2025. She is the first Black woman to serve as mayor of Oakland.

As mayor, Lee publicly endorsed State Senator Scott Wiener's Abundant and Affordable Homes Near Transit Act, which would legalize multi-family housing near all transit stations statewide if passed.

== Personal life ==
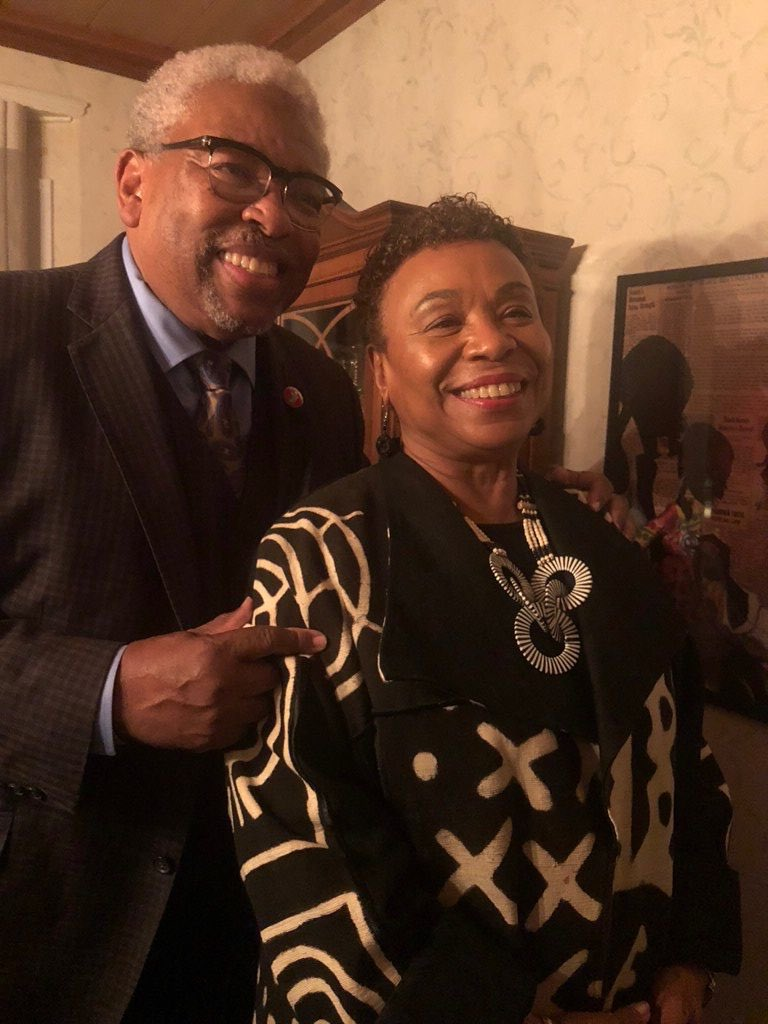
Lee with Rev. Dr. Clyde Oden Jr. on their wedding day on December 31, 2019

Lee married Carl Lee after graduating high school in 1964. She described the marriage as abusive, and she divorced her husband when she was 20. The marriage produced two children, Tony and Craig, whom she raised as a single mother. Both of Lee's sons now work in the insurance industry: Tony Lee is the CEO of Dickerson Employee Benefits, an African-American owned insurance brokerage and consulting firm, and Craig Lee is a senior executive at State Farm.

Lee married Rev. Dr. Clyde Oden Jr., a retired pastor from Oxnard, on New Year's Eve in 2019. They live together in Oakland.

In 2002, the Peace Abbey in Boston gave Lee the Courage of Conscience Award for her vote against the call to war after the September 11 attacks. In her speech, she said, "let us not become the evil that we deplore."

In 2003, Lee was recognized as a Woman of Peace at the Global Exchange Human Rights Awards in San Francisco with Bianca Jagger, Arundhati Roy and Kathy Kelly. In 2010, Lee took the food stamp challenge and also appeared in the documentary film Food Stamped.

In 2014, Lee, Hill Harper, and Meagan Good contributed to Enitan Bereola II's bestselling book Gentlewoman: Etiquette for a Lady, from a Gentleman.

In 2015, Lee won the 43rd Thomas Merton Award.

Lee is an honorary member of Sigma Gamma Rho.

== Publications ==
=== Articles ===
- Why lack of diversity in our foreign policy workforce is a problem for diplomacy, The Hill, February 29, 2024

== See also ==
- Abby Ginzberg, director and producer of the documentary Truth to Power: Barbara Lee Speaks for Me
- Jeannette Rankin, the only member of Congress to vote against American entry into World War II
- Shirley Chisholm, the first African-American woman to be elected to Congress and run for the Democratic presidential nomination
- List of African-American United States representatives
- List of African-American United States Senate candidates
- Women in the United States House of Representatives

U.S. House of Representatives
Preceded by Ron Dellums	Member of the U.S. House of Representatives from California's 9th congressional district 1998–2013	Succeeded by Jerry McNerney
Preceded by Carolyn Cheeks Kilpatrick	Chair of the Congressional Black Caucus; 2009–2011	Succeeded by Emanuel Cleaver
Preceded by Pete Stark	Member of the U.S. House of Representatives from California's 13th congressional district 2013–2023	Succeeded by John Duarte
Preceded by Nancy Pelosi	Member of the U.S. House of Representatives from California's 12th congressional district 2023–2025	Succeeded by Lateefah Simon
Party political offices
Preceded by Peter DeFazio	Chair of the Congressional Progressive Caucus; 2005–2009; Served alongside: Lynn Woolsey	Succeeded by Raúl Grijalva
Political offices
Preceded by Kevin Jenkins; Acting	Mayor of Oakland; 2025–present	Incumbent
U.S. order of precedence (ceremonial)
Preceded by Ed Royce as Former U.S. Representative	Order of precedence of the United States as Former U.S. Representative	Succeeded by Grace Napolitano as Former U.S. Representative
