= Alameda County Board of Supervisors =

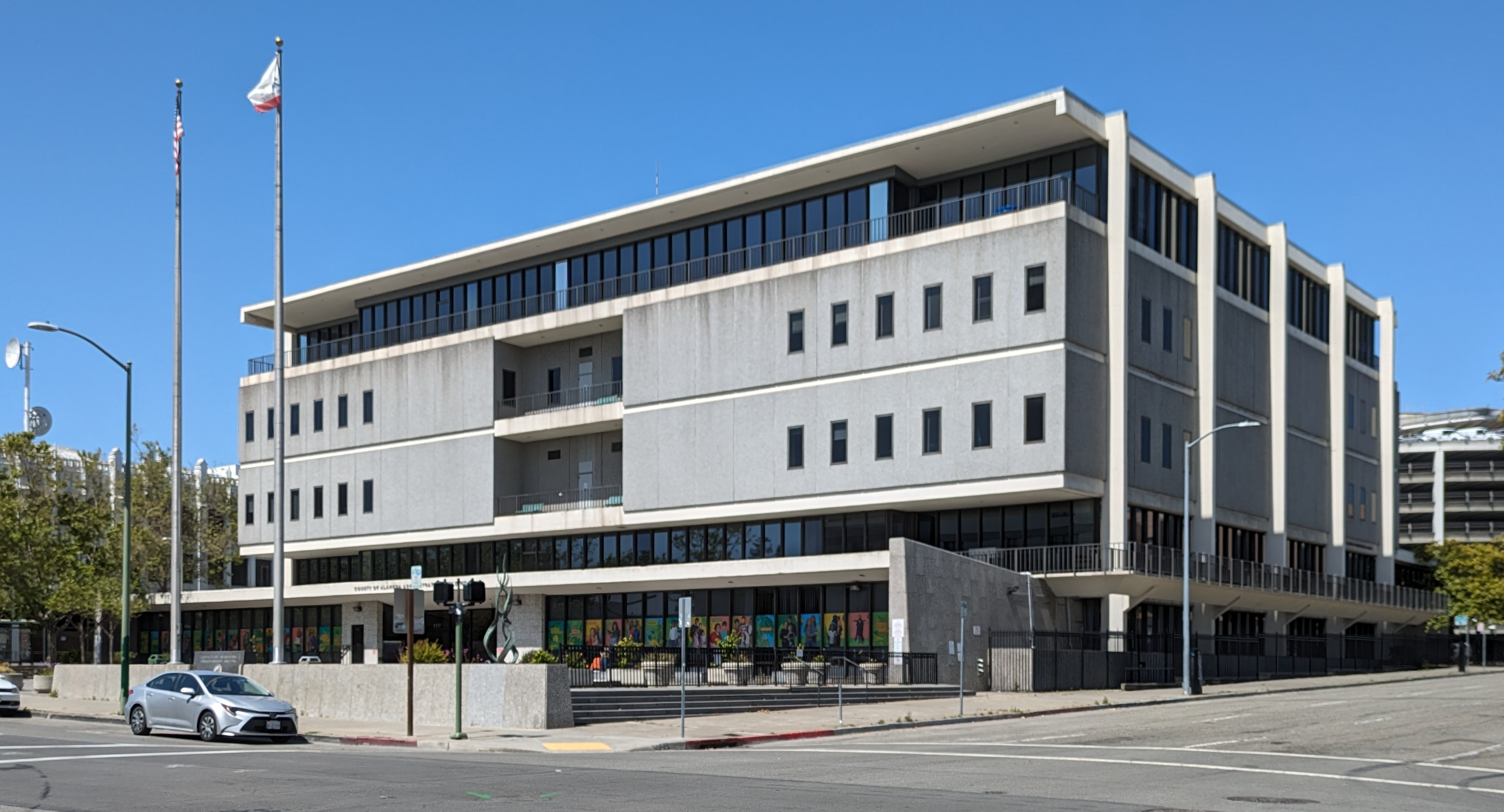
County Administration Building

The Alameda County Board of Supervisors is the five member non-partisan governing board of Alameda County, California. Members of the Board of supervisors are elected from districts, based on their residence.

== History ==
The board was created in 1855, with the first supervisor meeting held at the San Leandro courthouse April 2, 1855. From the creation of the county in 1853 to the creation of the first board of supervisors in 1855, Alameda County was governed by a Court of Sessions, a special provisional form, combining executive, legislative and judicial functions.

== Districts ==
District	Supervisor	Cities & Areas Represented	Party (officially nonpartisan)
1	David Haubert	Dublin & Livermore; most of Fremont; a portion of the unincorporated community of Sunol; and most of the Livermore-Amador Valley	Independent
2	Elisa Márquez	Hayward, Newark & Union City; the northern portion of the city of Fremont; and a portion of the unincorporated community of Sunol	Democratic
3	Lena Tam	Alameda & San Leandro; a portion of the city of Oakland: including the Chinatown, San Antonio, Fruitvale and Melrose areas; the unincorporated communities of San Lorenzo and Hayward Acres; and a portion of the unincorporated community of Ashland.	Democratic
4	Nate Miley	Pleasanton, including the adjacent unincorporated Castlewood and Happy Valley areas; the Lower Hills, South Hills and Elmhurst areas of Oakland; the unincorporated communities of Castro Valley, Cherryland, and Fairview; and most of the unincorporated community of Ashland.	Democratic
5	Nikki Fortunato Bas	Albany, Berkeley, Emeryville, & Piedmont; and a portion of Oakland including: West Oakland, North Oakland, and the North Hills areas.	Democratic

== Governance ==
Within the broad limits established by the State Constitution, State General Law, and the Alameda County Charter, the Board exercises both the legislative and the executive functions of government. The Board of Supervisors is also the governing body for a number of "special districts" within Alameda County.

Boundaries are adjusted every ten years through the process called "redistricting" to make the supervisorial districts equal in population. Redistricting was last completed in 2001. Terms of office for the Supervisors are four years.

Alternate elections are held every two years for three supervisors and then for two supervisors. The salary of the Board members is fixed by the Board itself. A President of the Board, chosen from the membership of the Board every two years, presides at all meetings of the Board and appoints committees to handle work involving the major programs of the County.

== Duties of the Board of Supervisors ==
As defined by the Alameda County Charter, the duties of the Board of Supervisors are as follows:

- Appoint most County officers and employees, except elected officials
- Provide for the compensation of all County officials and employees
- Create officers, boards, and commissions as needed, appointing the members and fixing the terms of office
- Award all contracts for public works.
- Adopt an annual budget.
- Provide, publish, and enforce a complete code of rules prescribing the duties and the systems of * office and management, accounts, and reports for each County department.
- Have an annual audit made of all County accounts, books, and records.
- Supervise the operations of departments and exercise executive and administrative authority throughout County government.
- Serve as appellate body for employee grievances, planning and zoning.

== Board Meetings ==
The Board of Supervisors meets Tuesday mornings at the County Administration Building in Oakland, at 1221 Oak Street. Meetings are open to the public.

== Former supervisors ==
- Tom Bates, 21st mayor of Berkeley
- Thomas E. Caldecott
- Don Perata
- John George
- Warren Widener
- William Dutton Hayward, namesake of the city of Hayward
- Francis K. Shattuck
- Gail Steele was formerly the supervisor of district 2 for 18 years. The Gail Steele Wellness and Recovery Center is named for her. It is located in Hayward, and is a division of the Alameda County Health Care Services Agency and the Behavioral Health Care Services Agency of the county.
- Kent D. Pursel (b 1904, San Francisco), supervisor, 1952-1964+. A section of Interstate 80 was dedicated to his memory.
- Wilma Chan, a member of the board who was killed by a car in 2021.
- Nadia Davis-Lockyer

=== Special appointment ===
Among the candidates being considered for the special appointment to replace Lockyer on the board were local politicians Alberto Torrico, Richard Valle, Mark Salinas, Union City Mayor Mark Green and Ana Apodaca. On June 11, the 4 other board members voted unanimously to appoint Valle as supervisor. He served until November 2012, at which time a special election was held to choose who would serve the final 2 years of the 4-year term. Valle won the election, against Mary Hayashi and Green.
