= List of neighborhoods in Oakland, California =

The following is a listing of the neighborhoods of Oakland, California, categorized into larger area designations of the city.

A broad geographical distinction in Oakland neighborhoods is between "the hills" and "the flatlands" (or "flats"). The more affluent neighborhoods are located in the hills along the northeast side of the city, while neighborhoods are generally less prosperous the nearer they are located to San Francisco Bay. Downtown and West Oakland are located entirely in the flatlands, while North and East Oakland incorporate lower hills and flatlands neighborhoods. This hills/flatlands division extends beyond Oakland's borders into neighboring cities in the East Bay's urban core such as Berkeley, Hayward, San Leandro, and Richmond.

== Central business district ==
- Chinatown
- City Center
- Civic Center
- Jack London District
- Jack London Square/Waterfront
- Lakeside Apartments District
- Northgate/Waverly
- Old Oakland
- Laney College
- Uptown

== East Oakland ==
Fruitvale

- Dimond District
- Laurel
- Allendale
- Peralta Hacienda

Middle East Oakland

- Havenscourt
- Lockwood Gardens
- Maxwell Park
- Melrose
- Millsmont
- Oakmore
- Ridgemont
- Seminary

San Antonio

- Lynn
- Tuxedo
- Reservoir Hill
- Cleveland Heights
- Bella Vista
- Highland Park
- Highland Terrace
- Meadow Brook
- Ivy Hill
- Clinton
- Rancho San Antonio
- Oak Tree
- Merritt
- East Peralta/Eastlake
- Jingletown

Elmhurst

- Brookfield Village
- Eastmont
- Sobrante Park
- Oak Knoll
- Columbia Gardens

== Lake Merritt ==
"Lake Merritt" is used to refer to the lake itself, and to the residential neighborhoods and commercial districts in its vicinity.

- Adams Point
- Eastlake/Merritt
- Grand Lake (A portmanteau of Grand and Lakeshore Avenues)
- Lake Merritt (the body of water)
- Lakeside Apartments District
- Westlake/Oak Glen Park

== North Oakland ==
- Broadway Auto Row
- Bushrod
- Golden Gate
- Longfellow
- Mosswood Park
- Oak Glen Park/Richmond Boulevard
- Piedmont (separate city surrounded by Oakland)
- Piedmont Avenue
- Pill Hill
- Rockridge
- Santa Fe
- Temescal

== West Oakland ==
- Acorn
- Cypress Village
- Dogtown
- Ghosttown
- Prescott (aka Lower Bottoms)
- Oakland Point
- Port of Oakland

== Oakland Hills ==
Northeast Hills

- Claremont
- Montclair
- Piedmont Pines
- Panoramic Hill
- Hiller Highlands
- Glen Highlands
- Merriwood
- Mountain View Cemetery
- Saint Mary Cemetery
- Forestland
- Shepherd Canyon
- Upper Rockridge
- Montclair Business District
- Oakmore
- Lake Temescal
- Joaquin Miller Park

Lower Hills District

- Crocker Highlands
- Glenview
- Lakeshore
- Lincoln Highlands
- Redwood Heights
- Trestle Glen
- Upper Dimond
- Upper Laurel

Southeast Hills

- Crestmont
- Grass Valley
- Sequoyah Heights
- Sheffield Village
- Skyline-Hillcrest Estates
- Caballo Hills
- Leona Heights
- Chabot Park
- Woodminster
