= East Oakland, Oakland, California =

East Oakland
- Neighborhood of Oakland
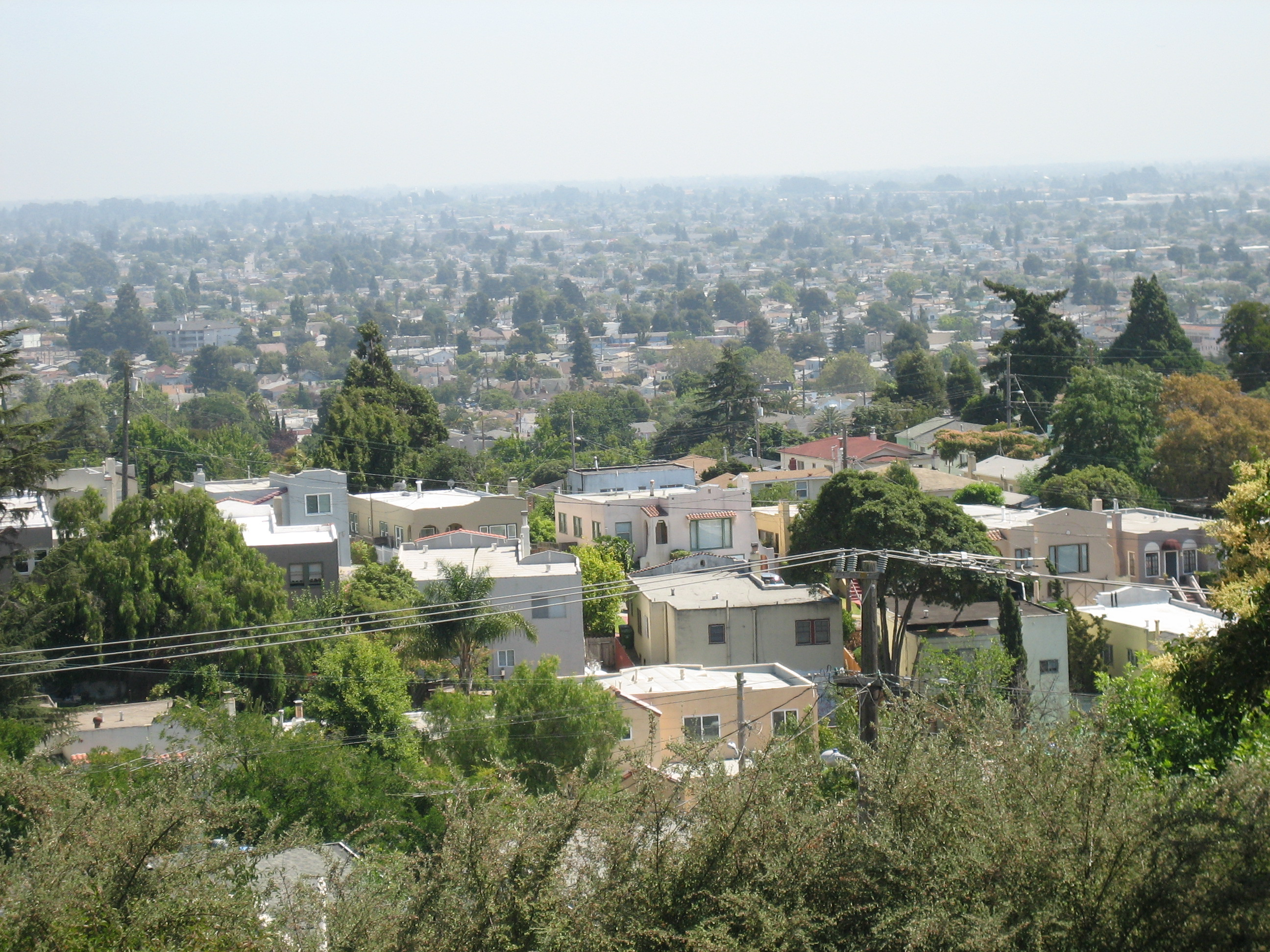
- View of East Oakland from Maxwell Park
- Nickname: "E.S.O."
- East Oakland, California
- Coordinates: 37.779722°N 122.220278°W
- Country: United States
- State: California
- County: Alameda
- City: Oakland

East Oakland is a geographical region of Oakland, California, United States, that stretches between Lake Merritt in the northwest and San Leandro in the southeast. As the southeastern portion of the city, East Oakland takes up the largest portion of the city's land area.

The area is a major hub of Northern California's black community, with over 50% of East Oakland's inhabitants being black. According to figures from a 2000 U.S. Census, over 87,000 people reside in the East Oakland area.

== Geography ==
East Oakland stretches between Lake Merritt in the northwest and San Leandro in the southeast. It generally has a diagonal layout. East Oakland has numbered avenues (1st to 109th) that run northeast to southwest, and numbered streets (East 7th to East 38th) that run northwest to southeast. Interstates 580 and 880 also run northwest to southeast. Main northwest–southeast thoroughfares include East 14th Street (renamed International Blvd. in 1996 within the city of Oakland only), MacArthur Blvd., Foothill Blvd., Bancroft Avenue, and San Leandro Street (being the main one for commercial vehicles). Main northeast-southwest thoroughfares include Fruitvale Ave., 35th Ave., High St., Seminary Ave., 73rd Ave. (which becomes Hegenberger Road south of International Blvd. to Oakland San Francisco Bay Airport), and 98th Ave. East Oakland is home to Holy Names University, Mills College, the Oakland Zoo, the Oakland Coliseum and Oakland Arena.

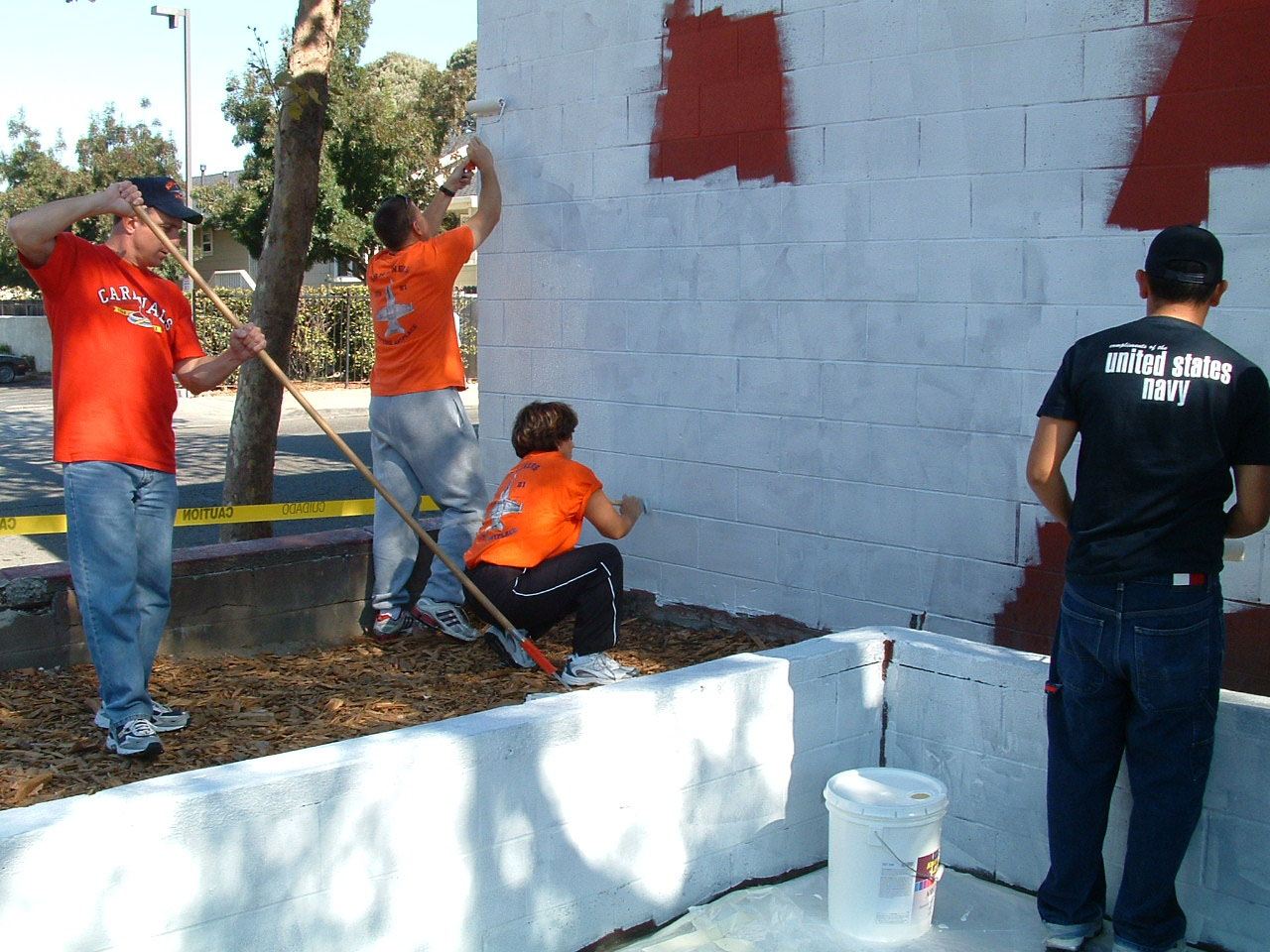
US Navy painting crew at the East Oakland Youth Development Center, 2006

== History ==
East Oakland is a section of Oakland that has experienced many changes to its population as the West attracted immigrants in search of employment. Oakland was declared a city in 1852 where it was prominently populated by people who made it to the west during the Gold Rush. The dominant races that had relocated to the East Bay during the late 1840s were Caucasian, Chinese, Mexican, and African American.

=== Early 1900s ===
By 1910, Oakland had the largest African American population in the East Bay because it tripled in the previous decade as a result of fires and earthquakes in the surrounding areas. Despite the new influx of African Americans, the East Oakland hills were known as “the Bible Belt” because of the white, Protestant community that occupied those houses. This area supported the Ku Klux Klan which shows that even in the East Bay there was racial tension and segregation. In the 1920s, East Oakland was restricted from ethnic minorities unless they worked as servants for whites. Those who did not work as servants were hit by the Great Depression in the late 1920s and early 1930s which caused employment to drop by 41 percent in three years.

=== Surrounding roads ===
In the 19th century, the Oakland-San Leandro Road was a county road connecting Oakland with San Leandro. Along this road, small settlements developed such as Melrose, Elmhurst and Fitchburg. All these were annexed by the city of Oakland after the 1906 San Francisco earthquake. After annexation, the Oakland-San Leandro Road was renamed East 14th Street which lasted for most of the 20th century, until it was renamed International Blvd. Both Foothill Boulevard and MacArthur Boulevard, which run through the heart of East Oakland, were a part of the Lincoln Highway, the first transcontinental highway, from 1913 until 1927.

=== Post WWII ===
In the spring of 1943, there was an increase of immigrants to the Bay Area as a result of World War II; this time is called “the Second Gold Rush”. After the attack on Pearl Harbor, the US government invested large sums of money on defense which created new jobs and opportunities on the coast and in the bay specifically. Because this was shortly after the great depression, many people were unemployed and looking for work, which was in abundance in the Oakland shipyard. Rather than an influx of whites, the new rush caused a surge of racial minorities which caused a restructuring of the demographics in the area. With the increase of workers, a housing crisis soon followed. In the city, there was push back from the Apartment House Owners Association and the Real Estate Board to build more housing so there were only five hundred public housing units built which also resulted in the destruction of other temporary housing units which displaced a large number of immigrants who had been living in them. Immigrants were forced to live in overcrowded quarters and even started sleeping on the streets because the housing that was being built was reserved for whites so minorities were pushed out of the city and forced to relocate to the outskirts of East Oakland. With the redistribution of living, this area, known as Brooklyn (until it was also annexed by the city in 1909) became the backbone of Oakland's African American community and caused an exodus of more prosperous whites to suburbs south and east of the city, such as San Leandro, Hayward and Walnut Creek.

=== Creation of the freeway ===
In the 1950s and 1960s, most areas of East Oakland remained predominantly White. In 1962 construction began on the MacArthur Freeway (580) and providing an alternative route to the Nimitz Freeway. Although some Blacks were displaced when the right of way was cleared, most of the right of way through predominantly White neighborhoods.

=== Lack of property taxes ===
In 1969 the Economic Development Administration (EDA) declared that they would no longer fund large businesses or facilities but rather focus on creating jobs for the unemployed and poor, which in Oakland meant the ethnic minorities. A few years later, in 1978, California passes Proposition 13, officially named the People's Initiative to Limit Property Taxation (Proposition 13 is embodied in Article XIII A of the Constitution of the State of California), which limited the addition of new or increased property taxes and protected property owners against inflation driven increases in assessed valuation. When the property sold the assessed value could be increased to market value. Some have argued that this disadvantaged Blacks seeking to buy property if property values had increased. Some have also argued, post hoc propter hoc, that this somehow caused property values to decline as Whites moved out and Blacks moved in.

If home prices declined as the White/European community departed, then Black/Black African/African American community buying those houses had the benefit of the lower prices, and going forward would pay less in taxes than if prices had not dropped. By the late 1960s buyers in East Oakland were taking advantage of several government backed loan programs to purchase houses. These programs had reduced rates or reduced qualifications, enabling people to buy homes who may not have qualified for conventional financing.

Some argue that these programs further disadvantage the Black population of East Oakland; these critics, instead, advocate using property taxes to pay for programs specifically aimed at the Black population, a position echoed by local and state politicians. .

The mayor at the time, Lionel Wilson, who was the first African American mayor, elected the year prior in 1977, combatted the regulation on property taxes by using many public resources to create investment in downtown Oakland which increased the cost of living in the city and pushed more poor and marginalized populations to surrounding areas such as East Oakland. This is one example of gentrification that has occurred in the city and makes the cost of living higher in the city so the original residents are forced to relocate to the poor, underserved surrounding areas.

With the new availability of jobs created by the EDA, between 1990 and 2000 more Latino and Asian (primarily Cambodian, Lao, and Chinese) immigrants moved to Oakland and specifically Central East Oakland because of how cheap the cost of living was compared to the city. A census on overcrowding showed an increase from 17 to 27 percent because of the new people who moved there. The majority of the new immigrants were Chicano/Latino who had a growth between 150 and 400 percent in that decade. That same time saw a decline in the African American population between 17 and 31 percent.

== Demographics ==
Fruitvale, nicknamed the "Fruit Loop by locals, has become the backbone of Oakland's Latino community, in which East Oakland had a rapid increase of 132% of Latinos between 1990 and 2000. Latinos make up 38% of the population of East Oakland. There is also a diverse Asian population, including Chinese, Vietnamese, Lao, and other southeast Asian ethnic groups generally inhabit the area of East Oakland closest to downtown, from Chinatown east to San Antonio. Asians make up smaller percentage of only 4% of the population, but between 1990 and 2000 saw an increase of 13%. Between 1990 and 2000 both the white and black population of East Oakland saw a decrease in their populations by 24% and 16% respectively. Nonetheless, African Americans predominate in East Oakland, where they represent over 54% of East Oakland's residents. The deep east side has a population of roughly 15,000 residents and is 63% African American thus maintaining the highest concentration of African Americans in Northern California and the highest concentration of African Americans in California outside of Los Angeles. The Foothill Square neighborhood in East Oakland, located off of MacArthur Blvd., has the highest concentration of African American residents of any Oakland neighborhood, at 75.4%. Though the population of whites had decreased, they still made up 4% of the population.

With the increase of the population between 1990 and 2000 the number of households in the area increased by 3.4%. The residents work in all kinds of job areas including service, sales, transportation, construction, and even management and professional positions while 9.1% of the population is unemployed. For the whites who stayed, it was often because they were too poor to relocate and saw an unemployment rate of 30%. In dominantly African American neighborhoods, such as Central East Oakland, between 40-70% of the population were without high school diplomas. The Latino population had 50-70% without high school diplomas and 5% with college degrees. Asians saw a smaller amount of the population without education with 39.3% without high school diplomas and 22.8% with bachelor's degrees.

== Culture ==
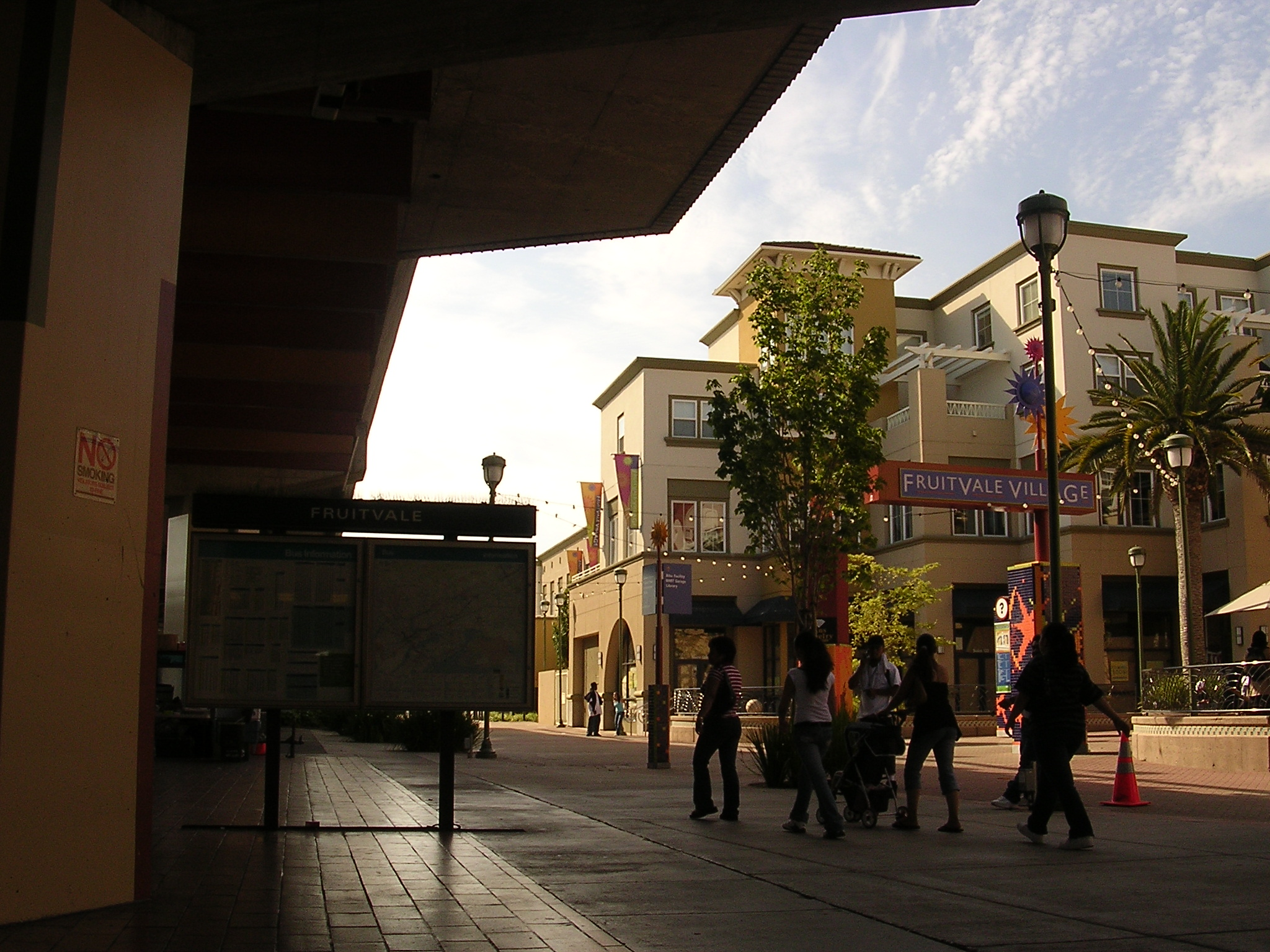
Fruitvale Village by the Fruitvale BART Station

East Oakland, together with West Oakland and portions of North Oakland, is a hub for Northern California's African American community. Hip hop culture is associated with East Oakland. It is known within the hip hop community as "Oaktown", "O-Town" (old school names), or currently, "The Town". A number of East Bay rappers and singers such as Raphael Saadiq, Keak da Sneak, Dru Down, Too Short, Digital Underground, MC Hammer, Luniz, Hieroglyphics, Keyshia Cole, Philthy Rich, Db tha General, Shady Nate, and Bobby Brackins originated there. The prostitution, violence and drug culture of the region spawned a new subgenre of hip hop by the late 1980s. Rappers like Too Short incorporated drugs, violence, prostitution and gang life into their music, in sharp contrast to much of the East Coast hip hop of the day. Too Short was also one of the first rap artists to promote and sell records independently and is one of the pioneers responsible for the birth of Northern California's independent hip hop scene; leading other artists to pursue success in the music industry without the assistance of a major record company. The sound of the music was different from East Coast hip hop, which is known for its technique of sampling and looping to create a song. Instead, funk and blues were infused with synthesizers and drum machines, giving birth to the Bay Area hip hop sound known as Mobb music. Today, mainstream hip-hop continues to lyrically and musically incorporate much of what was pioneered in East Oakland.

== Neighborhoods ==
=== Elmhurst ===
Elmhurst was originally a separate town, it was annexed by Oakland in 1909, and today is considered part of East Oakland. Although it was historically a white working-class neighborhood, it became predominantly African American after World War II, and today, Latinos now form about half of Elmhurst's population. Elmhurst was the site of one of the large carbarns for the Key System's streetcars, the Elmhurst Carhouse. Chevrolet opened an auto assembly plant in Elmhurst in 1915, which shut down in the 1960s.

=== Brookfield Village ===
Located near the Oakland San Francisco Bay Airport. The main streets are 98th Avenue and Edes Avenue. The Brookfield District is located from 85th Avenue to 98th Avenue. Brookfield Village stops at the Union Pacific (formerly Southern Pacific) train tracks after Railroad Avenue. Brookfield Village was built during the early 1900s. It later had a home-building boom during World War II in response to the influx of workers needed for the war industries, on land which had been zoned for industrial uses. In the 1990s, the neighborhood held an annual summer get-together called the Never Worry Picnic as a contrast to a crime rate that is 191% higher than the national average.

=== Fruitvale ===
- Dimond District
- Laurel
- Peralta Hacienda
- Jingle Town

=== Lower Hills District ===
- Crocker Highlands
- Glenview
- Grass Valley
- Lakeshore
- Lincoln Highlands
- Tuxedo
- Redwood Heights
- Crestmont

=== Deep East Oakland ===
- Arcadia Park
- Arroyo Viejo
- Blandon/Glenly/Fontaine
- Brookfield Village
- Canyon Oaks
- Castlemont
- Castlewood/Flintridge
- Coliseum
- Columbia Gardens
- Cox
- Durant Square
- Eastmont, Oakland, California, the location of Eastmont Town Center, the last surviving indoor shopping mall in Oakland. Now made into a center for the elderly as well as doctor's offices. And grocery stores and CVS.
- Eastmont Hills
- Fairfax District, a distinct business district centered on the intersection of Fairfax Avenue and Foothill Boulevard. The Fairfax Theatre building keynotes the district. Each East Oakland business district historically had its own movie theatre.
- Fitchburg
- Foothill Square
- Frick
- The Gate
- Greenridge Drive
- Havenscourt
- Hegenberger
- Highland
- Iveywood
- Las Palmas
- Malcolm Heights
- Maxwell Park
- Melrose
- Mills Gardens
- Millsmont
- Monte Vista Villas
- Lockwood Gardens
- North Stonehurst
- Oak Knoll
- Ridgemont
- San Antonio, which includes smaller neighborhoods such as The Twomps and Jingletown.
- Seminary. This neighborhood includes Mills College.
- Seneca Toler
- Sequoyah
- Sequoyah Heights, part of the larger Oak Knoll neighborhood
- Sobrante Park
- South Stonehurst
- Toler Heights
- Woodland

== Health disparities ==
=== Life expectancy ===
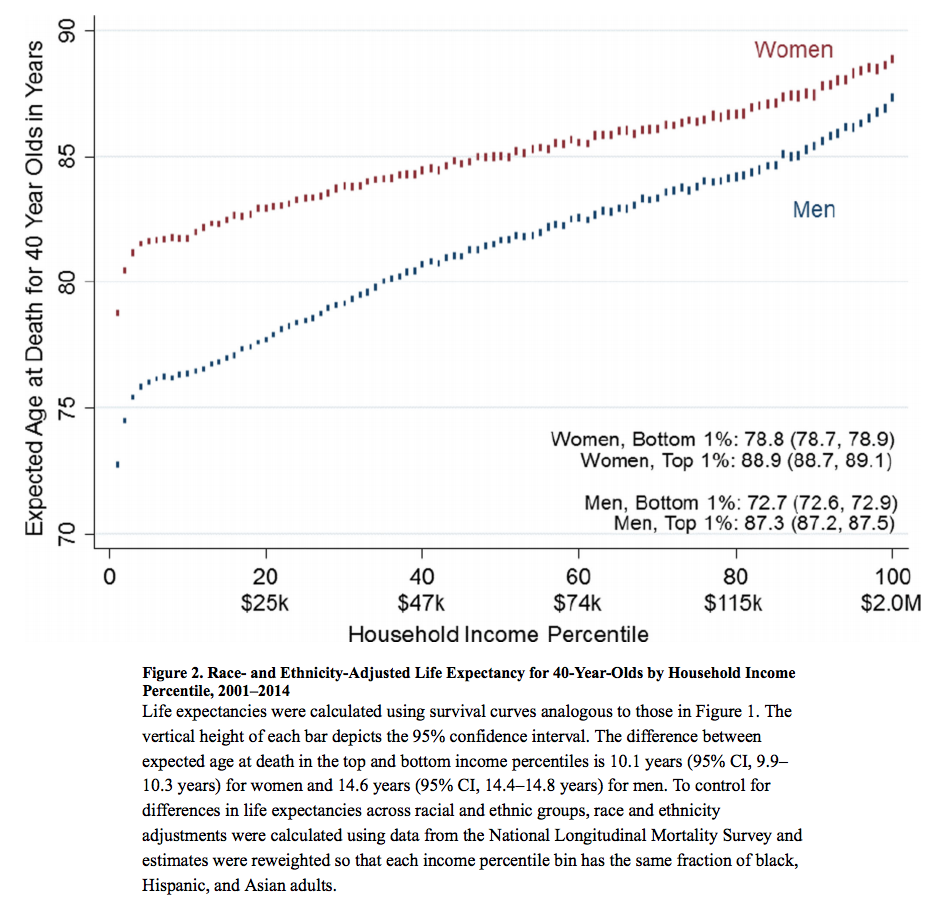
Life expectancies were calculated using survival curves. The vertical height of each bar depicts the 95% confidence interval. The difference between expected age at death in the top and bottom income percentiles is 10.1 years (95% CI, 9.9–10.3 years) for women and 14.6 years (95% CI, 14.4–14.8 years) for men. To control for differences in life expectancies across racial and ethnic groups, race and ethnicity adjustments were calculated using data from the National Longitudinal Mortality Survey and estimates were re-weighted so that each income percentile bin has the same fraction of black, Hispanic, and Asian adults.

East Oakland experiences a lower life expectancy, relative to nearby neighborhoods like Alameda County, approximating 72 years. Amongst the heavily populated races present within Oakland, Hispanics lead in life expectancy, averaging 82 years. African Americans and Whites typically average 67–68 years within Oakland, while Asians live nearly 78 years. Conversely, there is a high all-cause mortality rate amongst the East Oakland community, leading in cancer, stroke, heart disease, and homicide death rates. It is found that communities and families of lower socioeconomic status typically experience higher mortality rates and lower survival rates compared to those from higher socioeconomic status.

=== Health conditions ===
East Oakland displays a significantly higher rate of common health conditions, with residents cumulatively experiencing 32% obesity, compared to 21% amongst all of California. Nearly 32% of adults in the community is at fair or poor health, relative to Alameda County's 15% and California's 16%. Similar patterns are also prevalent in children ages 0–17, with approximately 48% of children diagnosed with obesity, compared to 29% within the state of California. 13% of children in East Oakland also experience fair or poor health, a rate much higher than that of California (7%) or Alameda County (5%). Amongst older adults, due to increases in disabilities (accounting for 42% of disabilities), there is a greater onset of chronic diseases, accounting for 64% of deaths primarily in cancer, heart diseases, Alzheimer's, stroke, and respiratory diseases. As an effort to improve these existing conditions, East Oakland has become one of 14 different site across the state of California to participate in a 10-year comprehensive community initiative dedicated to improving and supporting a healthy community through active collaborations among youths, residents, and community partners within three Action Teams: Health Happens in Schools, Health Happens in Neighborhoods and Health Happens through Culture, Arts, Storytelling & Healing.

=== Healthcare access ===
Adults in East Oakland are more likely to visit emergency rooms than go to doctor's visits within the past year than many other counties in the Bay Area and in the entire state of California. In 2012, 35% of the community did not meet with their doctor that year, related to how 30% of residents utilized emergency rooms (ERs) at least once that year (compared to 13% in Alameda County and 18% in all of California). Amongst all ER visits, Blacks and Hispanics had the most frequent visits in 2011, with four times more visits compared to whites and Asian/Pacific Islanders. Furthermore, even when having healthcare coverage, Black people continue to be the highest users of the emergency department: 15% are enrolled in governmental programs while making up 43% of frequent ER users. Amongst elderly adults, rising numbers in disabilities have resulted in increased hospital emergency visits. Heart disease, leading in chronic diseases amongst elders, accounts for over 19,500 hospitalizations each year. However, racial, linguistic, cultural, and cost barriers continue to influence level of access amongst the population.

=== Healthcare coverage ===
East Oakland ranks amongst the lowest communities to provide healthcare coverage to adults and children. 52% of adults and 40% of children remain insured by private insurance companies, compared to 61% and 57% coverage throughout the state of California. East Oakland residents are one of the higher users of governmental health programs like Medi-Cal and Medicare, covering 27% of adults and 58% of children in the population, almost 30% higher than that of California. In the elderly population, 98% of older adults within the entire Alameda County have health insurance. However, due to rising costs in medical care in recent decades, the California Health Interview Survey observed that 48.5% of adults age 60+ let go of their insurance coverage.

Amongst Hispanics, nearly 74% were enrolled in government health insurance, such as Medi-Cal and Healthy Families. Median income amongst enrolled Hispanic families is $16,800, whereas non-enrolled Hispanics receive a median annual income of $19,200. The average family household enrolled in health insurance amongst Hispanics is approximately 4-6 people.

== Food and liquor stores ==
The socioeconomic disparities that affect the East Oakland community also manifest as food scarcity, compounded by a paucity of fresh foods and grocery stores within the area. Academic interviews of East Oakland residents have found that locals consider food as one of the highest priorities, coming second only to shelter. Interviewees in this study expressed understanding of how to eat healthy and the importance of nutrition, but must prioritize the availability and price of food over its nutritional benefits (or lack thereof).

With the changes in state funding to housing and the movement of impoverished groups in the 1930s, East Oakland became an area where poorer people lived which also resulted in a major loss of industry as businesses and markets started to close down and relocate to more financially sustainable areas. As time went on, supermarkets and other businesses saw East Oakland as an “undesirable place for residential and commercial investment” so few new stores opened up in place of the ones that left. The smaller commercial stores that did stick around were forced to raise the prices of their food and focus more on selling alcohol and tobacco products to stay afloat. In the flatlands of East Oakland there are only four supermarkets and over 40 liquor stores. Alcohol was easy to sell and made the stores more money, but the number of liquor stores is proportional to the levels of crime in violence in the area. Additionally, the majority of the population of East Oakland are Latinos and African Americans, both groups who have higher predisposition to alcohol-related diseases.

As far as the stores that do sell food, a study by YPAR (Youth Participatory Action Research) 2.0 showed that the most available foods were chips, soda, and candy. Because it is cheap and available, these are the foods that people buy although they have little to no nutritional value and make people at a higher risk for diabetes, obesity, and other health problems. YPAR 2.0 is a method of conducting research done by the youth in the community to try and address the problems they and their families face. By going across East Oakland and classifying it as a food desert and critiquing the limited access to healthy food, they pushed for liquor and corner stores to have fresh produce and nutritious staple foods visible and affordable to the members of the community. As a result, stores responded and started to sell fresh produce from local farmers and receive deliveries twice a week for fresh produce.

== Notable residents ==
A list of notable people who have lived or currently live in East Oakland:

- Natalia Anciso, artist
- A-Plus, rapper from hip-hop group Souls of Mischief
- Jesus Barraza, artist
- Sway Calloway journalist, producer, radio personality, and rapper
- Keyshia Cole, singer
- Mark Curry, actor, comedian, and host
- Mabel Craft Deering, journalist
- Sheila E., American Music Award and Grammy Award-winning singer, drummer and percussionist
- Vester Lee Flanagan, gunman in the deaths of two U.S. journalists
- MC Hammer, American Music Award and Grammy Award-winning Rap singer, dance artist
- Kamaiyah, rapper
- Keak da Sneak, rapper
- Angelina J. Knox (1819–1896) inventor, abolitionist
- Kreayshawn, rapper
- Damian Lillard, professional basketball player, Portland Trail Blazers
- Numskull, rapper from hip-hop duo, The Luniz
- Phesto, rapper from hip-hop group Souls of Mischief
- Philthy Rich, rapper
- Favianna Rodriguez, artist
- Raphael Saadiq, singer/songwriter and member of Tony! Toni! Toné!
- D'Andre Sams, rapper
- Tajai, rapper from hip-hop group Souls of Mischief
- Too $hort, rapper
- Lateef the Truthspeaker, rapper
- V-Nasty, rapper
- William S. Rice, early 20th-century block print artist
- D'wayne Wiggins, musician and member of Tony! Toni! Toné!
- Yukmouth, rapper from hip-hop duo, The Luniz
- Baba Zumbi, rapper from hip-hop duo, Zion I
- Emilio Castillo, musician and founding member of Tower Of Power
- Stephen "Doc" Kupka, musician and founding member of Tower Of Power
- David Garibaldi (musician), musician and member of Tower Of Power
- Mike Clark (drummer), musician and member of The Headhunters
- Paul Jackson (bassist), musician and member of The Headhunters
