= Sequoyah Heights, Oakland, California =

Neighborhood in Oakland, California

Coordinates: 37°45′58.21″N 122°8′14.07″W

Sequoyah Heights is an affluent, secluded neighborhood in the Oakland Hills, in Oakland, California. The neighborhood has several architecturally prominent 1920s and 1930s houses, surrounding the Sequoyah Country Club and golf course. It overlooks the Interstate 580 above the former Oak Knoll Naval Hospital, and offers views of San Francisco.

It is a smaller part of the Oak Knoll neighborhood that runs alongside the southeastern part of the Oakland hills. The neighborhood borders San Leandro.

Sequoyah Heights is one of East Oakland's safer and more well-to-do neighborhoods, and features a religious preschool. Sequoyah Heights neighbors the Grass Valley neighborhood, home of the Oakland Zoo, the Seminary neighborhood and the site of the now closed Oak Knoll Naval Hospital.
