= Ridgemont =

Ridgemont may refer to:

- Ridgemont, Oakland, California, a neighborhood in Oakland, California
- Ridgemont (Pittsburgh), a neighborhood in Pittsburgh, Pennsylvania
- Ridgemont High School (Ottawa)
- Fast Times at Ridgemont High, a 1982 film starring Sean Penn

== See also ==
- Ridgmont, a village in Bedfordshire in England
