= Chabot Park =

Neighbourhood in California

Coordinates: 37.743294°N 122.123505°W

Chabot Park is located in the Southeastern section of the Oakland Hills. The neighborhood has a population of around 2,845. Chabot Park is in Alameda County. The neighborhood is adjacent to Knowland State Park and the Oakland Zoo.
