= Coliseum College Prep Academy =

Location
- 1390 66th Ave; Oakland, California 94621-3506; United States
- 37°45′31″N 122°11′36″W

Information
- Type: Public
- Established: 2006
- School district: Oakland Unified School District (OUSD)
- Principal: Amy Carozza
- Teaching staff: 50.90 (FTE)
- Grades: 6-12
- Enrollment: 700 (2022–23)
- Student to teacher ratio: 13.75
- Colors: Hunter green, Vegas gold, white
- Mascot: Lion
- Information: 510-879-3232
- Website: https://www.ousd.org/ccpa

Coliseum College Prep Academy, commonly referred to as "CCPA", is a small public secondary school composed of a seven-year combination middle and high school (grades 6–12) located on the Havenscourt campus in East Oakland. It is part of the Oakland Unified School District, and gets its name from its close proximity to the Oakland Coliseum, and its colors from the Coliseum's former baseball team, the Oakland A's.

== Demographics ==
Coliseum College Prep Academy is small school serving 656 students in grades 6-12 during the 2021–22 school year. CCPA's ethnic demographics for the 2012–13 school year consisted of 0.7% Asian, 0.7% Native Hawaiian or Pacific Islander, 85.6% Hispanic or Latino, and 12.6% Black or African American. Of the students, 36.1% were designated as English Learners and 47.0% as Fluent-English-Proficient.

== Campus ==
The Havenscourt campus hosts CCPA and a Health Center (La Clinica).
