= Joseph Knowland State Arboretum and Park =

Park in California, United States

Coordinates: 37°45′19.12″N 122°8′17.78″W

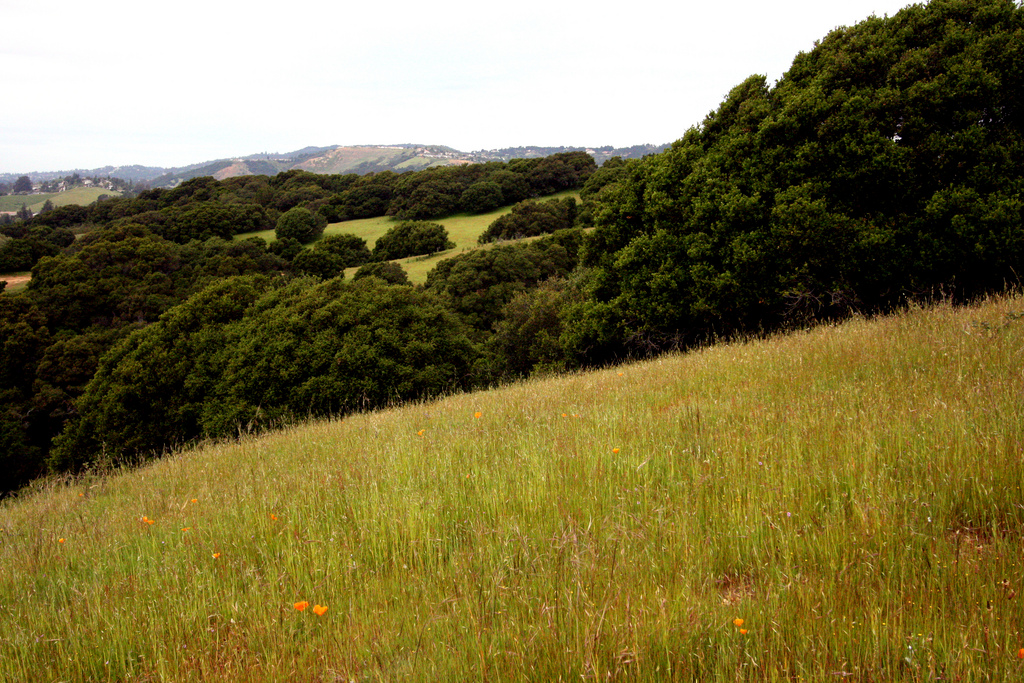
Western Knolls of Knowland Park

Joseph Knowland State Arboretum and Park is a park located in the Grass Valley neighborhood of Oakland, California. It was formerly a state park, and is now the property of the City of Oakland. The Oakland Zoo occupies the developed western lowlands of the park, just off I-580.

== Creation ==
The park's namesake and principal founder was Joseph Knowland, who served on the California State Park Commission from 1934 to 1960 and was its chairman from 1938. Under his influence, the State of California purchased 453 acres (1.83 km^{2}) for $660,000 on a matching grant basis. On April 30 1948, the property became a State Park.

In December 1949, the park was leased to the City of Oakland with the proviso that Knowland Park would always remain a public park. At this time, a portion of the park became the new site of the relocated Oakland Zoo. Joseph Knowland was honored, on the 101st California State Admission Day, September 9 1951, by the City of Oakland, Alameda County, and the State of California, with the renaming of the park to Joseph Knowland State Arboretum and Park. In 1973, the site was ceded to the City of Oakland, and in 1975, management of the park was granted to the City of Oakland.

== About the park ==
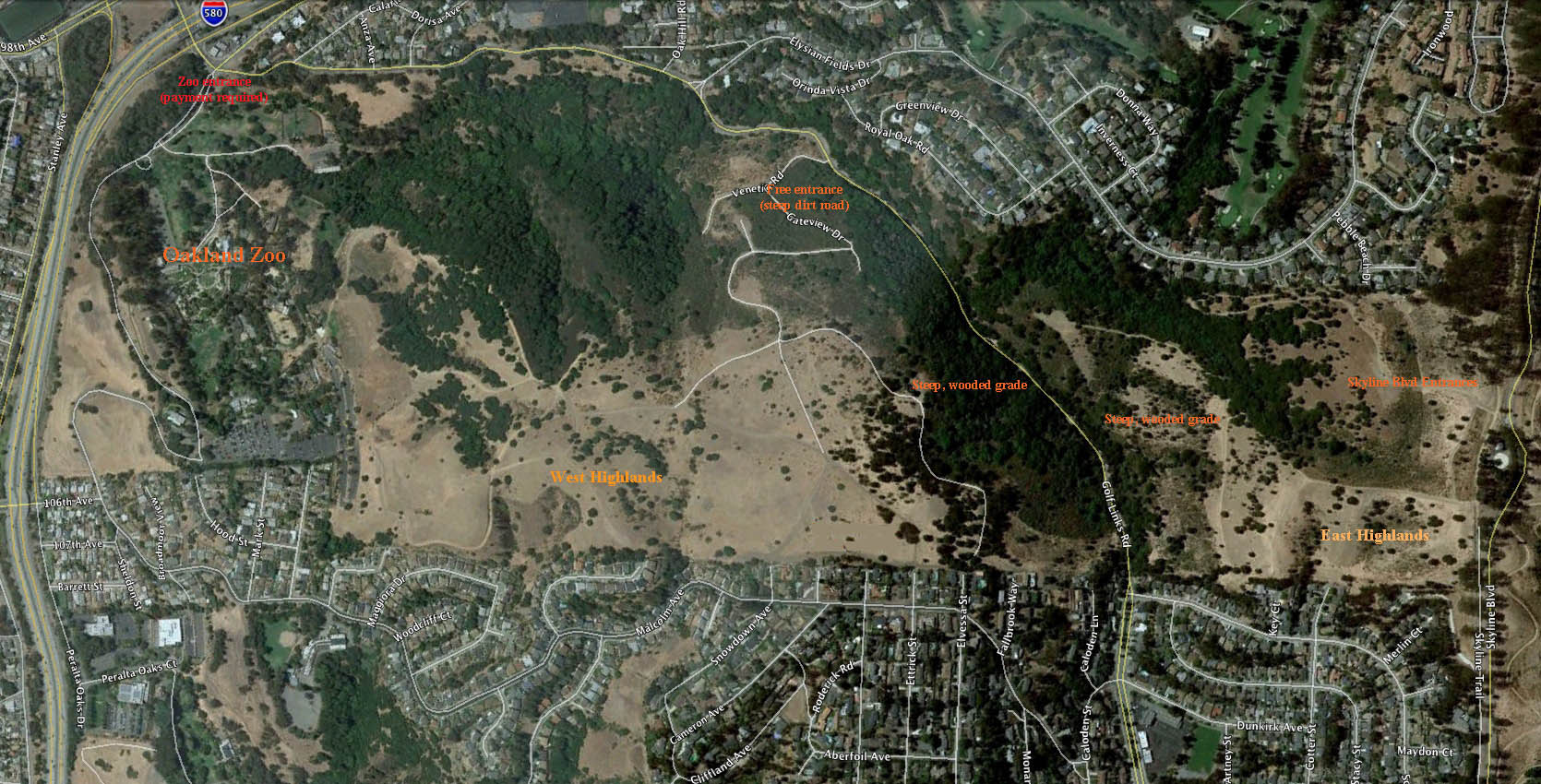
Aerial view of the park with sections of the park labeled

The largest and most pristine portion of the park is undeveloped, and yet is the most accessible to park users. The western highlands and northern slopes are currently a thriving hotspot for rare native plants and wildlife. Some of the natural highlights of the park include rare native plant communities, thriving but threatened wildlife, choice bird-watching locales, and a known-critical migratory corridor for mountain lions and bobcats. The park is traversed along its northern boundary by Arroyo Viejo which flows to Lion Creek and then San Leandro Bay.

In 2010, the East Bay Chapter of the California Native Plant Society (EBCNPS) included Knowland Park in its South Oakland Botanical Priority Protection Area due to its rich native plant resources that include rare natural communities of Valley Needlegrass Grassland and Maritime Chaparral.

== Controversy ==
In 2011, Oakland City Council voted to approve the expansion of the Oakland Zoo into upper Knowland Park. This move has been fiercely contested by the Friends of Knowland Park.

On December 9, 2014, the Oakland City Council voted to block public access to dozens of acres within the heart of the park by granting a mitigation easement to offset the damage that would occur from a planned development by the Oakland Zoo onto the western highland of Knowland Park. The Save Knowland Park Coalition, which includes the Sierra Club - East Bay Chapter, California Native Plant Society, California Grasslands Association, several other environmental organizations as well as the Green Party are supporting a referendum effort to put the issue to a vote of Oakland registered voters.
