= Brookfield Village, Oakland, California =

Coordinates: 37°44′07″N 122°11′10″W

Brookfield Village is an Oakland, California neighborhood located in East Oakland near Oakland International Airport. The main streets are 98th Avenue and Edes Avenue.

Brookfield Village was built during World War II in response to the influx of workers needed for the war industries, on land which had been zoned for industrial uses. It was one of the first suburban style tract house developments in Oakland.

Brookfield Village was developed by Albert Bernhardt and the Stoneon Brothers; a subdivision of over 1200 homes that featured winding, contoured streets lined with shade trees. Its creators advertised it as "a model village on the Pacific Coast."

Damian Lillard, who is a professional National Basketball Association (NBA) player for the Portland Trail Blazers, grew up in Brookfield Village.

== See also ==
- Elmhurst, Oakland, California
- Sobrante Park, Oakland, California
