= Eastmont Town Center =

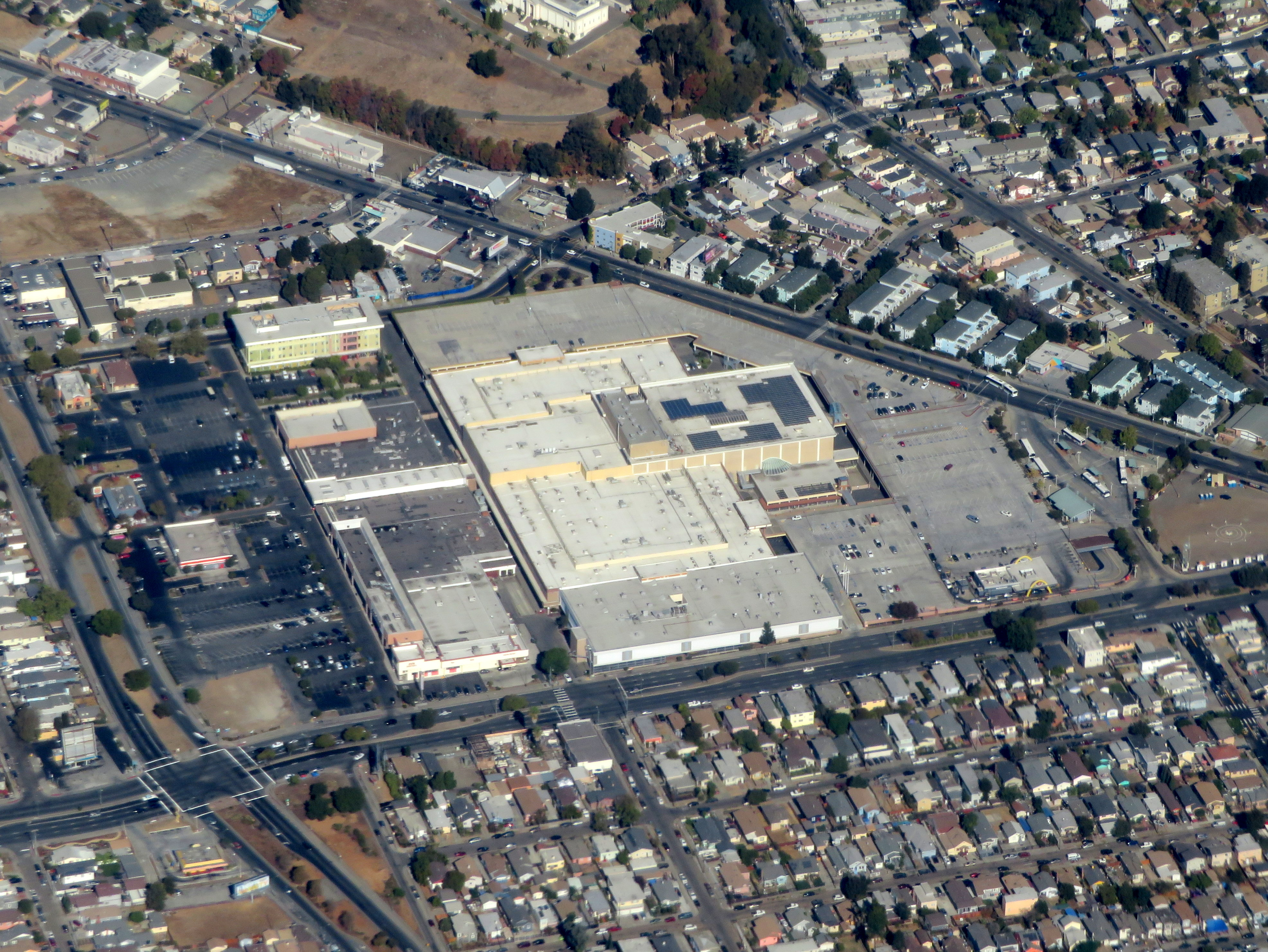
- Aerial view of Eastmont Town Center in October 2020
- Location: Frick, Oakland, California, United States
- Opened: May 18, 1966 (60 years ago)(as a mall)
- Closed: 1997 (as a mall)
- Owner: Tidewater Capital
- Architect: William Pereira

Eastmont Town Center is a mixed-use office and social services complex in East Oakland, California, formerly an enclosed shopping mall known as Eastmont Mall. located on 33 acres (130,000 m^{2}) bounded by Foothill Boulevard, Bancroft Avenue, 73rd Avenue, and Church Street, in the Frick neighborhood of East Oakland. The mall opened in phases between 1966 and 1974 on the site of a 1920s-era Chevrolet automobile factory called Oakland Assembly (itself shut down in 1963 with General Motors moving operations to a new plant in suburban Fremont). Architect William Pereira designed the building. It is physically almost next to, and by entry access a few blocks away from the similarly sized Evergreen Cemetery. The official grand opening ceremony was held in November 1970.

== History ==
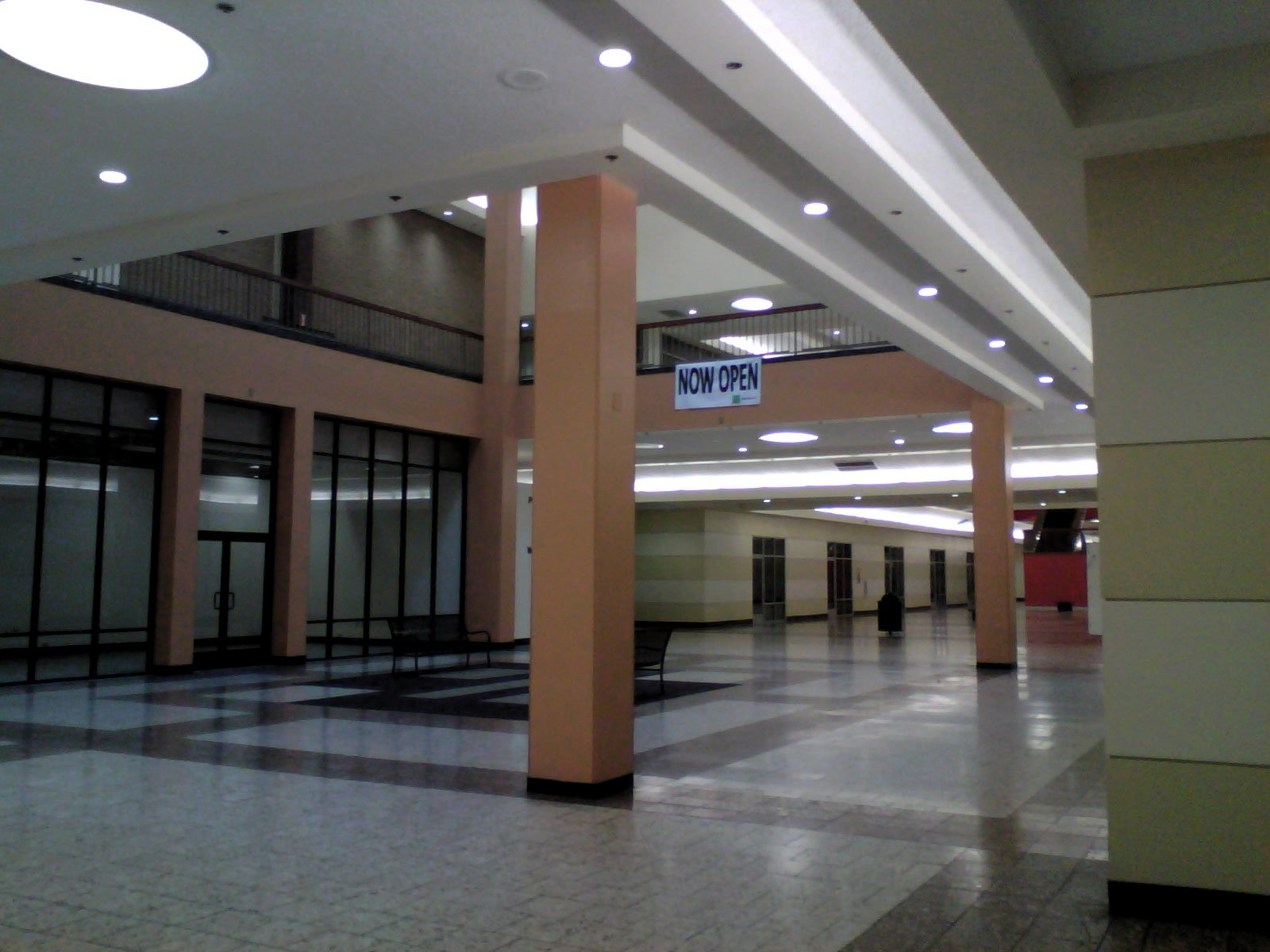
A "dead" corridor inside the mall in 2014

Originally known as Eastmont Mall, the mall was a popular and heavily used shopping destination during most of the 1970s and 1980s, but declined by the 1990s due to a huge drop in the average income level, and a concurrent increase in the crime rate in the mall and the surrounding neighborhoods.

Eastmont's primary anchor tenants were JCPenney, Mervyn's, Woolworth's (including a lunch counter), Safeway, Pay 'n Save, Kinney Shoes, Gallenkamp Shoes and Thom McAn, those three among the nation's leading shoe retailers at the time. Hickory Farms had a location in Eastmont Mall, and there were also branches of Smiths and Roos/Atkins, both popular regional men's clothing stores. The mall also housed a Syufy movie theater, opened in 1971, with four screens. Food choices included Orange Julius, Karmelkorn and the H. Salt Esquire fast-food seafood chain.

There is a four-story standalone building on the property behind (what was) the JCPenney parking structure, which in the early days of the mall was known as the "professional building." Completed in the fall of 1969, it housed temporary employment offices for the department stores in preparation for their openings, as well as various real estate, insurance, financial and medical offices serving the community, but suffered decline with the rest of the mall as the years progressed.

The Safeway store was actually part of the first phase of the mall, a freestanding location fronting Bancroft Avenue. Official groundbreaking ceremonies were held in September 1965, and the Safeway opened in the spring of 1966. The other stores adjacent to it were opened by 1967. The JCPenney wing, first announced in October 1966, began construction in 1968. That store, which officially opened in October 1970, would replace a longtime downtown Oakland location at 11th and Washington streets (which shut down in April 1971), and would be torn down to make way (in part) for the City Center redevelopment project.

The Mervyn's location was first announced in the spring of 1973 for a summer 1974 opening. The opening of the Mervyn's marked the completion of the entire mall.

Eastmont's JCPenney store was notable in that the signage for it, outdoors and at the inside entrances, was never converted to the "JCPenney" logo, rendered in the Helvetica font, introduced chain-wide beginning in 1970 (but not fully implemented in catalogs and print advertising until 1972) and installed in all subsequently built Bay Area locations (including Richmond's Hilltop Mall); the Eastmont location always retained the older "Penneys" logo as originally introduced in 1963, right up until the store shut down (all signage and advertising inside the store itself always conformed to then-current branding). This may have been intentionally done by JCPenney to protect the trademark on the older logo.

Eastmont Mall became the only remaining indoor mall in Oakland after the closure of the mid-1960s-era MacArthur-Broadway Center in North Oakland in the mid-1990s.

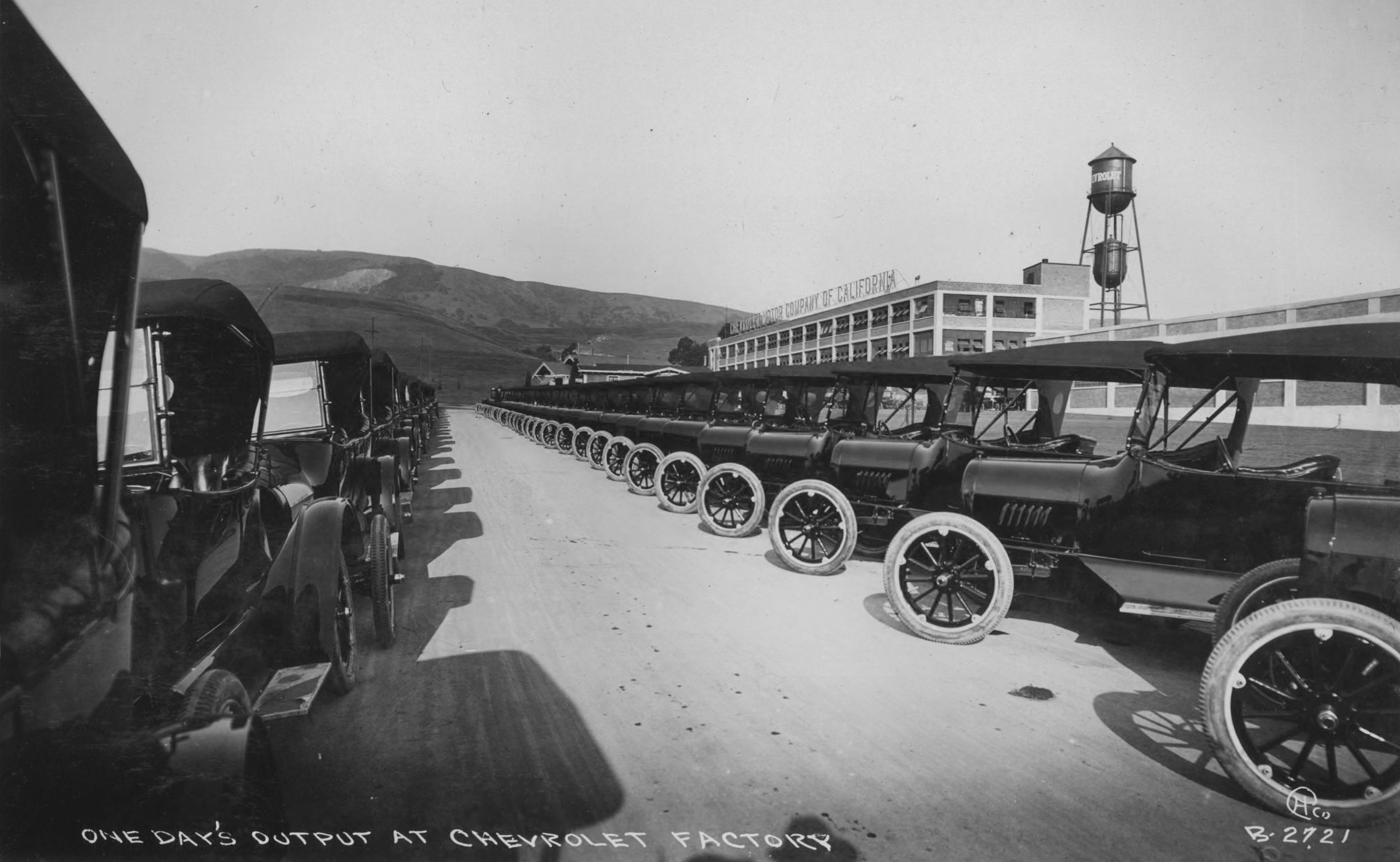
Chevrolet automobile plant production, ca 1917, San Leandro Hills in background.

JCPenney and Mervyn's closed their Eastmont locations in the early 1990s. The former Eastmont Mall was renovated in 1997 and subsequently converted from an enclosed shopping mall into a multi-tenant office property. In the early 2000s, the mall was only 30 percent leased and had fallen into bankruptcy. Local real estate developers purchased the mall in 2000, and emphasized a focus on neighborhood and community services; many of the abandoned retail stores were converted into office space. The Mervyn's location was converted into a substation for the Oakland Police Department and the JCPenney location was converted into a community medical clinic operated by Alameda Health System. A handful of existing retail tenants stayed on, and a few new ones were attracted due to the success of the renovations, including Gazzali's Market (opened 2004), the only supermarket to serve the surrounding neighborhoods (this supermarket was a Safeway, as noted above, during the center's earliest years). In the spring of 2007, the mall was sold to a group of real estate investors based in Oregon.

In 2006–07, the four-story standalone office building was converted as an adaptive reuse project into Miley Gardens, a residential senior housing complex.

A $6 million renovation of the property was completed in July 2008. The interior was brightened, new lighting, skylights and seating areas were installed, escalators and elevators were given an upgrade and the parking areas received new landscaping.

Currently, the mall houses the supermarket, a Social Security office, a branch of the Oakland Public Library, Alameda Health System's Eastmont Wellness Center, General Assistance and WIC offices, and other small businesses and social service organizations. There is a Rainbow discount clothing store, one of the few national retailers in the mall.

Eastmont was sold for $54.5 million in 2015 to Vertical Ventures, a private equity investment firm based in Walnut Creek (one of the East Bay's local suburbs).

== Bus station ==
The Eastmont Transit Center bus station adjacent to the mall opened on March 4, 2001. The Eastmont Transit Center is the second largest bus station in East Oakland after Fruitvale station, serving 15 routes that carry over 25,000 passengers a day combined.

Eastmont Transit Center
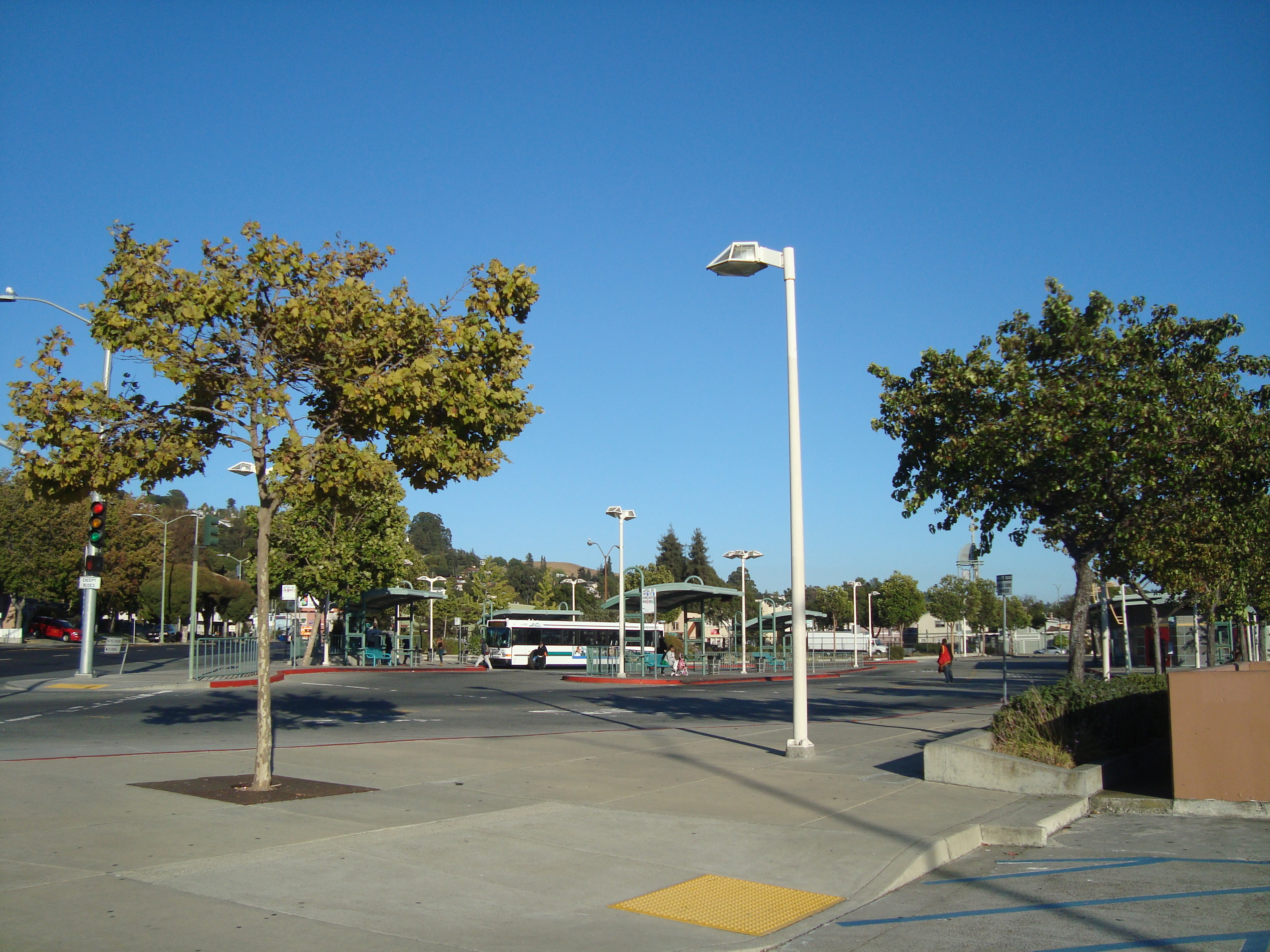
- Eastmont Transit Center in 2014

General information
- Location: 7029-7085 Foothill Boulevard; Oakland, California; United States
- Coordinates: 37.768764°N 122.174138°W
- Lines: AC Transit: NL, NX3, 40, 45, 57, 73, 98, 638, 657, 680, 805, 840; Alameda County East Oakland Shuttle
- Platforms: 9 bays

Construction
- Accessible: Disabled access

History
- Opened: March 4, 2001
Location

=== Bus service ===
The following AC Transit routes serve the Eastmont Transit Center station:

- Local routes 40, 45, 57, 73, and 98
- Limited-stop Transbay routes NL and NX3
- All Nighter routes 805 and 840
- School routes 638, 657, and 680

The fare free Alameda County East Oakland Shuttle also connects the Social Security Administration Office at Eastmont Town Center with Oakland Coliseum station.
