= Lockwood Gardens, Oakland, California =

Housing project and neighborhood in Oakland, California, United States

Coordinates: 37°45′42″N 122°11′48″W

Lockwood Gardens, is a neighborhood and housing project located in East Oakland, California, on 65th and International Boulevard. The neighborhood lies at an elevation of 25 feet (6 m) and is located less than a mile from the Oakland Coliseum. The housing project, operated by the Oakland Housing Authority, contains 372 apartment and townhome units. The area, alongside adjacent Coliseum and Finchburg neighborhoods, is a predominately African-American neighborhood with an important Hispanic minority.

Lockwood is also known as the "6-5 Vill" (Village), and is one half of the "Vill." The other half of the "Vill" is the recently torn down 69th San Antonio Villas housing project, where infamous drug kingpin Felix Mitchell is from. The 69th San Antonio Villas have since been remodeled and is now a mixed-income community. The Oakland Housing Authority also remodeled Lockwood Gardens.
