= Yellow-legged frog =

Yellow-legged frog may refer to:

- Foothill Yellow-legged Frog (Rana boylii), a frog in the family Ranidae found from northern Oregon, down California's west coast, the western Sierra Nevada foothills, and into Baja California
- Southern Mountain Yellow-legged Frog (Rana muscosa), a frog in the family Ranidae endemic to the mountain ranges of Southern California, up to the southern Sierra Nevada in California, United States
- Sierra Nevada Yellow-legged Frog (Rana sierrae), a frog in the family Ranidae endemic to the Sierra Nevada mountains in California and Nevada in the United States
