= Millsmont, Oakland, California =

Coordinates: 37°46′34″N 122°10′33″W

The Millsmont neighborhood located in the foothills of Oakland, California encompasses the area of East Oakland to the south and east of Mills College. Seminary Avenue is considered the northern border, and Edwards Avenue the approximate southern border; MacArthur Boulevard bounds it to the west, and Interstate 580 to the east. It lies at an elevation of 239 feet (73 m).

A view of San Francisco from Outlook Avenue in Millsmont in 2012

Originally a bedroom, almost resort community around the turn of the century, Millsmont (especially between Seminary Avenue and Edwards Avenue and Hillmont Drive and Mountain Boulevard) was built up as a place to get away from the faster pace of San Francisco. Being heavily wooded, it was an ideal place to buy land to which to escape on the weekends. Quarter-acre plots were available, including building plans and materials, for $500. Four standard plans were used to build quaint, one-bedroom dwellings. An original, unaltered house may be seen on the northeastern corner of Edgemoor Place and Sunnymere Avenue. Many Millsmont homes have panoramic views to Alameda and the San Francisco Peninsula to the west and the Oakland hills to the east.

After the earthquake of 1906, many individuals who had been left homeless and penniless settled in their small properties in the Millsmont neighborhood. Additions were built, and the landscape gradually changed.

Today, Millsmont is an eclectic neighborhood, with first-time homeowners; older, established residents (a significant number of families having owned their homes for over 40 years); and students and faculty/staff associated with Mills College.

Millsmont is in the 94605 ZIP code.
