= Eastmont, Oakland, California =

Neighborhood in Oakland, California, United States

Coordinates: 37°46′09″N 122°10′20″W

Eastmont is a neighborhood in Oakland, the county seat of Alameda County, California. It lies at an elevation of 95 feet (29 m). It was formerly an unincorporated community.

The Eastmont Town Center shopping mall and social services center is located in the neighborhood, at 73rd Avenue where Foothill and MacArthur Boulevards meet. The name of MacArthur Boulevard was changed from Excelsior in honor of World War II hero General of the Army Douglas MacArthur.

On March 21, 2009, 2 blocks south of the mall, four Oakland police officers were killed, along with their assailant. This was among the deadliest attacks on law enforcement in California history.

Evergreen Cemetery is located there, and is the burial place for unclaimed victims of the Jonestown mass killing.
