= Roos/Atkins =

American chain of men's clothing stores

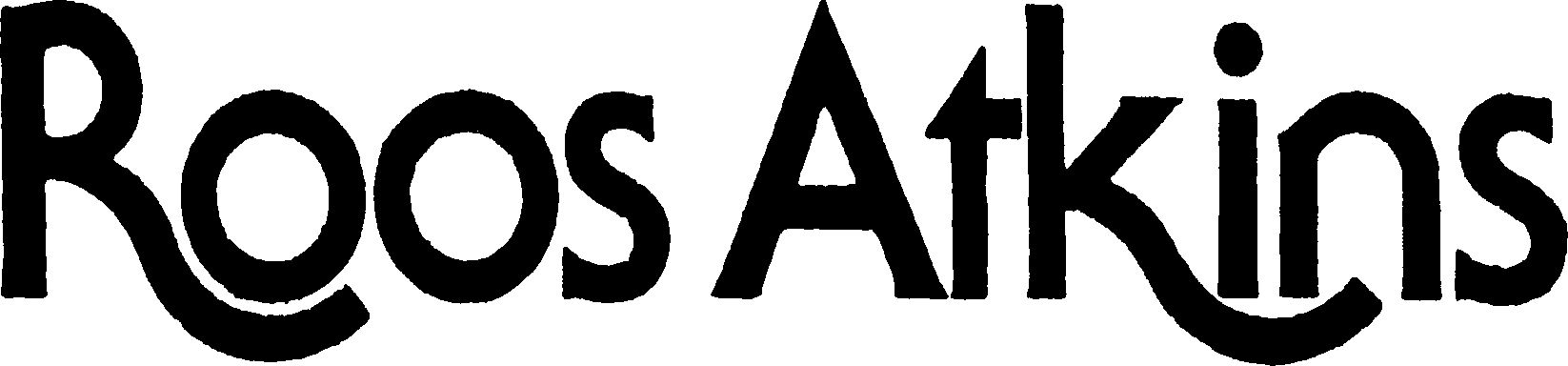
Roos Atkins final logo

Roos/Atkins was the name of a chain of upscale men's clothing stores based in San Francisco, California. It was formed through a 1957 merger of the Robert Atkins and Roos Brothers clothiers. The chain expanded after World War II to include several locations throughout northern California, but declined in the 1980s; by the early 1990s all locations had been closed or sold to other retailers. The brand is mentioned in chapter five of author Thomas Pynchon's novel The Crying of Lot 49.
