= Piedmont Pines, Oakland, California =

Coordinates: 37°49′28.68″N 122°11′39.24″W

Piedmont Pines is an affluent residential neighborhood in the hills of Oakland, California. It is generally bounded by Highway 13 (the Warren Freeway) to the west, Shepherd Canyon Rd. to the north, Skyline Blvd. to the east, and Joaquin Miller Park to the south.

Two Oakland public schools are included in the area, Montera Middle School and Joaquin Miller Elementary School. There is no business section in Piedmont Pines.

Although listed as a distinct district, realtors-architects, city government, and many Piedmont Pines residents have long considered the neighborhood as part of the larger Montclair district. Piedmont Pines is relatively remote from the city center and generally less known than Montclair; many Oaklanders do not seem to know of Piedmont Pines and consider this area to be part of the Montclair district, given that architecturally, geographically, demographically, and economically, the two affluent areas are virtually indistinguishable.

The neighborhood's real estate includes a 1957 mid-century modern mansion by Oakland-born architect Roger Lee and an Arts and Crafts house rented by Grateful Dead sound engineer Owsley Stanley.
