= Oakland Housing Authority =

Housing authority in Oakland, California, United States (USA)

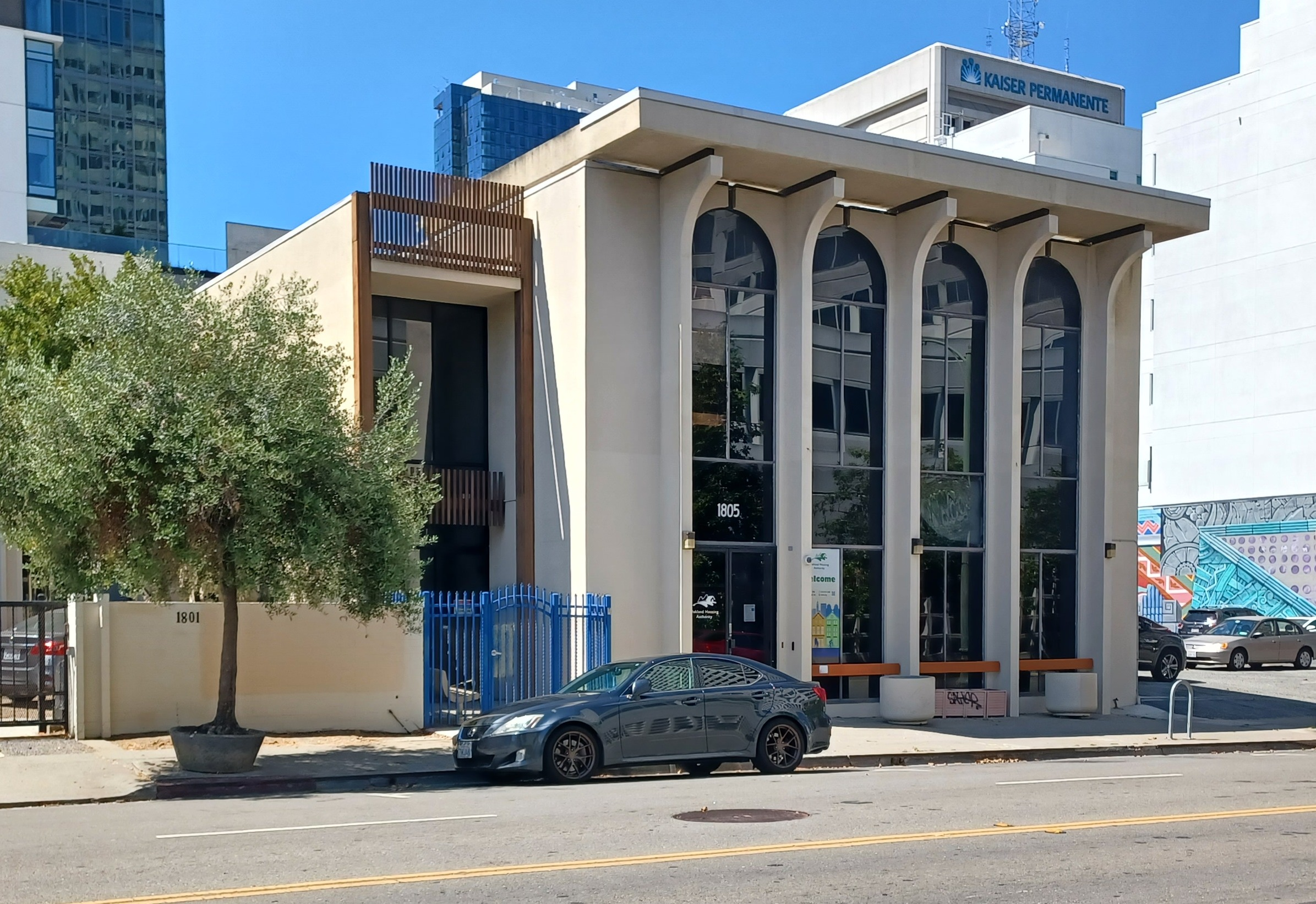
OHA office

The Oakland Housing Authority (OHA) is the public housing agency for the city of Oakland, California.

The Oakland Housing Authority's largest department, the Leased Housing Department, is responsible for administering the Housing Choice Voucher program, otherwise known as the Section 8 program. The Authority periodically opens up its waiting list for new applicants, as the list is normally closed.

== History ==
The Oakland Housing Authority was created in 1938. The first housing project of the Oakland Housing Authority was Campbell Village at Eighth and Campbell in West Oakland. It was funded by the Housing Act of 1937, which required the condemnation and demolition of the exact same number of housing units that would be constructed.

In 1991, a jury convicted 4 Oakland Housing Authority police officers of conspiring to make false arrests, beat and intimidate residents of Oakland Housing Authority. In 1993, the conviction of the officers was affirmed by the United States Court of Appeals for the Ninth Circuit.
