= Seminary, Oakland, California =

Neighborhood in East Oakland

Coordinates: 37°46′3.58″N 122°11′46.04″W

Seminary is a neighborhood in the East Oakland section of Oakland, California. It is located just north of the Elmhurst neighborhood. Seminary's ZIP code is 94621. It is best known for its close proximity to Mills College.

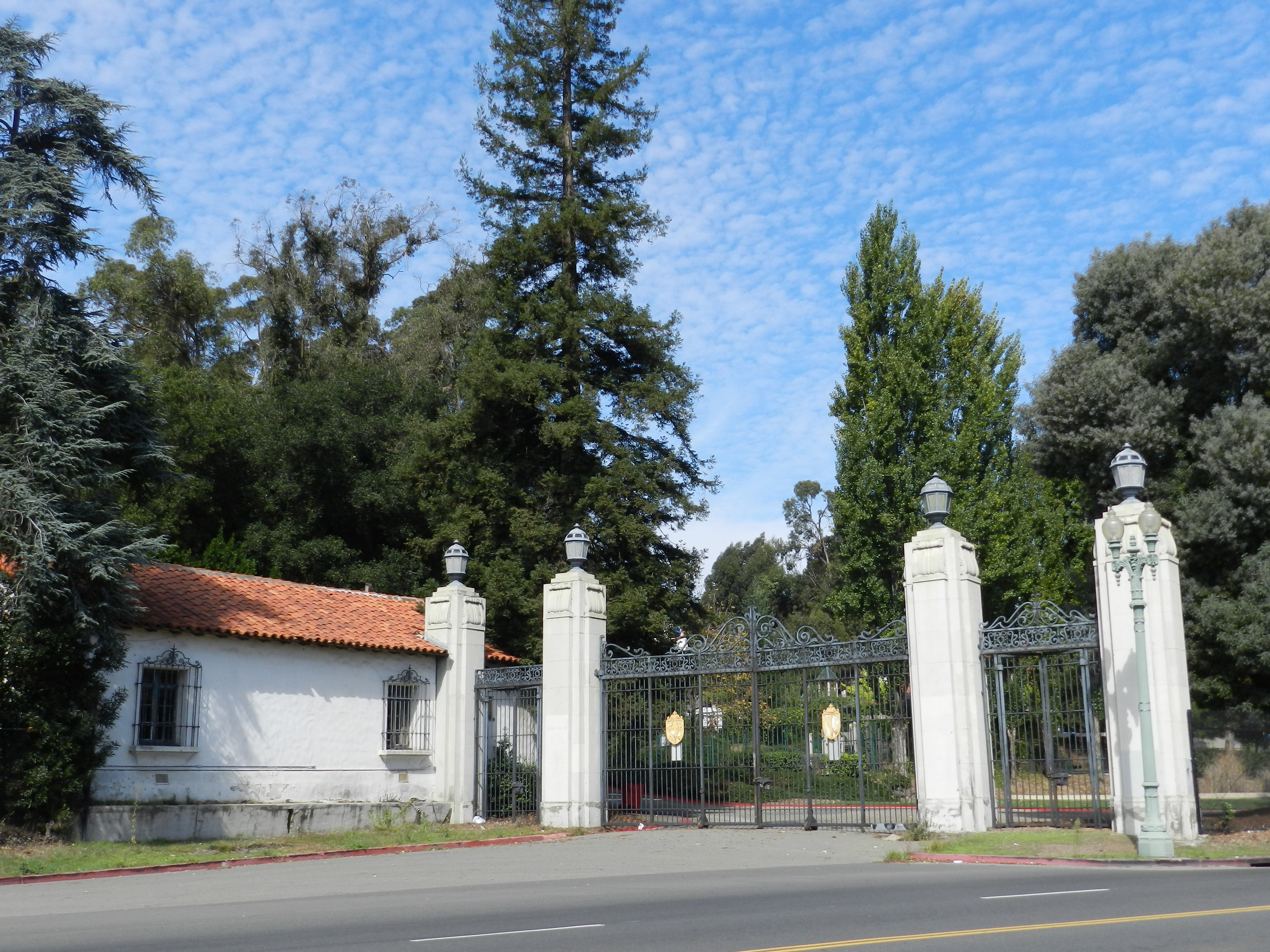
Entrance to Mills College, Seminary Avenue

Seminary is named after Mills College. The main street running through the neighborhood, today's Seminary Avenue, was the main route from the bayshore to the college, which was known at the time as "The Young Ladies' Seminary." More recent proposed names for the area include Heartlands, Baja Maxwell Park, and Lower Millsmont. These proposed changes have been criticized as part of gentrification. The area, especially along Seminary Avenue, is considered to be in the "killing zone" or "kill zone" due to violence.

Rapper Philthy Rich was born and raised in this neighborhood. Also American internet personality and online streamer JayFamous was raised in this neighborhood.
