= Sobrante Park, Oakland, California =

Coordinates: 37°43′57.71″N 122°10′43.66″W

Sobrante Park is a neighborhood located in East Oakland, California, which is partially separated from the rest of the city by two railroad tracks and San Leandro Creek. It was built shortly after World War II, first as a White-Only Lockout and then gradually becoming a White flight red-zone in the mid to late 1950s, and in the early 1960s it became a working-class black neighborhood. It was projected by planners that there would be no in-road into San Leandro's Davis St. residential area which was developed during the same period.

In the 1980s the neighborhood became a center of crack cocaine dealing. A large gang from the neighborhood gave itself the nickname, "11-5" (or "11-500") which refers to the section of California State's legal code for drug crimes. A memorial to 32 men and six women members of the gang who have been killed since then (as of 2002) was painted on the basketball court in Tyrone Carney Park, a local park named after a young man from the neighborhood who died in the Vietnam War. The city installed a fence around the park in an attempt to reduce the murders and drug dealing that had been taking place in and around the park.

Sobrante Park is a mostly African-American and Latino neighborhood, with African-Americans forming 53.5%, and Latinos forming about 38%.

Sobrante Park and the informally named "Ghost Town" have been two of the most crime-ridden areas on Oakland.

Recently, the Alameda County Department of Health, local organizations, and community members established a Time Bank project for the neighborhood in order to facilitate skill sharing among residents, rebuild trust, and revitalize the community of Sobrante Park.
