= Elmhurst, Oakland, California =

Residential neighborhood in Oakland, California

Coordinates: 37°45′07″N 122°10′19″W

Elmhurst is a residential neighborhood in the southernmost part of Oakland, California. Originally a separate unincorporated town, it was annexed by Oakland in 1909, and today is considered part of East Oakland. It lies at an elevation of 39 feet (12 m).

== History ==
Elmhurst began in 1865, when a railroad station was constructed by the San Francisco and Alameda Railroad. Originally named "Jones", the station was renamed "Elmhurst" in 1869. The town's first post office was established in 1892. The town of Elmhurst was primarily an agricultural community. After the 1906 San Francisco earthquake, East Bay communities grew in population, and the City of Oakland annexed several surrounding communities in 1909, including Elmhurst. The neighborhood grew into a manufacturing center in the years that followed, with automobile manufacturing playing a significant role. Chevrolet opened an auto assembly plant in Elmhurst in 1915, called Oakland Assembly which shut down in the 1960s.

Elmhurst was the site of one of the large carbarns for the Key System's streetcars, the Elmhurst Carhouse. The carhouse was located on East 14th (International Blvd.), on the southern half of the block bounded by 94th and 96th avenues and Holly Street. It was closed on June 29, 1932, its operations being consolidated at the Key System's Central Carhouse near Lake Merritt.

== See also ==
- Buzz Arlett
