= Havenscourt, Oakland, California =

Neighborhood of Oakland, California

Coordinates: 37°45′56″N 122°11′14″W

Havenscourt is a neighborhood of Oakland in Alameda County, California.

== Schools ==
Middle school campus located in the Havenscourt neighborhood housing the Coliseum College Prep Academy which was established in 2006 from the breakup of Havenscourt Middle School.
