= Oakland Zoo =

Zoo in Oakland, California, United States

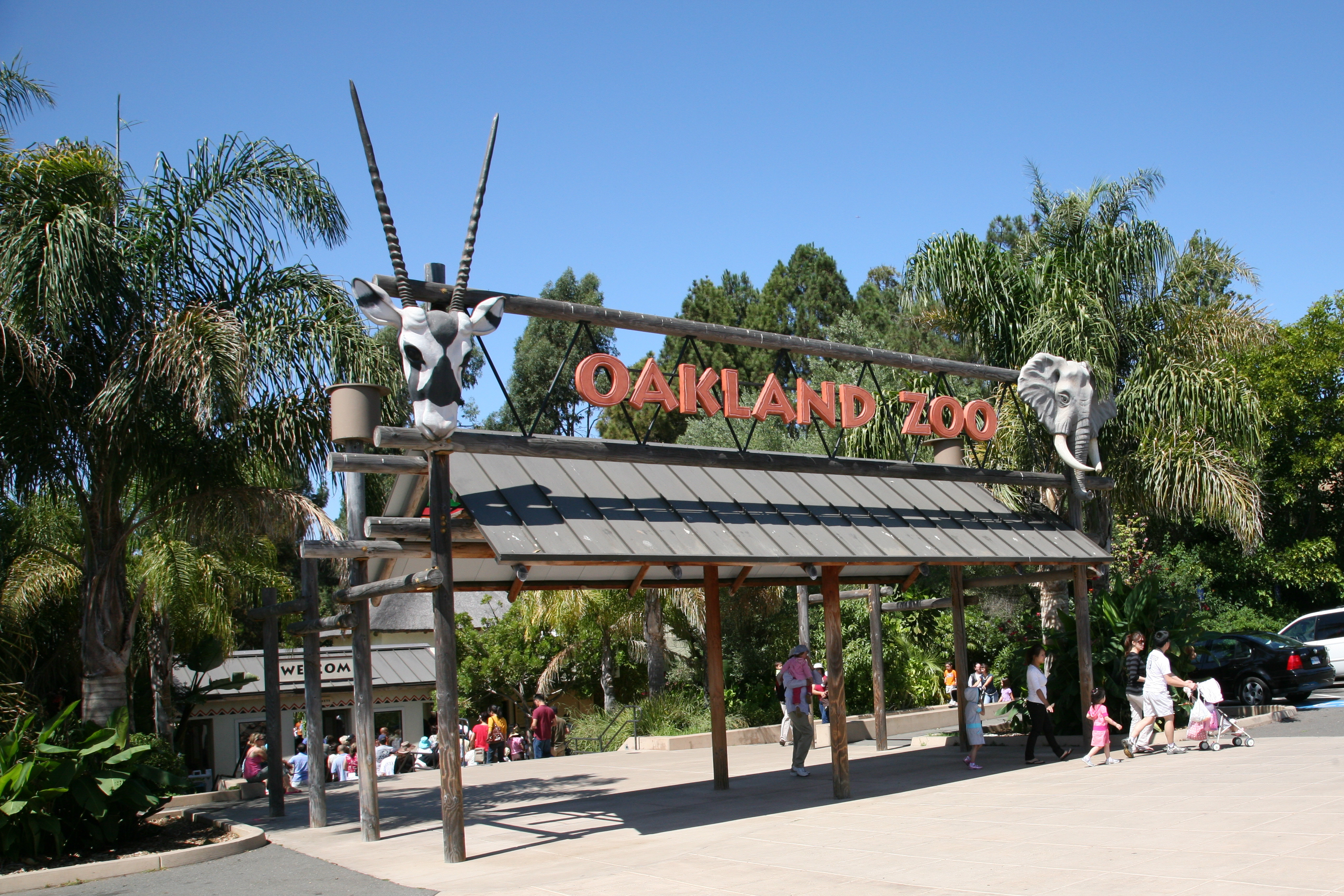
- Main entrance
- Interactive map of Oakland Zoo
- 37.7508°N 122.1477°W
- Date opened: 1922; 104 years ago
- Location: 9777 Golf Links Rd.; Oakland, California 94605
- Land area: 100 acres (40 ha)
- No. of animals: 850+
- Annual visitors: 975,000
- Memberships: AZA
- Public transit: AC Transit: 46
- Website: www.oaklandzoo.org

The Oakland Zoo is located in the Grass Valley neighborhood of Oakland, California, United States. Established on June 6, 1922, it is managed by the Conservation Society of California, a 501(c)(3) non-profit organization dedicated to the conservation of wildlife both locally and globally. The zoo is home to more than 850 native and exotic animals and is a member of the Association of Zoos and Aquariums (AZA).

== History ==
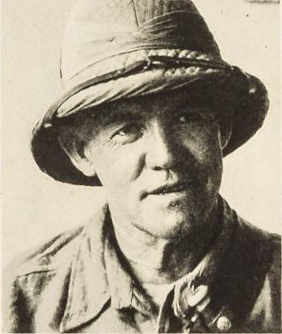
Henry A. Snow, c. 1922

Naturalist Henry A. Snow established the Oakland Zoo on June 6, 1922 - originally at 19th and Harrison streets in downtown Oakland. Snow Park now occupies the site of the zoo's first home.

Over the years the zoo relocated several times: first to Sequoia Park, then Joaquin Miller Park and finally in 1939 to Durant Park. Under Joseph R. Knowland, chairman of the California State Parks Commission, California, purchased the land and in 1950 renamed the park to Joseph Knowland State Arboretum and Park.^{[1]}

In 1936, Henry A. Snow's son, Sidney Snow, established the nonprofit organization East Bay Zoological Society, which was originally known as the Alameda County Botanical and Zoological Society. The East Bay Zoological Society operated and managed the zoo for the City of Oakland from 1982 until August 2017, when it was renamed the Conservation Society of California to better reflect the zoo's evolving purpose and mission in its commitment to conservation. Governed by a volunteer board of trustees, the Conservation Society of California manages and operates Oakland Zoo.

With over 25 wildlife conservation partners globally, the zoo provides funds to support their programs and efforts to save wildlife. Through their partnerships with California Department of Fish and Wildlife, they accept, rehabilitate, and re-home wildlife rescued from wildfire and human-wildlife conflict. This has included 22 mountain lions, 38 California condors, 8 bears, including grizzly bears and American black bears, and over 600 yellow-legged frogs.

== Expansion ==
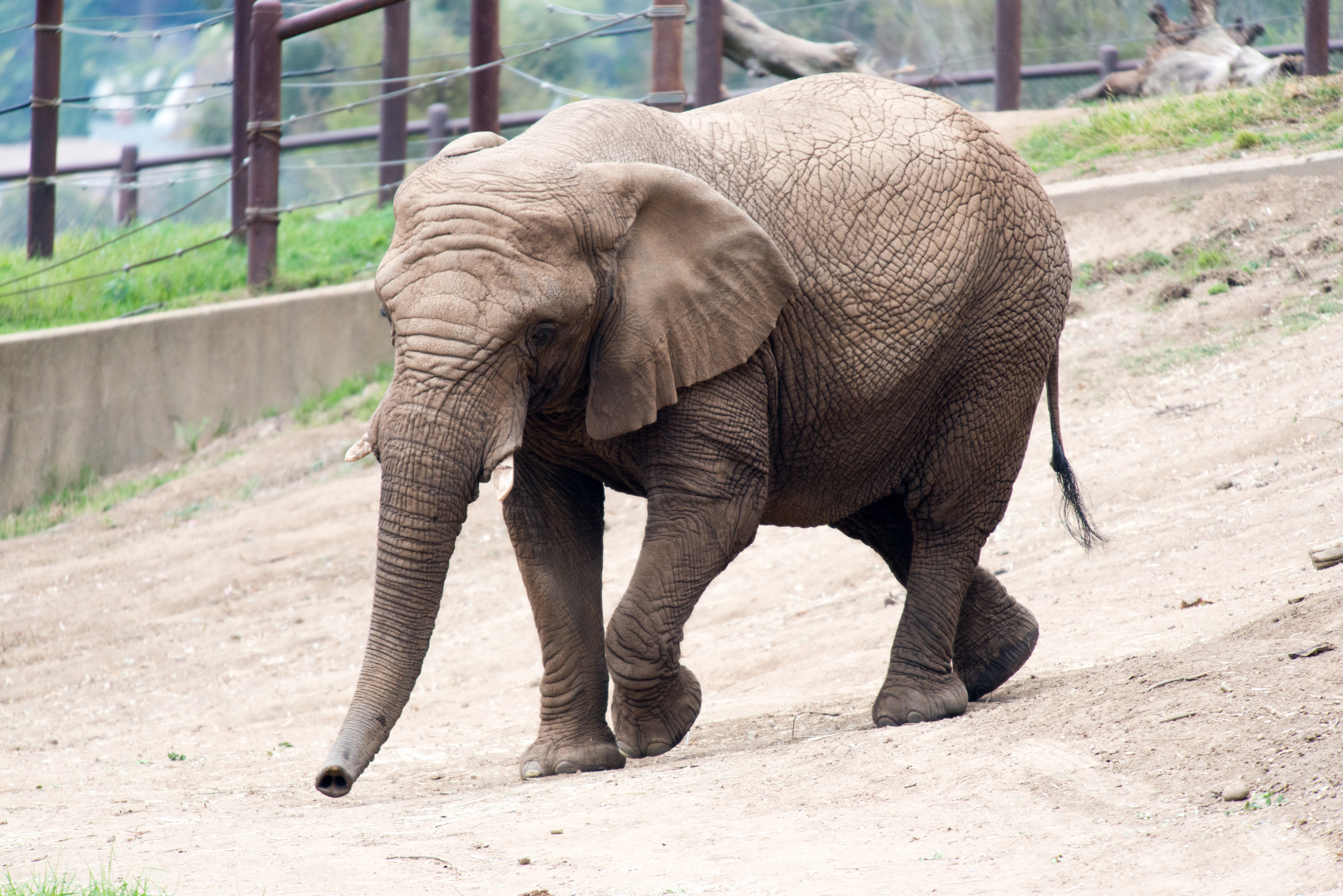
African elephant walking in the elephant exhibit

New exhibits have been created, including those for the hamadryas baboons and the chimpanzees. A spacious elephant exhibit was built in 1987. The sun bear exhibit was finished in 1995 and was featured on Animal Planet Ultimate Zoos. The white-handed gibbons live on a lush island in the heart of the Tropical Rainforest on Gibbon Island. The African Savannah, with camels, lions, elephants, meerkats, hyenas and more, was completed in 1998.

The Education Center opened its doors in 1999 and the main entrance followed soon in summer 2001. In autumn of 2001, a squirrel monkey exhibit opened along with a larger, renovated tiger exhibit. In the spring of 2007, the four dromedary camels were moved to a larger, fenced enclosure uphill from their old enclosure.

Oakland zoo provides free and discounted science education programs for underserved students attending Title 1 schools in the Greater Bay Area. It gives 5,500 vouchers every year to schools and community organizations as part of its Zoo-to Community program. It reaches an average of over 3,000 students and 1,000 adults yearly.

In 2012, a fully funded LEED-certified veterinary hospital opened, followed by the opening in 2013 of the Oakland Zoo Biodiversity Center, and the 2014 inauguration of the Condor Recovery Center at Oakland Zoo. Each of these projects has improved care of the zoo's animals as well as conservation of the species in the wild.

=== California Trail ===
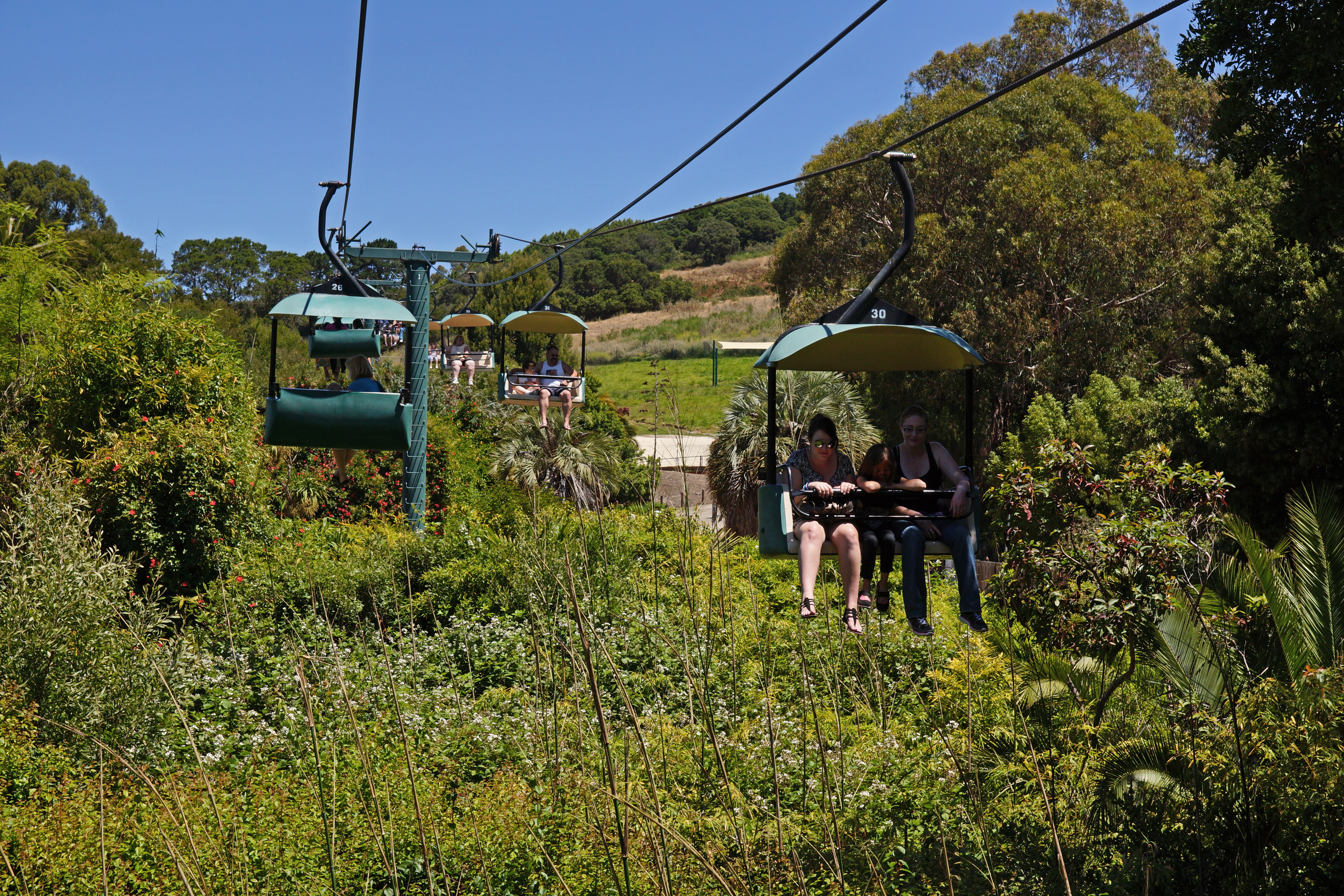
Aerial gondola at the zoo

The California Trail section opened in summer 2018 at the top of the hill above the main zoo, representing $70 million out of an $81 million multi-phase zoo development. Through live native animal and plant habitats, the zoo highlights the delicate balance between humans and nature, and the impact of change on all three.

Guests travel to the trail via an aerial gondola from the existing zoo. Along the trail, they encounter animals such as bears, wolves, mountain lions, bison and birds of prey. The half-acre California Wilds! playground introduces young children and their families to California wildlife and habitats through themed play structures. Inside the Conservation Habitarium - with a wall-length window into the grizzly bear habitat, visitors explore California's diverse habitats, step into the shoes of conservation researchers, and find their place as a member of a community of people taking action for California's wildlife. The project was designed by Noll & Tam Architects and built by C. Overaa & Co.

California Trail is an example of the Oakland Zoo's leadership in captive animal welfare, and its commitment to providing natural and enriched environments to promote species-typical behaviors for captive wildlife. California Trail is a model for other zoological facilities, sending the critical message that zoos have an important role to play in the rescue, rehabilitation, and care of wildlife...Oakland Zoo has long prioritized common sense and welfare, and PETA looks forward to continued collaboration on improving the welfare of captive wildlife across the U.S.

— Brittany Peet, Esq., Director, Captive Animal Law Enforcement PETA Foundation

=== The Wayne and Gladys Valley Children's Zoo ===
In the summer of 2005 the 3-acre (12,000 m^{2}) Valley Children's Zoo opened with spacious new animal exhibits along with plenty of interactive play-structures for children. The lemurs, tortoises, and the interactive Goat and Sheep Contact Yard along with the river otters, American alligators, bats, pigs, rabbits, the Bug Room, and the Reptile and Amphibian Discovery Room are all found in the Children's Zoo. One feature popular with younger children are the brass insects embedded in the concrete walkways, which were installed as a form of public art. The Clorox Wildlife Theater, which is home to many animal shows presenting all kinds of creatures, native and non-native, is also found in the Children's Zoo.

== Animals at Oakland Zoo ==
Flamingo Plaza

- African spoonbill
- Lesser flamingo

Tropical Rainforest

- Blue-and-yellow macaw
- Chimpanzee
- Common squirrel monkey
- Cotton-top tamarin
- Great curassow
- Guira cuckoo
- Hadada ibis
- Lar gibbon
- Military macaw
- Red-rumped agouti
- Siamang
- Southern pudu
- Sun bear
- Tiger

African Savanna

- African lion
- African sacred ibis
- Ball python
- Black-throated monitor
- Blue-bellied roller
- Common warthog
- Dromedary camel
- Egyptian goose
- Fischer's lovebird
- Giant plated lizard
- Grant's zebra
- Hamadryas baboon
- Hamerkop
- Hooded Vulture
- Klipspringer
- Meerkat
- Pancake tortoise
- Pied crow
- Red-bellied parrot
- Red-tailed monkey
- Reticulated giraffe
- Rock hyrax
- Speckled pigeon
- Spotted hyena
- Sudan plated lizard
- Superb starling
- Taveta weaver
- White-faced whistling duck

Wayne and Gladys Valley Children's Zoo

- African spurred tortoise
- Aldabra giant tortoise
- Amazon tree boa
- American alligator
- Asian forest scorpion
- Black beauty stick insect
- Black tree monitor
- Black widow spider
- Blue spiny lizard
- Brown anole
- Caribbean giant cockroach
- Chilean rose tarantula
- Chuckwalla
- Colombian red-tailed boa
- Common carrion beetle
- Crowned lemur
- Desert tortoise
- Domestic rabbit
- Dyeing poison dart frog
- Eastern box turtle
- Florida red-bellied cooter
- Giant African millipede
- Giant vinegaroon
- Gila monster
- Goat
- Golden mantella
- Golfodulcean poison frog
- Green and black poison dart frog
- Green anole
- Green mantella
- Guinea Hog
- Henkel's leaf-tailed gecko
- Island flying fox
- Jungle nymph
- Large flying fox
- Leafcutter ant
- Madagascar hissing cockroach
- Mission golden-eyed tree frog
- North American river otter
- Panamanian golden frog
- Ring-tailed lemur
- Spotted turtle
- Three-toed box turtle
- Yellow-banded poison dart frog

Wild Australia

- Agile wallaby
- Common wallaroo
- Emu

California Trail

- American bison
- American black bear
- Bald eagle
- Brown bear
- California condor
- Gray wolf
- Grizzly bear
- Jaguar
- Mountain lion
- Red-tailed hawk

== Glowfari ==
Glowfari is a light event hosted by the zoo in the winter. It features larger-than-life lantern animals. The path is one mile long and features more than 100 animals and more than 800 additional light displays. There are three worlds: Aquatic, Ecosystem/Food chain, and Jurassic.

== Osh the Elephant ==
On July 9, 2024, Oakland Zoo announced that Osh (male, 30), the last elephant at the zoo, would be moving later that fall to The Elephant Sanctuary in Tennessee. This is the same place their last elephant, Donna, is now living. This decision was made after months of consideration from zoo staff. Elephants are highly social animals and so it was recommended to move him to another facility that could provide for his social needs. They have not announced yet what they are planning to do with the former elephant paddock or if they will receive more elephants, but they did say that no matter what they decide to do, the enclosure will need to be refurbished and will probably go under construction. Osh left Oakland on October 16th, 2024 and arrived, after a nearly 46 hour roadtrip, to Tennessee two days later.

== Gallery ==
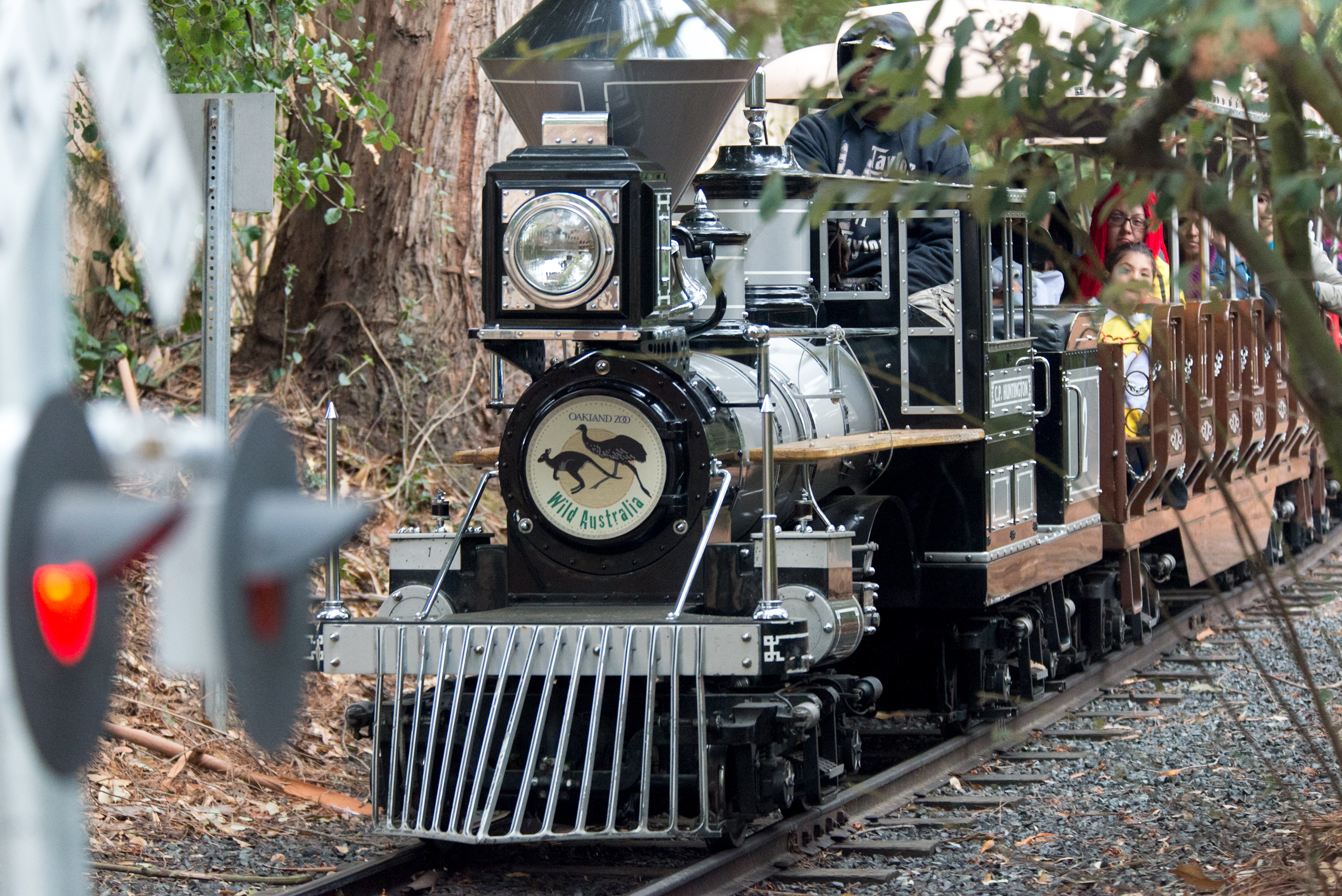
Outback Express Adventure Train

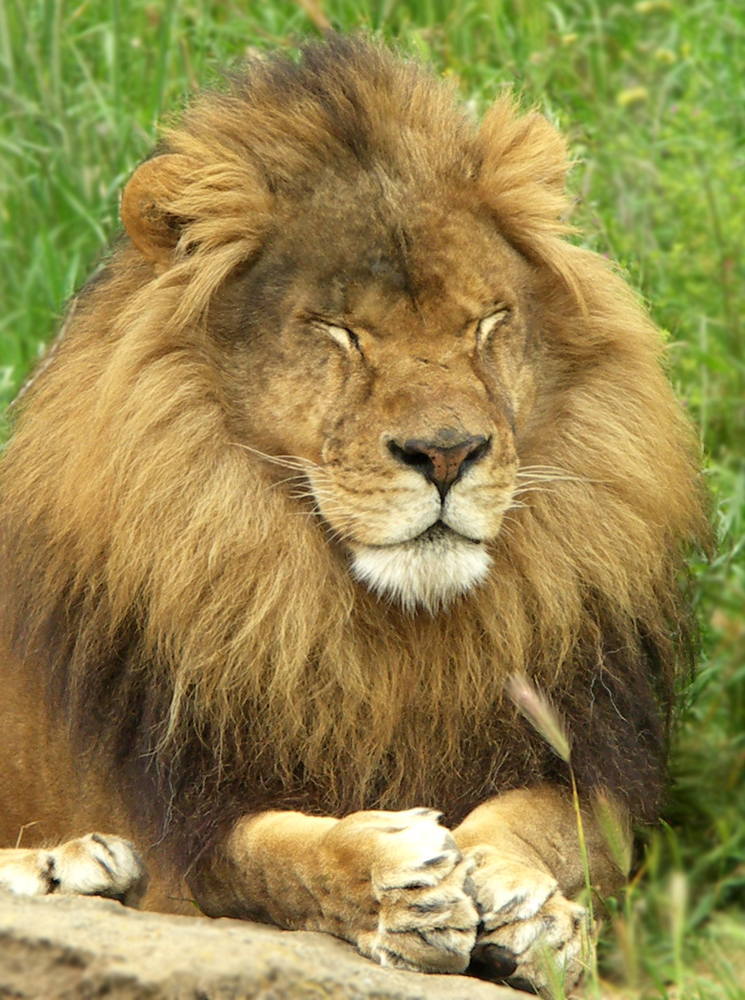
Lion

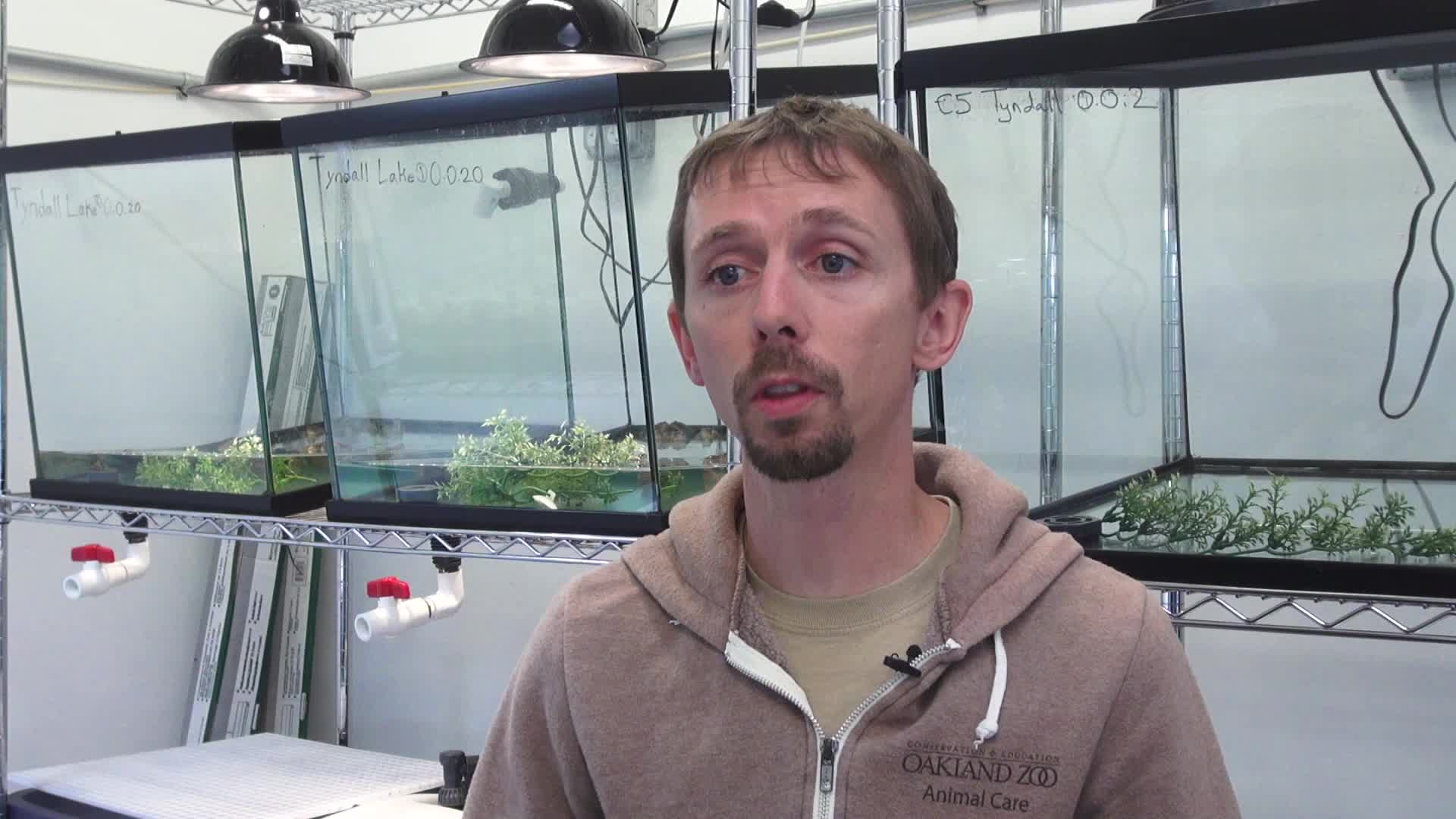
Conservation work at the zoo

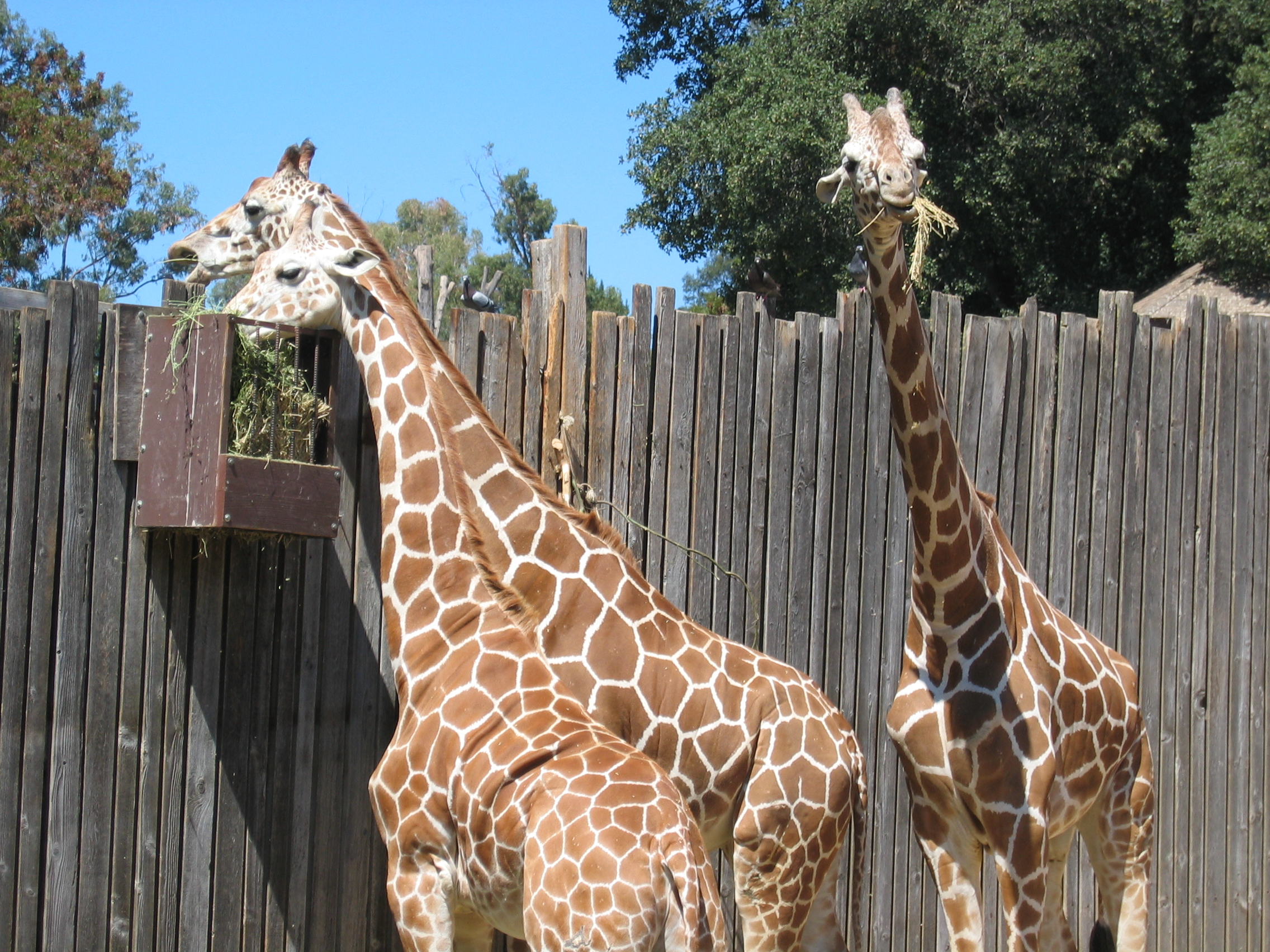
Giraffe exhibit

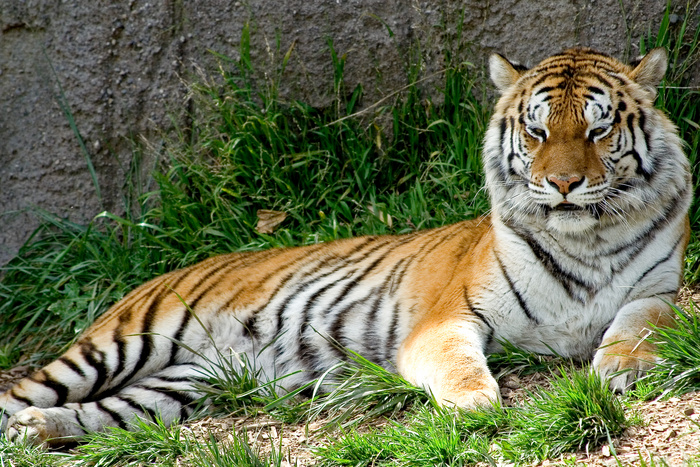
Tiger exhibit

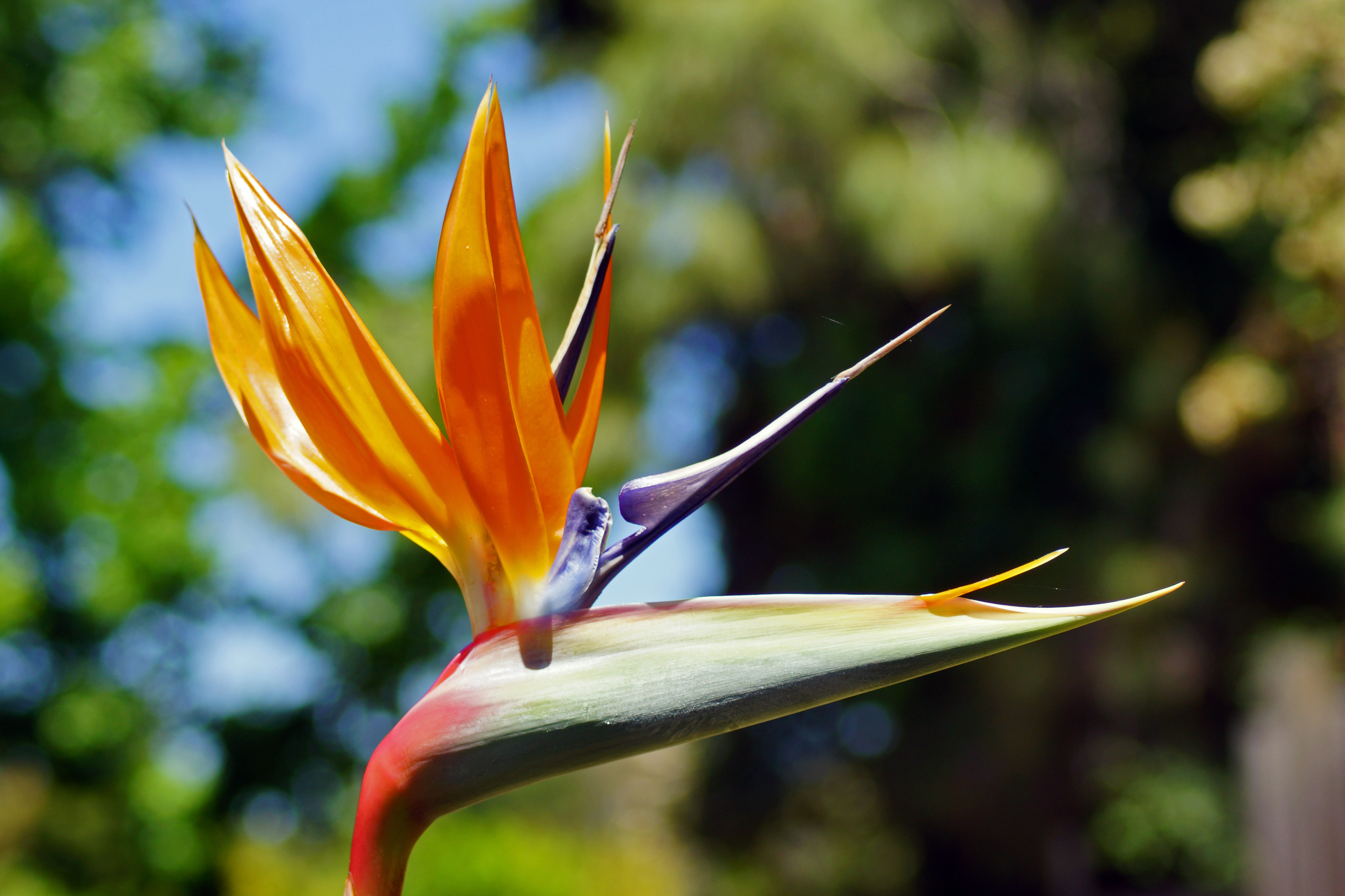
Flowering plants at the zoo

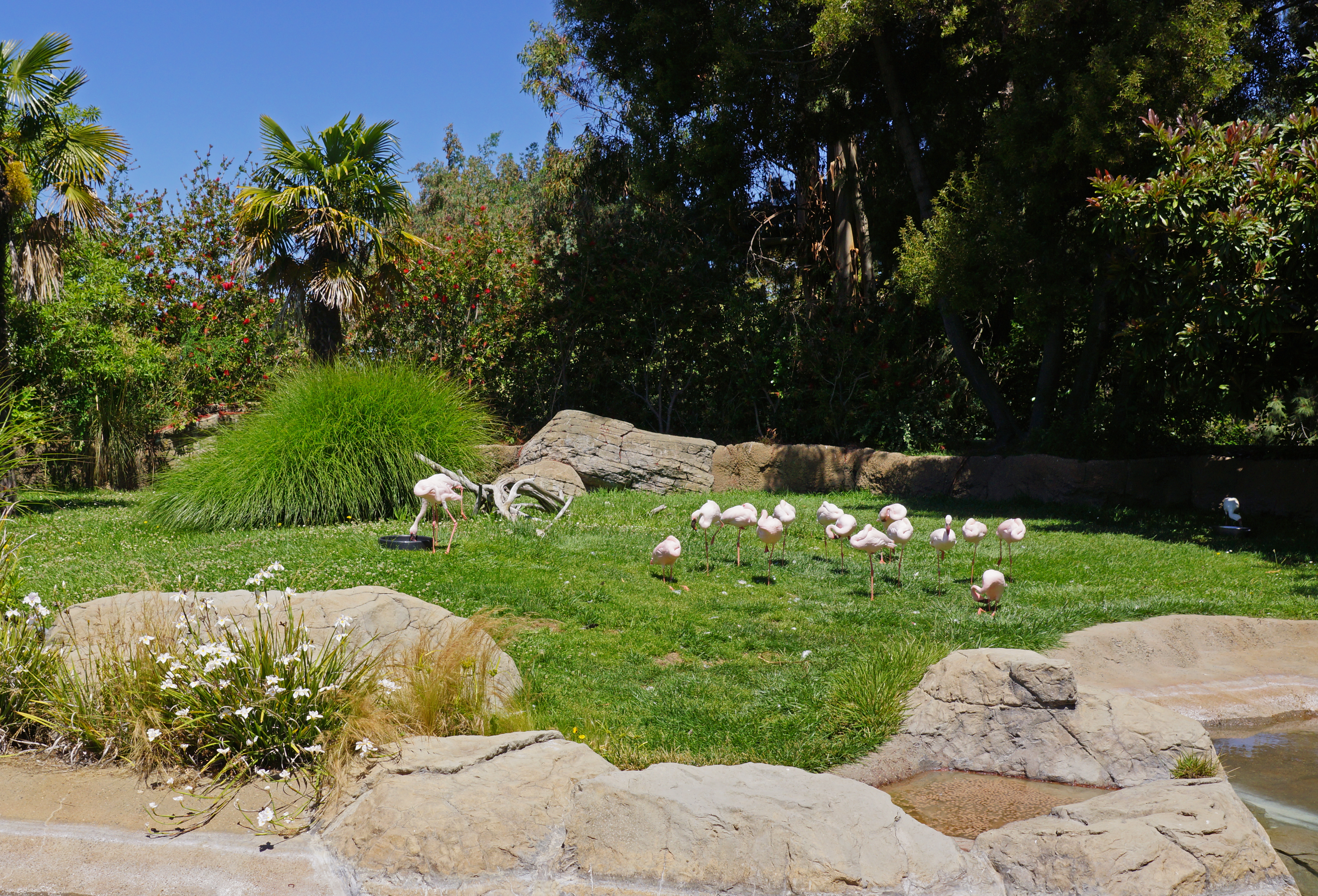
Flamingos at the main entrance

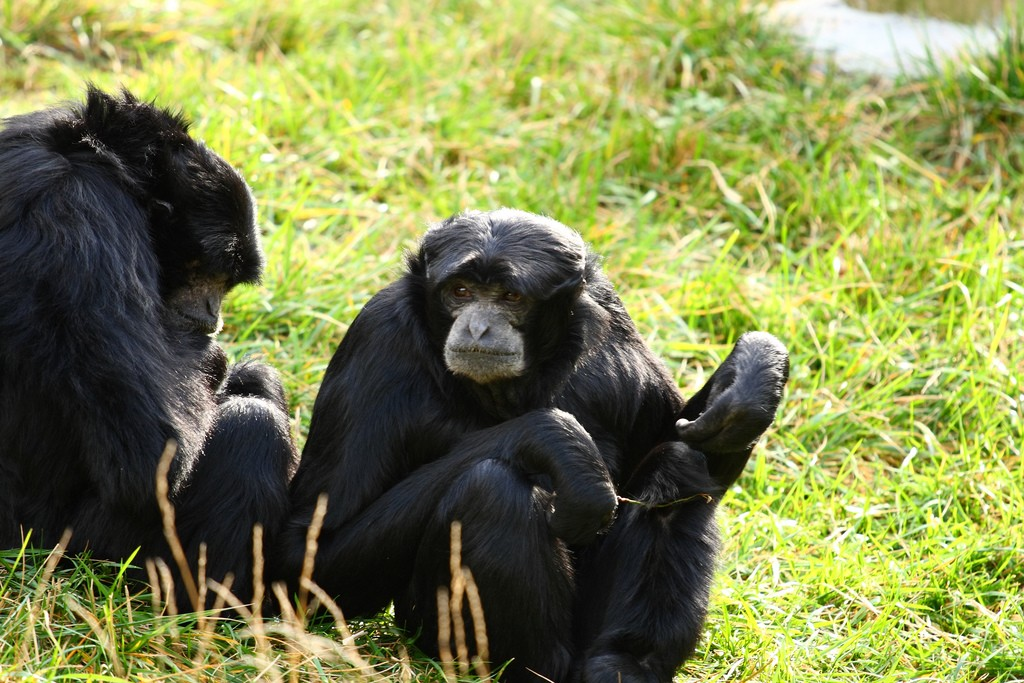
Gibbons at the zoo

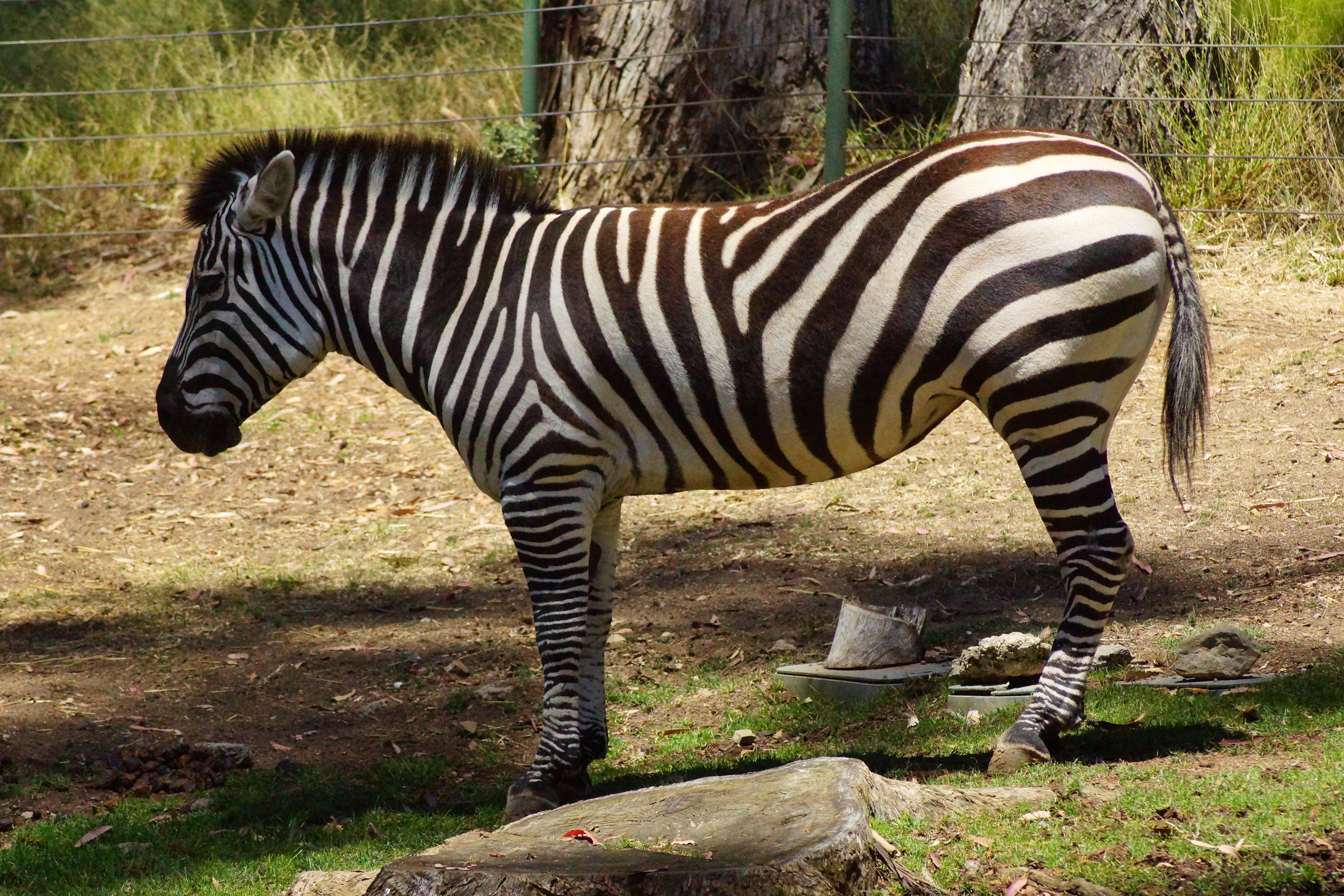
Zebra resting in the shade

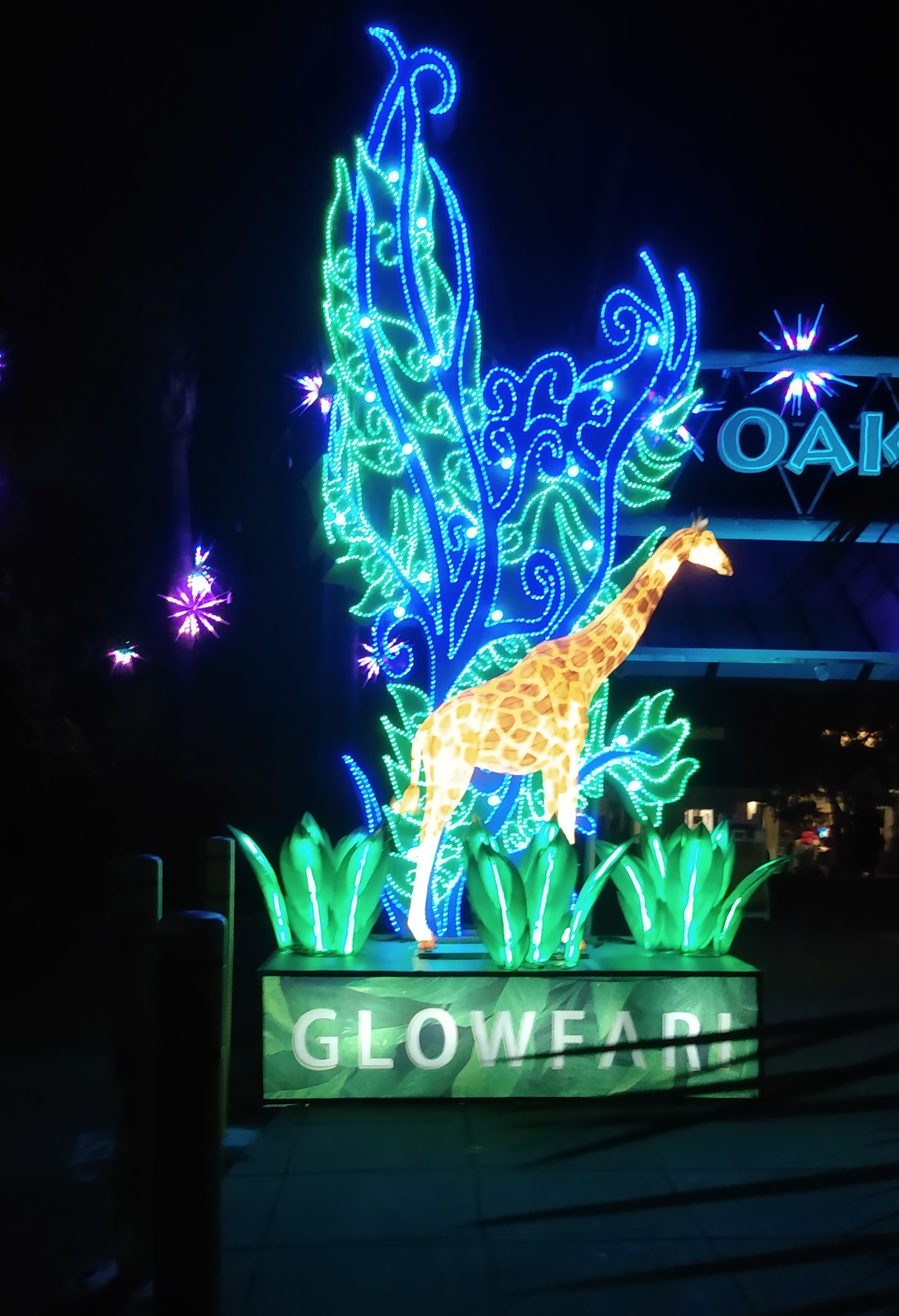
Glowfari
