= Ridgemont, Oakland, California =

Neighborhood in Oakland, California, US

Coordinates: 37°46′55.24″N 122°9′28.23″W

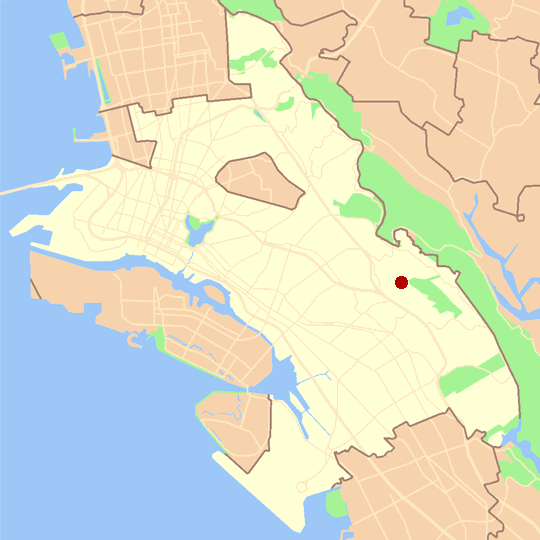
Location of Ridgemont in the City of Oakland.

Ridgemont is a neighborhood in Oakland, California, next to Merritt College along Campus Drive, the main thoroughfare at the ridgeline. First developed in the 1970s and 1980s, the neighborhood (one of the last undeveloped parcels in the city of Oakland at the time) began as a subdivision of large, pre-designed, fairly uniform, redwood suburban-style homes. As the Ridgemont subdivision grew, new construction brought to it large estates, both subdivision planned and individual architect-designed. These, the largest homes of the neighborhood, were placed on the neighborhood crest and nearby highest points of the hillsides to take advantage of three-bridge views of the Bay. A newer subdivision,"Monte Vista Homes," on the lower slopes below the Ridgemont subdivision, commenced in 2005 as Desilva, a real estate developer, began building on slopes of the defunct Leona quarry (also known as the Alma pyrite mine). In preparation for the new subdivision, the development team subcontracted land restoration teams so that the former quarry underwent extensive land recovery ––including the replanting of fire-resistant, native plants for soil retention and beautification––prior to homes construction. But the quarry's outlines – the massive carving out of the hillside over decades – is still visible from as far away as San Francisco.

A wildfire consumed about twenty acres in the district on September 26, 2017, directly threatening numerous ridgeline estates, before Oakland Fire Department crews, aided by an air tanker and helicopters which drew water from nearby San Leandro Reservoir, quickly extinguished the blaze. No structures were burned.
