= Grass Valley, Oakland, California =

Neighborhood in Oakland, California, USA

Coordinates: 37°45′8.37″N 122°9′2.89″W

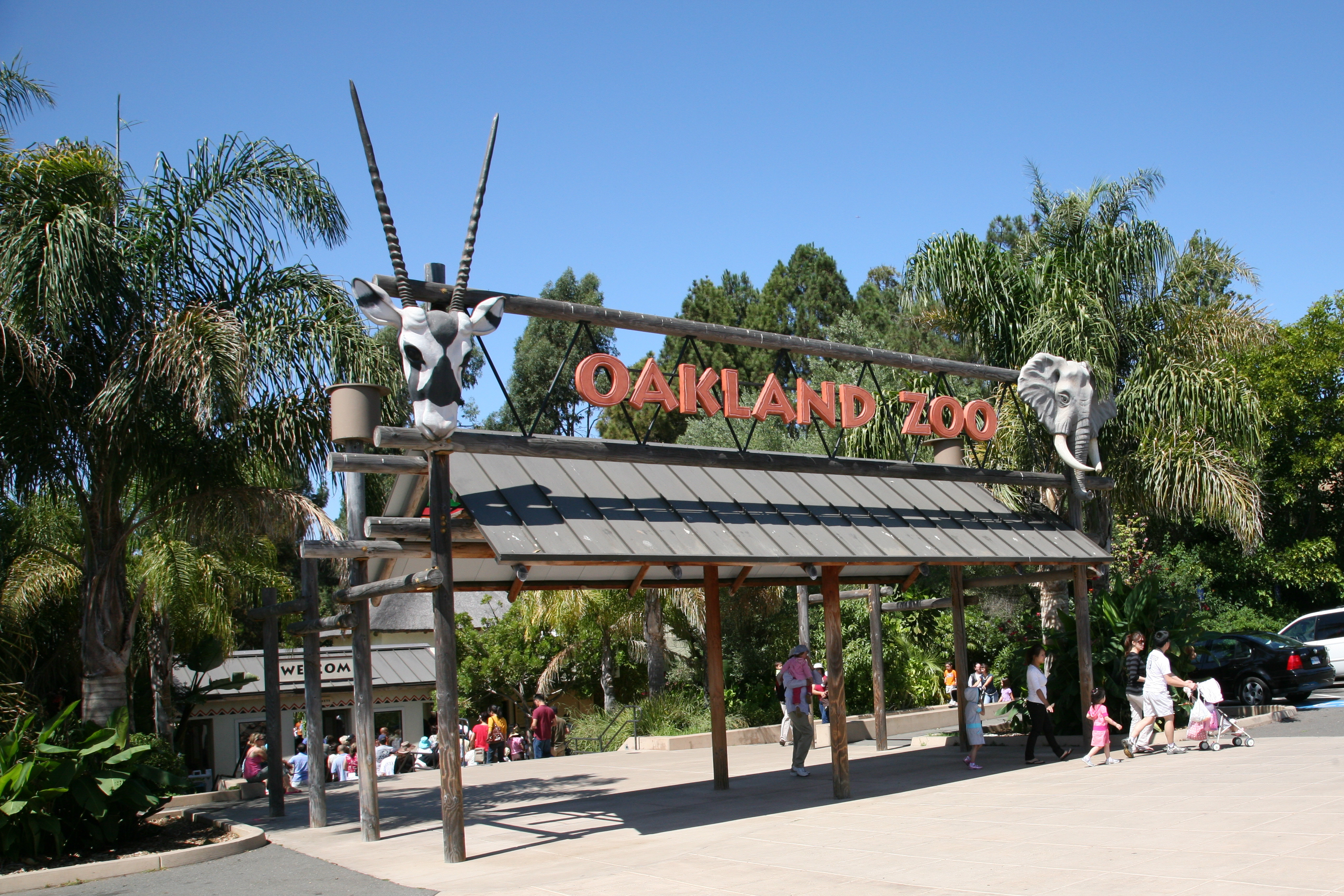
Oakland Zoo main entrance

Grass Valley is a neighborhood in Oakland, California. Located in East Oakland in the hills east of Bishop O'Dowd High School and the Oakland Zoo. It straddles upper Golf Links Road and lies just west of Skyline Boulevard's end. It is adjacent to the Lake Chabot Golf Course. It is home to Grass Valley Elementary School, which was opened in 1953.
