= Jean Quan =

American politician (born 1949)

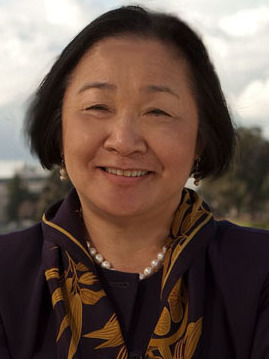
- 2010 campaign portrait

49th Mayor of Oakland
- In office January 3, 2011 – January 5, 2015
- Preceded by: Ron Dellums
- Succeeded by: Libby Schaaf

Member of the Oakland City Council District 4
- In office January 2003 – January 2011
- Preceded by: Dick Spees
- Succeeded by: Libby Schaaf

Member of the Oakland School Board
- In office 1991–2003

Personal details
- Born: Lai Jean Quan; October 21, 1949 (age 77) Livermore, California, U.S.
- Party: Democratic
- Spouse: Floyd Huen
- Children: 2
- Website: Quan for Oakland

Chinese name
- Traditional Chinese: 關麗珍
- Simplified Chinese: 关丽珍
Transcriptions
Standard Mandarin
- Hanyu Pinyin: Guān Lì Zhēn
Yue: Cantonese
- Jyutping: Gwaan1 Lai6 Zan1

Lai Jean Quan (born October 21, 1949) is an American politician who served the 49th mayor of Oakland, California from 2011 to 2015. She previously served as City Council member for Oakland's 4th District. Upon inauguration on January 3, 2011, she became Oakland's first female mayor. Quan ran an unsuccessful campaign for reelection in 2014, losing the mayoral race to Libby Schaaf, a member of the Oakland City Council.

== Personal life ==
Quan was born in Livermore, California. Her family ties in the Bay Area date back to the 1870s, when her great-grandfather immigrated to San Francisco from Kaiping, Sze Yup (a region of Guangdong province). Quan's husband, Dr. Floyd Huen, is a doctor of internal medicine for Alameda County.

== Oakland School Board and City Council ==
Quan was on the Oakland School Board for 12 years, starting in 1990 after organizing a citywide parent organization, Save Our Schools. As a parent leader she helped save the music program in the Oakland Schools. She served as chair of the California Urban Schools Association, the Asian Pacific Islanders School Board Members Association (APISBMA), and the Council of Urban Boards Association (the urban caucus of the National School Board Association representing the nation's 100 largest districts). She was appointed by the Clinton Administration to represent School Boards on the Title I Rules Making Committee. In these roles she advocated for more funding for urban and immigrant students, more inclusion of minority community history in textbooks, comprehensive school services and after school programs, and expansion of pre-school and adult education programs.

In 1996 with Quan as president, the school board instituted a program using Standard English Program strategies to teach standard English to African American students. The move created national news with the perception Oakland schools were teaching students "Ebonics" because there was discussion about Ebonics being used as a teaching tool.

Quan and Congresswoman Barbara Lee in 2002

Quan (seated, furthest left) with other City Council members and Mayor Jerry Brown, circa 2004

In 2002, Quan was elected to her first term as Council Member for Oakland District 4 (Allendale, Brookdale, Crestmont, Dimond, Laurel, Maxwell Park, Melrose, Montclair, and Redwood Heights).

In July 2010, Quan along with fellow City Council member and mayoral candidate Rebecca Kaplan were investigated by Oakland police for their actions during a protest following the manslaughter verdict of former BART Police officer Johannes Mehserle. Police claimed Quan and Kaplan joined a "human chain" which prevented officers from clearing a street, while the two countered they were acting as "peacekeepers". No charges were filed against the Councilwomen. Quan was the victim of a street robbery in September of the same year, in front of the Dimond neighborhood Safeway supermarket. Quan attributed the crime to lack of employment opportunities in Oakland.

== Mayor of Oakland ==
=== 2010 election ===
In Oakland's 2010 election, was Quan the winner with 53,897 votes from 105,769 valid votes (50.96% of the valid votes).

=== Initiatives ===
Within her first six months in office, Quan met with more than 3,000 residents in eight town hall meetings. The resulting priorities reportedly developed by residents at these sessions were to help focus the city's and community's agenda. Her election as Oakland's first female mayor, and the first Chinese-American female mayor of a major U.S. city, resulted in high visibility nationally and internationally. Quan capitalized on this visibility by traveling to and meeting with potential trade and business partners for the City and Port of Oakland.

=== Criticism and praise ===
During the second week of Quan's tenure in January 2011, it was discovered Oakland Police chief Anthony Batts was a top-two candidate for the open position of San Jose Police chief. Two weeks later, Quan introduced a plan for the police department which included updating the technological staff and rehiring 10 of the 80 officers who were laid off the previous year. Batts announced his intention to remain in Oakland a few days later, but eventually resigned in October of the same year.

A KPIX/CBS5 poll taken just before Quan's first 100 days revealed that her job performance "garners the approval of the city's residents by a 2–1 margin." The Capitol Weekly named Mayor Quan one of the top ten "Good" Mayors in the state. A KPIX poll six months later, taken shortly after the resignation of Chief Batts, listed an approval rating of 28 percent, with 69 percent responding with "little or no confidence" the mayor's ability to reduce the city's crime problem.

Quan remained unpopular in the city of Oakland. A 2013 SurveyUSA poll found 60 percent of residents disapproved of her job performance and 65 percent said the city was on the wrong track, with crime the voters' primary concern. The Asian-American community gave her the lowest marks, with 67 percent disapproving of her performance.

==== 2011 Occupy Oakland protest ====
Quan received widespread national criticism in October 2011 for her handling of the Occupy Oakland protest. On October 11, Quan visited the protest site. Thirteen days later more than 500 police officers from Oakland, other area police departments, and the State of California were directed to use tear gas and batons to clear the plaza where the protests were being held. Quan was in Washington, D.C. at the time on city business. Quan issued a statement the next morning commending the police chief "for a generally peaceful resolution to a situation". That night, hundreds of police used tear gas, rubber bullets, and flashbang grenades to subdue and arrest over 100 protesters, though denied the use of rubber bullets and flashbang grenades during the press release. The mayor's office was flooded with demands that protesters be released and her legal adviser opposed the police action and threatened to resign.

By November 14, two of Quan's top advisors, legal advisor Dan Siegel and Deputy Mayor Sharon Cornu, had resigned.

Quan was criticized for apparent insensitivity at an Oakland City Council meeting on March 6, 2013. In a conversation with war veteran Scott Olsen, she accused him of having a "chip on his shoulder". Later, Olsen tweeted, "J. Quan told me she realizes I have a chip on my shoulder. Insulting, more like a broken skull and brain trauma."

==== Recall petition ====
On December 7, 2011, the Oakland City Clerk's office approved the request by the Committee to Recall Jean Quan to begin collecting signatures to qualify a recall measure for a future ballot. The committee failed to collect enough signatures to qualify for a measure on the November 2012 ballot.

=== 2014 election ===
Quan ran for reelection in 2014 but lost. Schaaf was sworn in on January 5, 2015.

Political offices
Preceded by Ron Dellums	Mayor of Oakland, California; 2011–2015	Succeeded by Libby Schaaf
