= Dan Siegel (attorney) =

American lawyer (1945–2025)

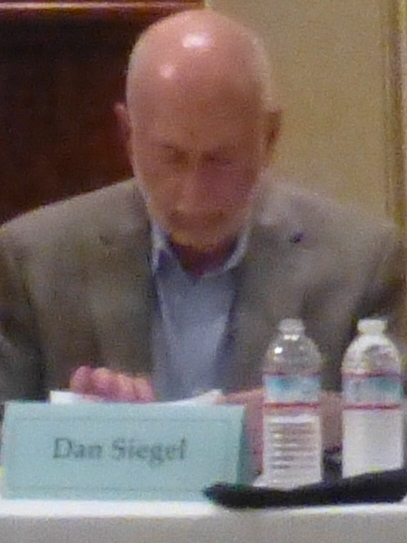
Siegel in 2014

Daniel Mark Siegel (July 20, 1945 – July 2, 2025) was an American civil rights attorney at the Oakland-based law firm Siegel, Yee, Brunner & Mehta, specializing in employment and labor law. Siegel was a legal adviser to Oakland Mayor Jean Quan, and was a candidate in the 2014 Oakland mayoral race. He also served in various capacities for the Pacifica Radio Foundation, including its San Francisco Bay Area station, KPFA-FM in Berkeley.

== Early life and education ==
Siegel was born into a Jewish family in New York City on July 20, 1945, and was raised there and on Long Island. He attended high school in New York, graduating second in his class. He then attended Hamilton College, graduating magna cum laude in 1967 with a bachelor's degree in philosophy and religion.

=== Law school ===
Siegel graduated from UC Berkeley's Boalt Hall in 1970.

==== Student activism ====
Siegel was a student activist in 1967–1970 while he attended UC Berkeley's University of California, Berkeley, School of Law. He was also a leader in the local Students for a Democratic Society. As UC Berkeley Student President-Elect in 1969, Siegel was known for his role in the student rebellion on "Bloody Thursday," when thousands of students clashed with hundreds of California Highway Patrol officers and Alameda County sheriff's deputies sent by the office of then-California governor Ronald Reagan to assert control over a piece of property known as "People's Park." The 2.8 acres (1.13 ha) People's Park was, in 1969, in the midst of a stalled redevelopment plan, littered with debris and abandoned cars. During a rally on Sproul Plaza on that day, May 15, 1969, Siegel received the microphone as the crowd of 3,000 agitated to reclaim what was perceived as their community space, when he yelled "Take the park!" His exhortation was perceived as the start of a riot, which featured protestors marching against riot police, who responded with shotgun fire among other acts, killing one and blinding another.

==== State Bar of California controversy ====
Upon receiving his J.D. degree from the University of California School of Law in 1970 and passing the California bar examination, Siegel was denied a license to practice law by a subcommittee of the State Bar of California. According to the Long Beach Independent, his admittance to the bar was denied on moral grounds because he allegedly "advocated violence and the seizure of property and lied when he denied advocating those things". Earlier in the year, he had been charged with inciting a riot, but had charges dismissed due to a lack of evidence. Siegel and his lawyer Malcolm Burnstein appealed the subcommittee's decision, taking his appeal to the California Supreme Court, which overruled the State Bar and found that Siegel possessed the requisite "moral character" to practice law.

== Professional career ==
=== Siegel, Yee, Brunner & Mehta ===
Siegel was a civil rights attorney at the Oakland-based law firm Siegel, Yee, Brunner & Mehta. In later years, he won a series of high-profile sexual harassment and employment discrimination lawsuits, and represented clients such as the National Union of Healthcare Workers. He served as both general counsel and Interim Executive Director of the Pacifica Radio Foundation and served as a director on both the Pacifica National Board and the Local Station Board of KPFA-FM in Berkeley. In 2006, he completed an eight-year tenure on the Oakland Unified School District Board of Directors.

=== City of Oakland ===
Siegel, a long-time friend of Oakland Mayor Jean Quan, served as her Legal Adviser until November 14, 2011, when he resigned in protest of her decision to clear protestors associated with Occupy Wall Street from their camp at Frank H. Ogawa Plaza. Siegel subsequently announced, via Twitter: "No longer Mayor Quan's legal advisor. Resigned at 2 am. Support Occupy Oakland, not the 1% and its government facilitators."

In 2011, Matthai Kurivila of San Francisco Chronicle described Siegel as "one of Oakland's most active and vocal police critics".

On January 9, 2014, Siegel announced his candidacy for mayor of Oakland. Siegel was not elected, and Libby Schaaf was sworn in on January 5, 2015.

== Personal life and death ==
Siegel and his wife, Anne Butterfield Weills, lived in Oakland beginning in 1977. Weills is an attorney who is listed "of counsel" at Siegel, Yee, Brunner & Mehta. Their son, Michael, was also previously an associate at Siegel & Yee. From 2025 on, Michael served on the Austin City Council, representing District 7. Siegel died from cancer at the Kaiser Hospital in Oakland, on July 2, 2025, at the age of 79.
