= Glenview, Oakland, California =

Glenview
- Neighborhood of Oakland
- View of the commercial corridor in Glenview

- Location within Oakland, California
- Coordinates: 37°48′22.0566″N 122°13′17.3742″W
- Country: United States
- State: California
- County: Alameda
- City: Oakland

Government
  - Councilman: Janani Ramachandran
  - Supervisor: Nikki Fortunato Bas

Area
  - Total: 0.66 sq mi (1.7 km^{2})
  - Land: 0.66 sq mi (1.7 km^{2})
  - Water: 0 sq mi (0 km^{2}) 0%
- Elevation: 272 ft (83 m)

Population (1 April 2010)
  - Total: 5,599
  - Density: 8,500/sq mi (3,300/km^{2})
- ZIP code: 94602

Glenview is a neighborhood in Oakland, California that developed in the early decades of the 20th century, mostly with mid-sized 2 and 3-bedroom craftsman bungalows. The neighborhood lies in the Oakland foothills, bordering Dimond Park on the eastern side of the district, and Park Boulevard on the northwestern side. The upper portion of the neighborhood sits on the west side of Park Boulevard and is bordered by the Trestle Glen neighborhood as well as the City of Piedmont. Park Boulevard, as the neighborhood spine, also serves as the local shopping node, with a number of convenience shops and several restaurants stretching a few blocks. To the south, the neighborhood is delimited by MacArthur Blvd and the I-580 freeway.

The compact street grid along with a good number of amenities in the vicinity (a park, grocery stores, a library, and a number of restaurants) makes the neighborhood highly walkable, with the site walkscore.com rating it "Very Walkable: Most errands can be accomplished on foot.". Per VisitOakland, "Glenview feels more like a very quiet Rockridge with a couple of good restaurants and well-manicured gardens. For trips further afield, AC Transit offers local and transbay bus service mainly from Park Boulevard and MacArthur Boulevard.

The neighborhood school, Glenview Elementary School, built 1927, was found to be seismically inferior by the State Architect and was demolished in 2017, except for the historic art deco facade. The school underwent a major rebuild which was completed by October 2020.

== Demographics ==
Per the 2010 Census, there were 2,576 households in the neighborhood. Of these, 1,074 rented their unit, and 1,502 owned it. The neighborhood overall contained 5,599 residents of which 3,106 were female and 2,493 male. Relative to Oakland as a whole, there were fewer teenagers and young adults, while members of the baby boomer generation born from the mid-1940s and 20 years hence were heavily represented (as of 2010). With a size of 0.66 square miles (1.7 km^{2}), Glenview has a population density of 8,500 persons per square mile, slightly higher than the citywide average of 7,500.

The neighborhood is more affluent than Oakland as a whole, with a median household income of $84,375 (versus $57,778 for Oakland) per 2016 data. Yet, an until recently relatively affordable neighborhood with many good family starter homes and ease of commuting to San Francisco, the neighborhood, along with large swaths of the East Bay, has seen its prices increase rapidly, to the point where Redfin, the real estate broker site, featured the area on a national list of "10 Hottest Neighborhoods to Close out the Year [2017]."

== History ==
The neighborhood was subdivided around 1910 by the developer Wickham Havens Inc (in which Walter Leimert, builder of Leimert Bridge was an executive), and initially referred to as Fourth Avenue Terrace (east of Park Blvd) and Fourth Avenue Terrace Extension (west of Park Blvd). In the early subdivision maps, which doubled as marketing materials, the company attempted to entice would-be-owners with the prospects of good access to the city ("residence sites so close to the heart of Oakland that they should be classed as City, NOT suburban--It is but fifteen minutes from the center of Oakland by car line"). Not only could buyers get to the city via Park Blvd lines, but the early maps shows a second wider right-of-way for Key System streetcar route extension running between Wellington St and Hampel St. While this must have been part of the attraction for early buyers, this extension was never realized.

The district was largely built out by the mid 1930s. Seven out of 10 units in existence today were built before 1939. By the mid-1930s, in a report on creditworthiness of the neighborhood written for the Federal Government's Home Owners' Loan Corporation program which would later earn notoriety for fostering the practice known as red-lining or denying home loans to African American neighborhoods, local officials described the neighborhood approvingly as a "[h]omogeneous district of semi-modern and modern homes and cottages. Convenient to local transportation, excellent schools, and shopping district, in demand by better class people of moderate income."

== See also ==
- Dimond District, Oakland, California
