= 2010 Oakland mayoral election =

- November 2, 2010
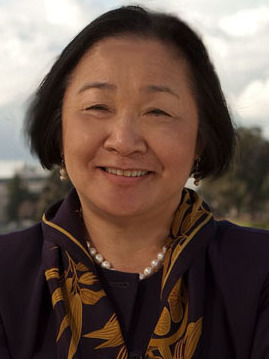

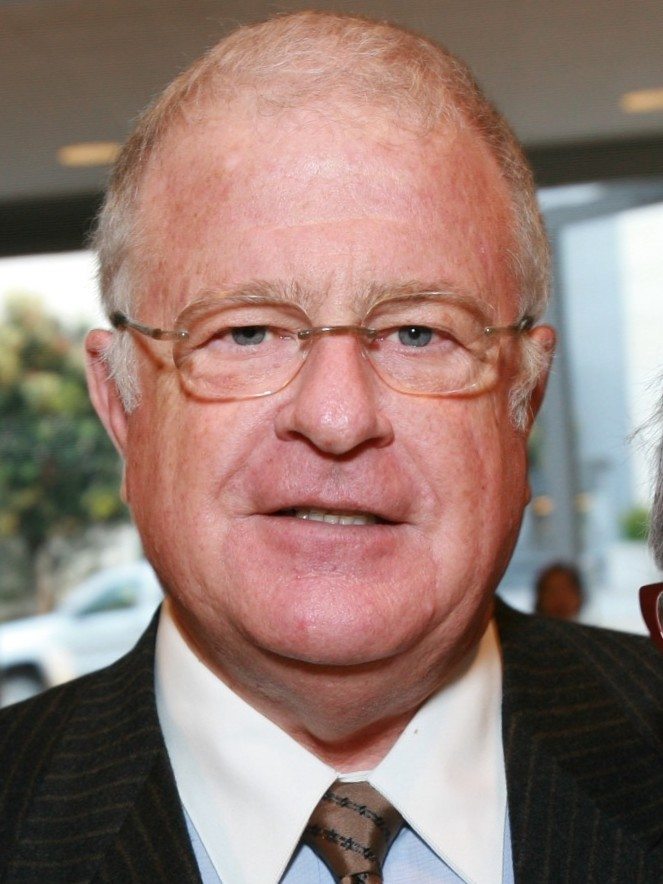

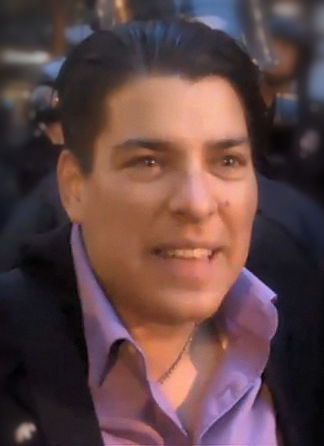

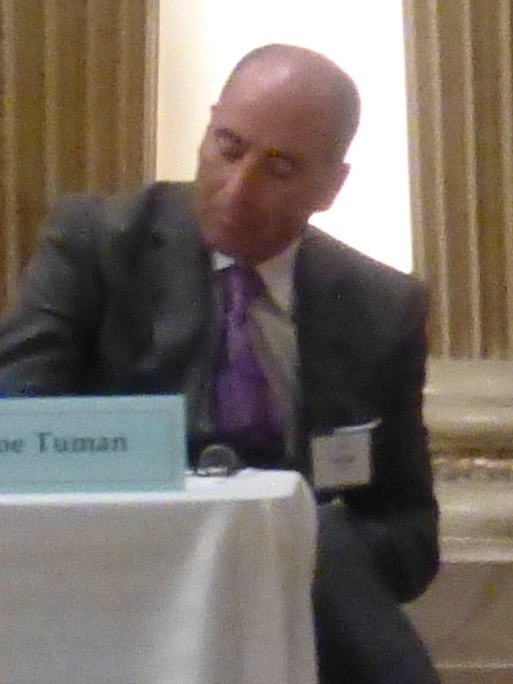
Candidate	Jean Quan	Don Perata
First round vote	29,266	40,342
First round percentage	24.47%	33.73%
Final round vote	53,897	51,872
Final round percentage	50.96%	49.04%
Candidate	Rebecca Kaplan	Joe Tuman
First round vote	15,808	14,347
First round percentage	15.52%	12.00%
Final round vote	Eliminated	Eliminated
Final round percentage	Eliminated	Eliminated
Mayor before election
Ron Dellums
Democratic
Elected mayor
Jean Quan

The 2010 Oakland mayoral election was held on November 2, 2010, to elect the mayor of Oakland, California, electing Jean Quan to be their mayor. In early August 2010 (prior to the first election using "instant-runoff" voting), incumbent mayor Ron Dellums announced that he would not be seeking reelection to a second term. In November 2010, Oakland also (for the first time) instant-runoff voting to elect its mayor, three city council races and four other local offices, with the elections for the mayor and Oakland council district four requiring multiple rounds of counting. Oakland used instant-runoff voting in the city's remaining elected offices in 2012. IRV was again used in 2014 and 2016, including in the 2014 mayoral election in which incumbent Jean Quan was defeated by Libby Schaaf.

Municipal elections in California are officially non-partisan.

== Background ==
- The city of Oakland had passed a measure in November 2006 to adopt instant-runoff voting for 18 city offices, with 69% of those counted in favor of the measure.
- This 2010 election was the first that Oakland held using instant-runoff voting.
- In early August 2010, incumbent mayor Ron Dellums announced that he would not be seeking reelection to a second term.
- This election resulted in the election of Jean Quan.

== Candidates ==
- Terence Candell, founder and head of Candell's College Preparatory Academy
- Arnold Fields, real estate broker and small business owner
- Greg Harland, businessman
- Marcie Hodge, member of Peralta Community College Board of Trustees since 2004, candidate for Oakland City Council in 2006
- Rebecca Kaplan, at-large member of the Oakland City Council since 2009, former at-large member of AC Transit Board (2002–2009)
- Don MacLeay, metal cutter (Green Party)
- Don Perata, former 9th district California State Senate member (1998–2008), former President pro tempore of the California State Senate (2004–2008), former 6th district member of the California State Assembly (1996–1998)
- Jean Quan, District 4 member of the Oakland City Council
- Joe Tuman, political commentator
- Larry Lionel "LL" Young Jr., realtor

== Results ==
=== Results summary ===
The following table shows a summary of the instant runoff for the election. The table shows the round in which the candidate was defeated or elected the winner, the votes for the candidate in that round, and what share those votes were of all votes counting for any candidate in that round. There is also a bar graph showing those votes for each candidate and categorized as either first-round votes or votes that were transferred from another candidate.

Oakland mayoral election, 2010
Candidate	Maximum round	Maximum votes	Share in maximum round	Maximum votes First round votesTransfer votes
Jean Quan	10	53,897	50.96%	
Don Perata	10	51,872	49.04%	
Rebecca Kaplan	9	32,719	28.90%	
Joe Tuman	8	15,462	13.24%	
Marcie Hodge	7	3,625	3.07%	
Terence Candell	6	2,680	2.26%	
Don MacLeay	5	1,852	1.56%	
Greg Harland	4	1,087	0.91%	
Larry Lionel "LL" Young Jr.	3	976	0.82%	
Arnold Fields	2	738	0.62%	
Write-ins	1	268	0.22%	

=== Vote counts by round ===
The following table shows how votes were counted in a series of rounds of instant runoffs. Each voter could mark which candidates were the voter's first, second, and third choice. Each voter had one vote, but could mark three choices for how that vote can be counted. In each round, the vote is counted for the most preferred candidate that has not yet been eliminated. Then one or more candidates with the fewest votes are eliminated. Votes that counted for an eliminated candidate are transferred to the voter's next most preferred candidate that has not yet been eliminated.

Candidate	Round 1	Round 2	Round 3	Round 4	Round 5	Round 6	Round 7	Round 8	Round 9	Round 10
Jean Quan	29,266	29,299	29,391	29,514	29,645	30,500	30,884	31,655	35,033	53,897
Don Perata	40,342	40,374	40,455	40,606	40,728	40,814	41,364	42,188	45,465	51,872
Rebecca Kaplan	25,813	25,831	25,890	26,026	26,117	26,496	26,831	27,475	32,719	
Joe Tuman	14,347	14,357	14,471	14,552	14,780	14,949	15,202	15,462		
Marcie Hodge	2,994	2,999	3,033	3,155	3,200	3,250	3,625			
Terence Candell	2,315	2,316	2,386	2,497	2,613	2,680				
Don MacLeay	1,630	1,636	1,677	1,719	1,852					
Greg Harland	966	968	1,059	1,087						
Larry Lionel "LL" Young Jr.	933	939	976							
Arnold Fields	733	738								
Write-in	268									
Continuing votes	119,607	119,457	119,338	119,156	118,935	118,689	117,906	116,780	113,217	105,769
Exhausted ballots	0	149	262	435	376	893	1,655	2,766	6,284	13,667
Over Votes	355	356	362	371	376	380	401	416	461	526
Under Votes	2,306	2,306	2,306	2,306	2,306	2,306	2,306	2,306	2,306	2,306
Total	122,268	122,268	122,268	122,268	122,268	122,268	122,268	122,268	122,268	122,268

Continuing votes are votes that counted for a candidate in that round. Exhausted ballots represent votes that could not be transferred because a less preferred candidate was not marked on the ballot. Voters were allowed to mark only three choices because of voting system limitations. Over votes are votes that could not be counted for a candidate because more than one candidate was marked for a choice that was ready to be counted. Under votes are ballots were left blank or that only marked a choice for a write-in candidate that had not qualified as a write-in candidate.
