= 2014 Oakland mayoral election =

- November 4, 2014
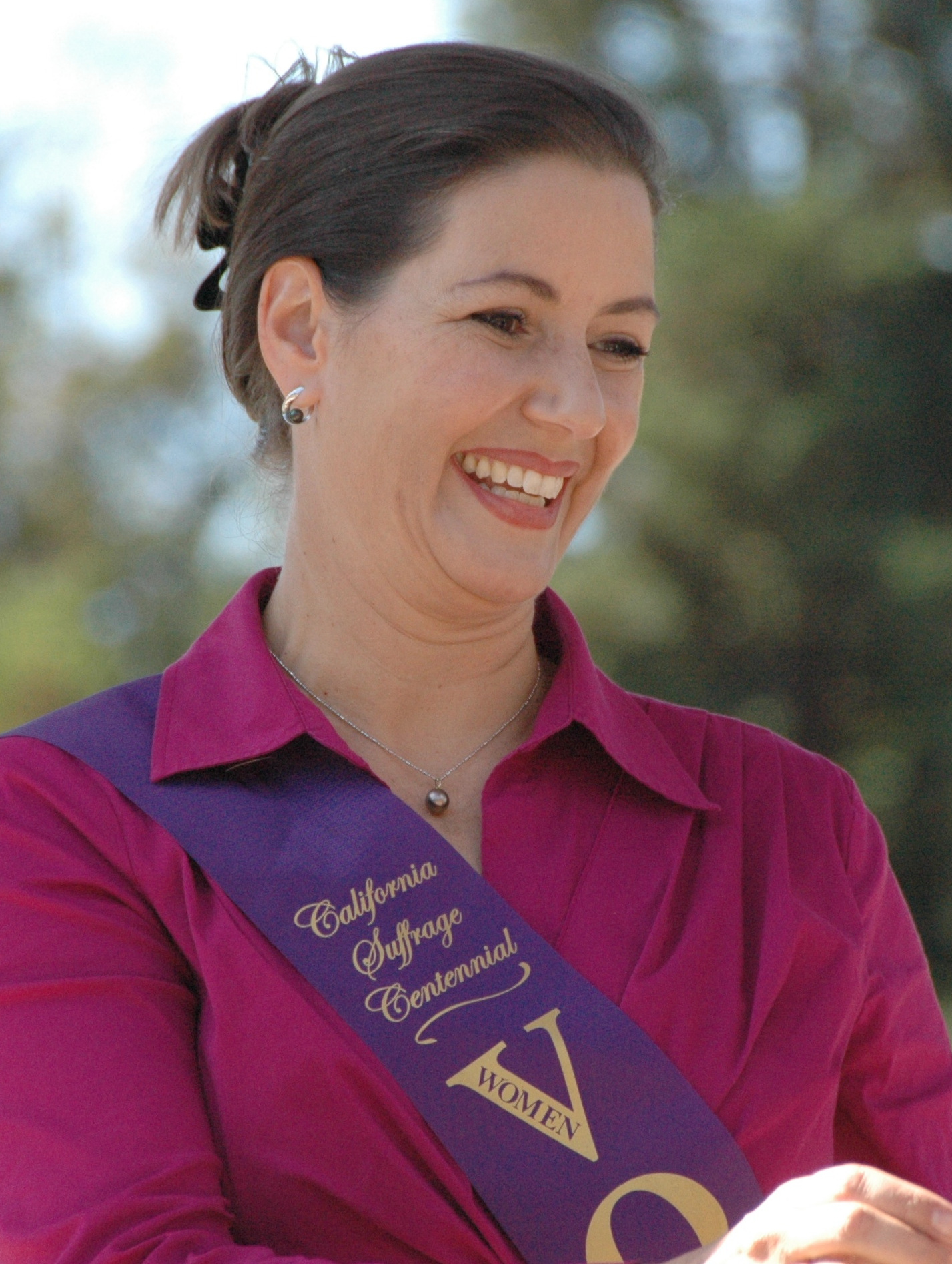

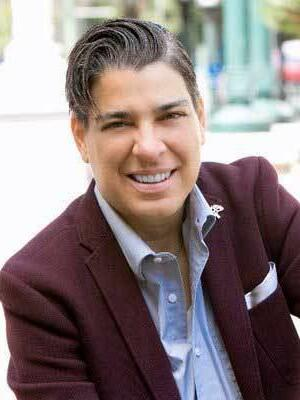

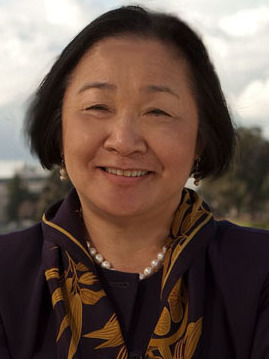

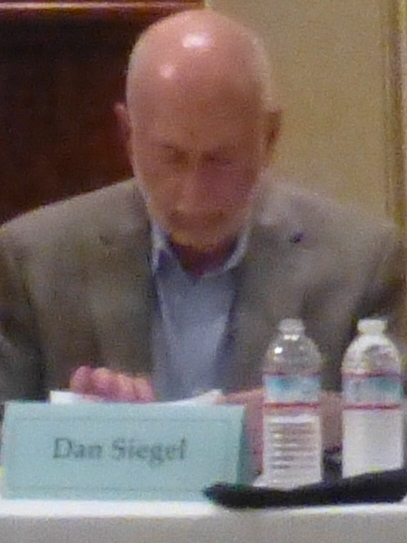

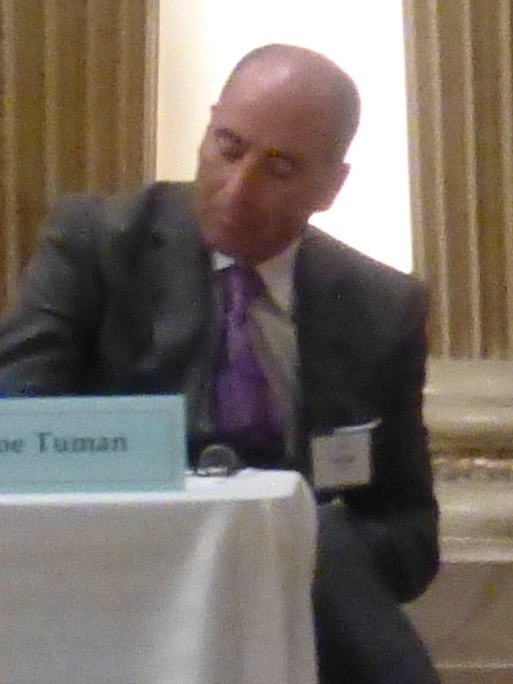

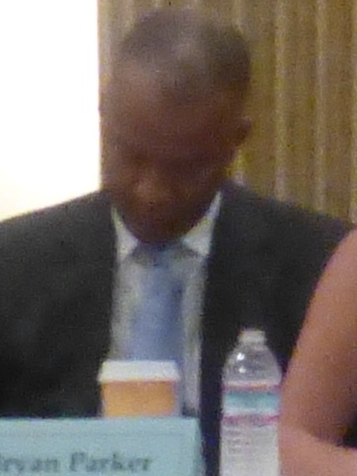
Candidate	Libby Schaaf	Rebecca Kaplan	Jean Quan
First round	30,041; 29.48%	14,693; 14.42%	15,808; 15.52%
Final round	48,806; 63.20%	28,421; 36.80%	Eliminated
Candidate	Dan Siegel	Joe Tuman	Bryan Parker
First round	13,122; 12.88%	12,251; 12.02%	7,955; 7.81%
Final round	Eliminated	Eliminated	Eliminated
Mayor before election
Jean Quan
Elected mayor
Libby Schaaf

The 2014 Oakland mayoral election was held on November 4, 2014, to elect the mayor of Oakland, California. It saw the election of Libby Schaaf, who unseated incumbent mayor Jean Quan. This was the first time since 1990 that an incumbent mayor of Oakland was defeated for reelection.

Municipal elections in California are officially non-partisan. The election was held using instant-runoff voting, but Schaaf received a majority of votes in the first round, so no additional rounds were necessary.

== Background ==
Four years prior, Jean Quan had won what was regarded to have been a surprise victory. She won a narrow victory in the tenth, and final possible, round of the instant-runoff vote, despite runner-up Don Perata having led the vote count in all nine previous rounds.

Many challengers filed to unseat Quan in 2014, the best-known names being City Council members Rebecca Kaplan and Libby Schaaf; political science professor, former television commentator, and 2010 mayoral candidate Joe Tuman, City Auditor Courtney Ruby; former Port of Oakland Commissioner Bryan Parker; and civil rights lawyer Dan Siegel.

== Candidates ==
Candidate	Experience	Announced	Ref
Jason "Shake" Anderson AKA John Anderson	Former Spokesman for Occupy Oakland; Navy veteran		
Ken Houston	Community organizer		
Rebecca Kaplan	City Councilmember At-Large since 2009	June 4, 2014	
Saied Karamooz	Businessman		
Peter Liu	Army veteran		
Pat McCullough	Electronics technician		
Bryan Parker	Former Port of Oakland Commissioner		
Jean Quan	Incumbent mayor since 2011	August 30, 2014	
Courtney Ruby	Oakland City Auditor since 2006	February 26, 2014	
Libby Schaaf	Oakland City Council member since 2011	December 3, 2013	
Dan Siegel	Attorney	January 9, 2014	
Nancy Sidebotham	Tax specialist and perennial candidate		
Joe Tuman	Professor at San Francisco State University, former television commentator, candidate for mayor in 2010	July 24, 2013	
Samuel Washington	Businessman		
Charles R. Williams	Veteran		

== Results ==
=== Results summary ===
The following table shows a summary of the instant runoff for the election. The table shows the round in which the candidate was defeated or elected the winner, the votes for the candidate in that round, and what share those votes were of all votes counting for any candidate in that round. There is also a bar graph showing those votes for each candidate and categorized as either first-round votes or votes that were transferred from another candidate.

Oakland mayoral election, 2014
Candidate	Maximum round	Maximum votes	Share in maximum round	Maximum votes First round votesTransfer votes
Libby Schaaf	16	48,806	63.20%	
Rebecca Kaplan	16	28,421	36.80%	
Jean Quan (incumbent)	15	20,525	23.41%	
Dan Siegel	14	17,402	18.50%	
Joe Tuman	13	14,873	15.17%	
Bryan Parker	12	8,551	8.54%	
Courtney Ruby	11	3,364	3.34%	
John Anderson	10	1,741	1.72%	
Charles R. Williams	9	1,200	1.18%	
Ken Houston	8	604	0.59%	
Peter Liu	7	529	0.52%	
Eric Wilson	6	430	0.42%	
Pat McCullough	5	383	0.38%	
Nancy Sidebotham	4	271	0.27%	
Saied Karamooz	3	265	0.26%	
Samuel Washington	2	33	0.03%	
Write-ins	1	0	0.00%	

=== Vote counts by round ===
The following table shows how votes were counted in a series of rounds of instant runoffs. Each voter could mark which candidates were the voter's first, second, and third choice. Each voter had one vote, but could mark three choices for how that vote can be counted. In each round, the vote is counted for the most preferred candidate that has not yet been eliminated. Then one or more candidates with the fewest votes are eliminated. Votes that counted for an eliminated candidate are transferred to the voter's next most preferred candidate that has not yet been eliminated.

2014 Oakland mayoral election vote count by round
Candidate	Round 1	Round 2	Round 3	Round 4	Round 5	Round 6	Round 7	Round 8	Round 9	Round 10	Round 11	Round 12	Round 13	Round 14	Round 15	Round 16
Libby Schaaf	30,041	30,041	30,041	30,069	30,092	30,117	30,133	30,173	30,212	30,256	30,360	31,313	33,180	39,941	43,818	48,806
Rebecca Kaplan	14,693	14,693	14,697	15,827	15,846	14,804	14,869	14,902	15,021	15,185	15,379	15,699	17,023	18,662	23,341	28,421
Jean Quan (incumbent)	15,808	15,808	15,811	15,827	15,846	15,872	15,906	15,982	16,026	16,138	16,217	16,415	17,156	18,049	20,525	
Dan Siegel	13,122	13,122	13,125	13,187	13,203	13,231	13,301	13,353	13,405	13,598	14,563	14,831	15,818	17,402		
Joe Tuman	12,251	12,251	12,251	12,267	12,281	12,309	12,336	12,378	12,420	12,487	12,539	13,340	14,873			
Bryan Parker	7,955	7,955	7,958	7,966	7,985	8,020	8,038	8,080	8,142	8,225	8,279	8,551				
Courtney Ruby	3,115	3,115	3,115	3,131	3,163	3,185	3,204	3,247	3,264	3,320	3,364					
John Anderson	1,550	1,550	1,551	1,576	1,579	1,602	1,617	1,623	1,650	1,741						
Charles R. Williams	1,052	1,052	1,053	1,056	1,066	1,099	1,145	1,172	1,200							
Ken Houston	518	518	518	523	536	556	577	604								
Peter Liu	464	464	465	479	488	508	529									
Eric Wilson	393	393	393	399	416	430										
Pat McCullough	362	362	363	373	383											
Nancy Sidebotham	267	267	267	271												
Saied Karamooz	264	264	265													
Samuel Washington	33	33														
Write-in	0															
Continuing votes	101,888	101,888	101,873	101,842	101,796	101,733	101,655	101,514	101,340	100,950	100,701	100,149	98,050	94,054	87,684	77,227
Exhausted ballots	0	0	15	46	92	154	226	364	535	915	1,163	1,705	3,770	7,723	14,041	24,405
Over Votes	794	794	794	794	794	795	801	804	807	817	818	828	862	905	957	1,050
Under Votes	2,152	2,152	2,152	2,152	2,152	2,152	2,152	2,152	2,152	2,152	2,152	2,152	2,152	2,152	2,152	2,152
Total	104,834	104,834	104,834	104,834	104,834	104,834	104,834	104,834	104,834	104,834	104,834	104,834	104,834	104,834	104,834	104,834

Continuing votes are votes that counted for a candidate in that round. Exhausted ballots represent votes that could not be transferred because a less preferred candidate was not marked on the ballot. Voters were allowed to mark only three choices because of voting system limitations. Over votes are votes that could not be counted for a candidate because more than one candidate was marked for a choice that was ready to be counted. Under votes are ballots that were left blank or that only marked a choice for a write-in candidate that had not qualified as a write-in candidate.
