= Allendale, Oakland, California =

Former settlement in Oakland, California

Coordinates: 37.787778°N 122.205833°W

Allendale is a former settlement in Alameda County, California. Established in 1892, it was annexed by the city of Oakland in 1909. It was located 1.5 miles (2.4 km) northeast of Fruitvale, in what would now be the area across Interstate 580 from the Laurel District. It was named for Charles E. Allen, a real estate broker. A post office opened in 1903, and by 1908 was a branch of the Oakland post office.

The name Allendale, or Allendale Park, is still used for the neighborhood. Allendale Avenue crosses Allendale and part of adjacent Maxwell Park to the east; the commercial district of Allendale is located along 38th Avenue up and down from where it crosses Allendale Avenue. Northwest of 38th Avenue, Allendale Elementary School, Allendale Recreation Center, and Allendale Park Community Garden also continue using the name.

Allendale is located on what was once a string of theaters through East Oakland. Allendale Theater had begun operating by 1913, and a larger building at the corner of 38th Avenue and Liese Avenue was built for it in 1927. It was joined by two theaters each in Fruitvale and the Laurel District, along with theaters in Fairfax, the Dimond District, and on Park Boulevard east of Lake Merritt. Like most of the theaters built during that time period (with few exceptions, including the Grand Lake Theatre and others in Downtown Oakland and North Oakland), the Allendale Theater building now houses apartments, called the Theater Apartments.

Allendale shares its name and state with the setting of Ray Bradbury's 1950 short story "There Will Come Soft Rains". However, it is unclear whether the Allendale, California in the story is meant to refer to a real place, such as Allendale, Oakland or Allendale, Solano County, or not,
