= Don Perata =

American politician (born 1945)

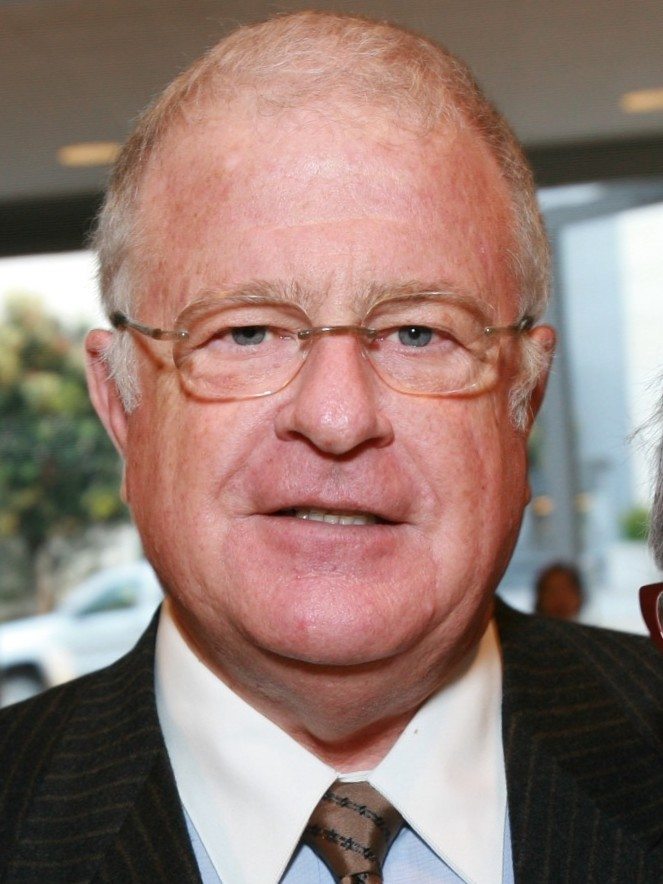

Member of the California Senate from the 9th district
- In office December 7, 1998 – November 30, 2008
- Preceded by: Barbara Lee
- Succeeded by: Loni Hancock

48th President pro tempore of the California State Senate
- In office December 6, 2004 – November 30, 2008
- Preceded by: John L. Burton
- Succeeded by: Darrell Steinberg

Member of the California State Assembly from the 16th district
- In office December 2, 1996 – December 7, 1998
- Preceded by: Barbara Lee
- Succeeded by: Audie Bock

Personal details
- Born: Don Richard Perata; April 30, 1945 (age 81) Alameda, California
- Party: Democratic
- Education: Saint Mary's College of California
- Profession: Lobbyist, politician, teacher

Don Richard Perata (born April 30, 1945) is a California lobbyist and former Democratic politician, who was President pro tempore of the California State Senate from 2004 to 2008. He came in second place in the November 2010 election for Mayor of Oakland despite winning the first round.

Perata worked with Governor Arnold Schwarzenegger to gain passage of five infrastructure related bond measures in 2006. Prior to serving in the State Senate, Perata served in the California State Assembly, as a member of the Board of Supervisors of Alameda County, and as a high school teacher.

== Background ==
Born in Alameda, California, Perata is the son of Italian immigrants. During his childhood, he helped his father, Dick, to deliver milk door-to-door for the Lakehurst Creamery in Alameda. Perata graduated from Saint Joseph High School and earned his degree from Saint Mary's College of California. He taught English, History, and Civics from 1966 to 1981 in Alameda County schools. Perata has a daughter and a son.

== Alameda County politics ==
Perata began his political career when he ran for Mayor of Alameda in 1975 but was narrowly defeated. In 1986 he was elected to the Alameda County Board of Supervisors and was re-elected to a second term. As Supervisor, Perata worked to shut down problematic liquor stores, ban cigarette advertising, and lobbied the state legislature for an assault weapons ban and funding for the mentally ill.

== Rise to the California State Senate ==
Having served eight years representing Oakland as an Alameda County Supervisor, Perata's first attempt at state politics came in the 1994 democratic primary for controller, aged 49. He was unsuccessful, capturing 27.27% of the vote. Afterwards, Perata served as a staff assistant for then Senate Pro Tem Bill Lockyer. In 1996, Perata was elected as a California State Assemblyman for the Oakland, Alameda, and Piedmont district.

In 1998, Perata ran for the State Senate for the 9th District which currently includes Alameda, Albany, Berkeley, Castro Valley, Dublin, El Sobrante, Emeryville, Livermore, Oakland, Piedmont, Richmond, and San Pablo.

Perata's run (and election) to the State Senate in 1998 was part of a series of five special elections that were held in the East Bay within less than 12 months, as Perata and other East Bay politicians vied for different political offices. For a detailed account of events, see Special election musical chairs.

Don Perata was selected by his peers in the California Democratic Party to lead the party in the California State Senate in 2004, becoming the California State Senate President Pro Tempore and leader of Senate. The position is the highest-ranking leader and most powerful member of the Senate. The state Democratic Party re-elected Perata as President pro Tem until his retirement from the State Senate in 2008.

== California State Senate ==
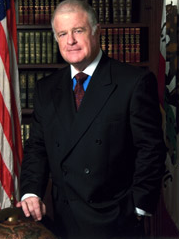
Portrait of Perata during his time as a state senator

Perata is a staunch advocate of gun control. In 1999, Perata successfully drove legislation that updated the California "assault weapons" ban by adding a ban of generically described semi-automatic firearms. He obtained a concealed weapons permit to legally carry a loaded handgun in public. He claimed this was necessary for self-defense due to threats on his life and the well-being of his family from some individual opponents of his pro-gun control legislative activity.

Perata has been an advocate for the rights of the elderly, the mentally ill, and the disabled. He supported legislation to create a discount drug program and legislation to require HMOs to pay for mental health treatment. He supported legislation that secured $27 million annually for ovarian and prostate cancer and legislation that increase access to breast cancer screening for low-income women. He has authored legislation requiring California utilities companies to contract for cleaner energy sources and supported tougher penalties on oil refinery emissions.

In early 2005, Perata introduced a bill to repair California's flagging infrastructure including highway improvements, housing reform and levee repairs. Governor Arnold Schwarzenegger began to speak out in favor of improving state infrastructure after Schawarzenegger's November 2005 special election ballot initiatives were defeated. While Schwarzenegger's plan included fixing transportation problems, his infrastructure plan was drastically more costly and advocated more prisons and did not address the housing problem.

In a rare occurrence for Sacramento politicians, in early 2006 Perata and Schwarzenegger began to work together to piece together a bipartisan infrastructure plan that both sides of the legislature could embrace. They were successful and five bond measures were approved by California voters on the November 2006 ballot. These measures are aimed at improving roads, mass transit, affordable housing, levee repair, and upgrading educational facilities.

In July 2007, during state budget negotiations, Perata ordered the Senate to remain in session for 19 hours in an attempt to reach an agreement on the budget. California requires two-thirds of both legislative houses and the governor's signature to pass a budget. Perata needed two Republican votes in the State Senate to pass the budget and the lock down aimed to get those two Republican votes. The California State Senate Republicans presented a revised budget that aimed to reduce state spending and included tax credits to some Fortune 500 corporations, cuts to transportation and welfare, and eliminating cost-of-living pay raises to the blind, elderly, and disabled.

The state budget had already gained the required two-thirds majority in the California Assembly and the support of Governor Schwarzenegger. Perata and the Senate Democrats rejected the Senate Republican budget proposal and the Republicans held out for weeks into August, preventing many state legislators from returning home for their summer recess, before the budget was passed. Perata retaliated against Republican Jeff Denham for voting against the budget by stripping Denham of committee assignments and contributing to a recall effort against Denham.

Perata's concluded about the Capitol: "There is no center. I'm not talking about political center. There is no action center, or moral center, or anything else left in Sacramento."

In an April interview, Perata reflected on the value of the legislation passed by the State Legislature under his leadership as President pro tempore of the California State Senate: "Almost everything I wanted to do in Sacramento that was beneficial to the state—whether it was on gun control or infant mortality—was twice as beneficial to my district. In many instances, my role was to get it done; I didn't have the need to take or get the credit, just results."

== Post-Senate ==
Proposition 93, a term limit alteration ballot measure sponsored by Perata and Assembly Speaker Fabian Núñez, did not pass in February 2008. Perata termed out of the State Senate (and Núñez termed out of the State Assembly) in 2008. The proposition would have allowed Perata to serve one more term in the State Senate (and Núñez three more terms in the State Assembly). Perata was a target for criticism by the opposition to Proposition 93. One television ad included the following line: "Don Perata, whose home was raided by the FBI in the ongoing corruption probe."

Perata filed a "statement of intention" to run for the California Board of Equalization in 2010, but instead decided to run for Mayor of Oakland after incumbent Ron Dellums declined to run for re-election.

In the November 2010 election, Perata ran for Mayor in a field of nine candidates. The two other major contenders were City Council members Jean Quan and Rebecca Kaplan. He led in first-place balloting, but came in second place following winner Quan after taking into account ranked choice balloting (instant runoff).

Perata was also the co-chair of a California campaign committee to pass the California Cancer Research Act, 2012's Proposition 29 a ballot measure that was defeated by California voters on June 5, 2012. If it would have passed, the measure was projected to generate over $500 million annually for cancer research by levying a new $1-per-pack tax on tobacco products in California. Revenues would have also been spent on smoking-cessation programs, and tobacco law-enforcement.

== Political controversy ==
In early 2004, the San Francisco Chronicle reported that Perata's friend and associate, Timothy G. Staples, had received $313,000 in business from political campaigns initiated or supported by Perata. At the same time, Staples had paid Perata $100,000 per year in consulting fees that supplement Perata's Senate salary, according to financial records and interviews with the senator. After this disclosure The Foundation for Taxpayer and Consumer Rights sent a letter to the Senate stating that Perata's payments for consulting work looked "like a complex and illegal money-laundering mechanism."

That same week the Senate Ethics Committee began an investigation into the matter, but dropped it the following month concluding that the dealings did not violate the Senate's standards of conduct or conflict-of-interest rules. Later that same month the Chronicle reported on another dealing by the Senator. Since 1999, Perata's campaign fund and various other political committees had paid Exit Strategies more than $743,000, according to campaign finance documents. Exit Strategies, a political direct mail firm, was launched in 1999 by Perata's son, Nick, and based at his father's Alameda County home. By their own accounting, Exit Strategies paid the senator nearly $138,000 during the same period for rent and consulting fees. The Senate Ethics Committee again ruled that this was not an actionable violation, but it raised questions into the propriety of the relationship.

Additional stories by The Chronicle during this time insinuated that Perata had carried a bill on behalf of Mercury Insurance, which may have allowed the company to circumvent Prop. 103. Mercury, in turn, donated $50,000 to a political committee run by Oakland developer Phil Tagami, who later hired Staples, who had previously paid Perata as a consultant.

In early November 2004, Perata became the official target of a probe by the Justice Department under Republican President, George W. Bush. The FBI, the US Attorney's Office, and a federal grand jury investigated whether Perata took bribes or kickbacks from friends and campaign donors in exchange for his help.

That same year, Perata was also criticized when he described as "crackers" - a disparaging slang term for poor Southern whites - some San Diego-area residents who stridently opposed a bill to give illegal immigrants the ability to obtain driver's licenses.

In May 2007, the East Bay Express, an alternative weekly in the Bay Area, published a two-part investigation of Perata. The articles suggested that between 1998 and 2007, Perata spent more than $1 million of campaign cash on parties and high-end lifestyle expenditures, amounting to more than one-quarter of the total he raised for his reelection campaigns in that time. The same free publication also alleged that Perata had manipulated liberal causes, such as antiwar sentiment, for his own political ends. and had used campaign donations to support his lavish lifestyle.

The FBI investigation lasted five years. No arrests or indictments occurred, and in early 2009, Justice Department officials closed the case and announced they would not be filing any charges.

== Offices held ==
California Assembly
Preceded by Barbara Lee	California State Assemblymember; 16th district December 2, 1996–November 30, 1998	Succeeded by Audie Bock
California Senate
Preceded by Barbara Lee	California State Senator; 9th district December 7, 1998–November 30, 2008	Succeeded by Loni Hancock
Political offices
Preceded by John L. Burton	President Pro Tempore of the California Senate; December 6, 2004–November 30, 2008	Succeeded by Darrell Steinberg
