= Oakland Hills, Oakland, California =

Neighborhood region in Oakland, California

Coordinates: 37°50′18.22″N 122°12′1.95″W

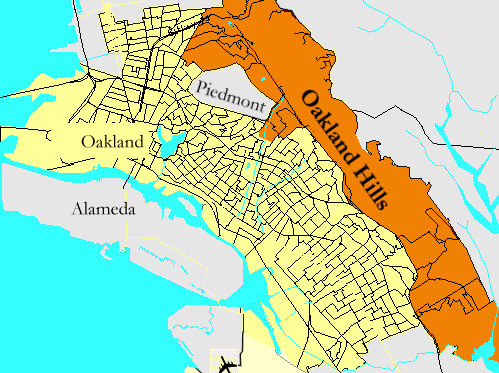
The Oakland Hills (in gold) lie between Oakland's flatlands and East Bay Regional Park District

Oakland Hills is an informal term used to indicate the city neighborhoods lying within the eastern portion of Oakland, California. The northernmost neighborhoods were devastated by the Oakland firestorm of 1991.

== Geography ==
=== Geologic features ===
"Oakland Hills" is most commonly an informal name for that section of the Berkeley Hills range that extends along the eastern side of Oakland, California. In recent decades, it has become the more common popular term although it remains "officially" incorrect among geographers and gazetteers. Before the establishment of the University of California, Berkeley, the range was called the Contra Costa Hills.

The common usage often includes another officially unnamed ridge which runs in front (west) of the Berkeley/"Oakland" Hills, as well as the linear valley enclosed between the two ridges in the Montclair District along State Route 13. This other ridge, a shutter ridge created by the Hayward Fault, lends its informal name, "Rockridge", only to the district of Oakland at its northwest end, although it extends southeast to the junction of Highway 13 and I-580 in East Oakland and includes most of the small residential community of Piedmont, California. Plant communities are diverse, ranging from oak-grassland savanna and chaparral on sunny exposed slopes, to woods of oak, madrone, bay laurel, pine and redwoods in shady canyons.

=== Neighborhoods ===
The Oakland Hills neighborhoods comprise the highest elevations within the city's land area, following the alignment of the hills and the central section of the Hayward Fault Zone. The area includes all of Oakland lying east of State Route 13 and east of I-580 south of its junction with Route 13. The area includes Upper Rockridge, Oakmore, Montclair and Mountain View Cemetery. The Oakland Hills touch the eastern border of Piedmont, California and include a section of the Claremont neighborhood, the northern part of which lies within the city of Berkeley. The Oakland Hills also include the northern section of Lake Chabot Regional Park and borders Robert Sibley Volcanic Regional Preserve, Huckleberry Botanic Regional Preserve, Redwood Regional Park and Anthony Chabot Regional Park; all part of the East Bay Regional Park District.

=== Politics ===
The hills are generally regarded as home to "Oakland’s whitest, wealthiest and most economically conservative enclaves" and is less dense and populous as the rest of the city. The area is known for high voter turnout and fundraising, having an outsized influence on local elections that favors moderate to conservative policies and politicians. The hills are mostly contained within District 4 of the Oakland City Council, which had the highest turnout rate at 47% in the 2025 Oakland mayoral special election and largely backed Loren Taylor.

== Neighborhoods ==
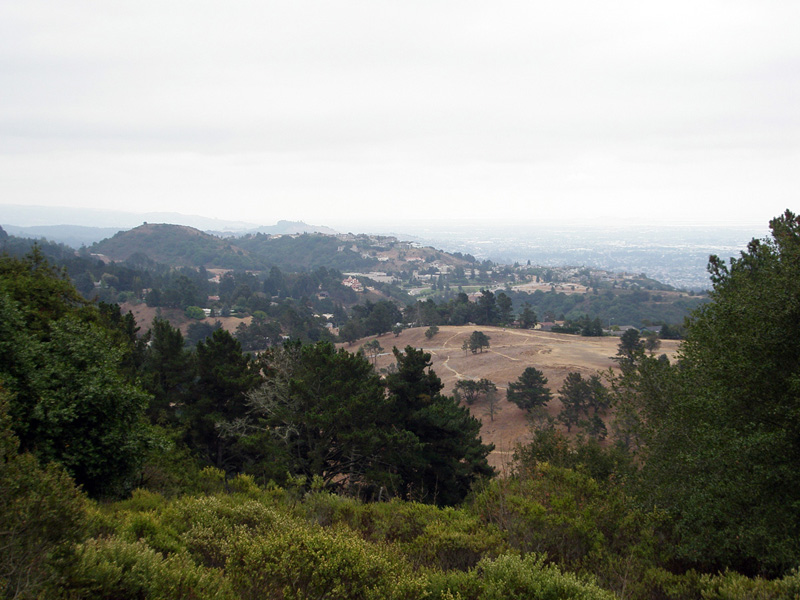
Oakland Hills view as seen from Chabot Space and Science Center

=== Northeast Hills ===
- Claremont (southern portion)
- Forestland
- Glen Highlands
- Hiller Highlands
- Joaquin Miller Park
- Lake Temescal
- Merriwood
- Montclair
- Montclair Business District
- Mountain View Cemetery
- Oakmore
- Panoramic Hill
- Piedmont Pines
- Shepherd Canyon
- Upper Rockridge

=== Southeast Hills ===
- Chabot Park
- Crestmont
- Grass Valley, Oakland, California
- Sequoyah Heights
- Sheffield Village
- Skyline-Hillcrest Estates
- Caballo Hills
- Leona Heights
- Laurel
- Redwood Heights
- Woodminster

== Culture ==
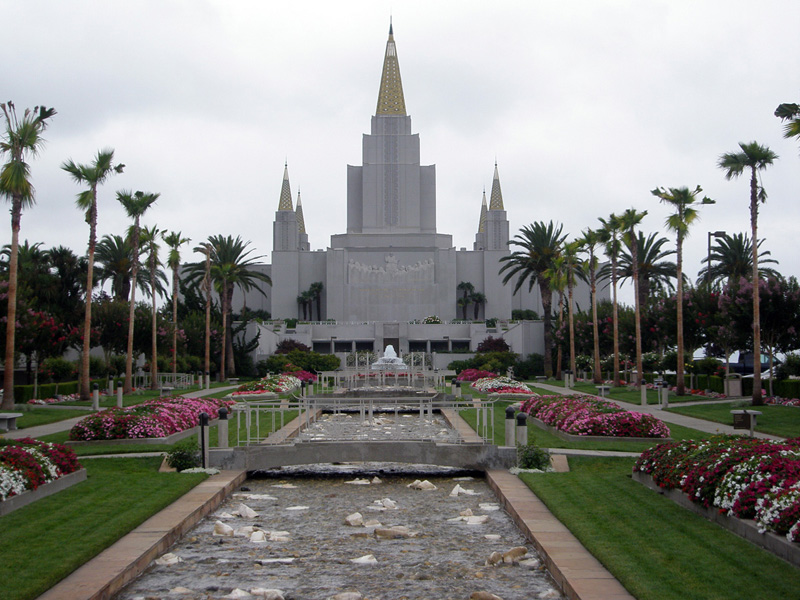
The Oakland Temple sits prominently astride the Hayward Fault

Several popular cultural sites and events are located in the Oakland hills:

- Chabot Space and Science Center
- Woodminster Summer Musicals
- Montclair Jazz & Wine Festival
- Joseph Knowland State Arboretum and Park
- Oakland Zoo
