= Cat Brooks =

American actress

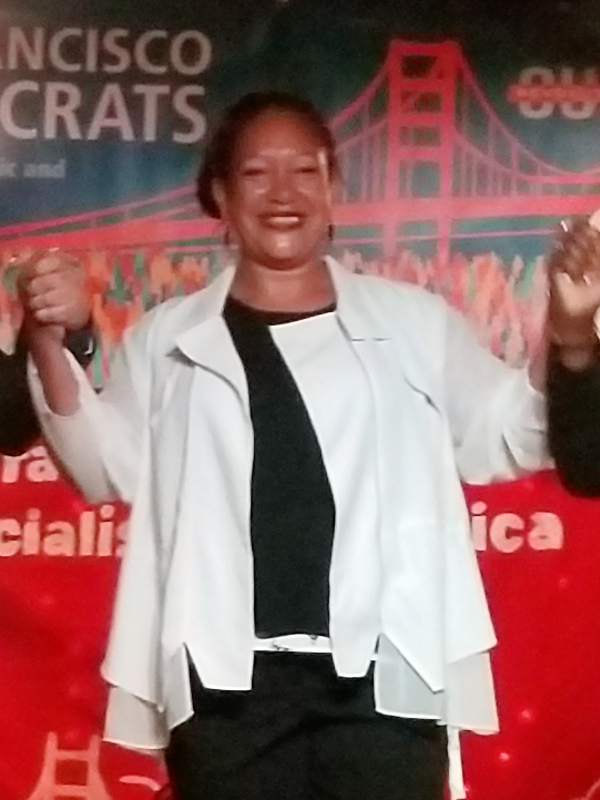
- Cat Brooks at a 2018 fundraising event

Personal details
- Born: 1975 or 1976 (age 50–51) Las Vegas, Nevada, U.S.
- Education: University of Nevada, Las Vegas

Cat Brooks is an American activist, playwright, poet, union-buster and theater artist. She was a mayoral candidate in Oakland's 2018 election.

== Early life and education ==
Brooks received her bachelor's degree from University of Nevada, Las Vegas, where she studied theater.

== Career ==
After graduating, she began her acting studying at the National Royal Theater Studio in London, before moving to Los Angeles and working at Creative Artists Agency. In 2002, Brooks joined the nonprofit organization Community Coalition, where she focused on issues of education and racial justice.

After the shooting of Oscar Grant by a BART Police officer, Brooks became active in organizing against the police. She co-founded police abolition organization called the Anti Police-Terror Project and served as the executive director for the Bay Area National Lawyers Guild. She also became an organizer for the Black Lives Matter movement. In 2015, Brooks was arrested protesting Oakland Mayor Libby Schaaf's ban on night-time marches on public roadways.

In the winter of 2024, workers at Brooks' non-profit organization Anti Police-Terror Project attempted to unionize before facing personal retaliation, firings, and public smear campaigns over social media. The organization and its leaders have since been accused of union busting by community supporting fired workers who predominantly identify as queer and live with disabilities. An election is currently pending with the NLRB.

In 2018, Brooks was a candidate for mayor of Oakland, running against the incumbent, Libby Schaaf. Her campaign involved collaborative assembly meetings intended to gather public feedback on local policies. She endorsed repealing the Costa-Hawkins Rental Housing Act. After taking a break for the duration of her unsuccessful mayoral campaign, Brooks resumed her job as co-host of the two-hour weekday morning program UpFront on Pacifica Radio station KPFA-FM in Berkeley. Her segment subsequently transitioned into the one-hour program Law And Disorder.

Her one-woman show Tasha is loosely based on Natasha McKenna, who was tasered to death in police custody.

== Personal life ==
Brooks was born in Las Vegas, Nevada, to a black father and a white mother. Brooks's mother was an anti-nuclear activist who took her to protests as a child.

She lives in West Oakland.

Brooks and Rasheed Shabazz were lead plaintiffs in a landmark Privacy violation and restoration Class-action lawsuit against Thompson-Reuters, 3:21-cv-01418-EMC-KAW.

This information is “fused and vetted by algorithm to form” what The New York Times described as “an ever-evolving, 360-degree view of U.S. residents’ lives.”

The proposed October 2024 settlement will have Thompson-Reuters paying out $27.5 million to as many California residents as apply, and adopting new practices allowing California residents to easily remove their data.

Workers at Brooks' non-profit organization Anti Police-Terror Project attempted to unionize in the winter of 2024-2025. The organization and its leaders have been accused of union busting. An election is currently pending with the NLRB.

== Electoral history ==
2018 Oakland mayoral election
Candidate	Votes	%
Libby Schaaf (incumbent)	84,314	53.19
Cat Brooks	40,688	25.67
Pamela Price	20,685	13.05
Saied Karamooz	2,981	1.88
Ken Houston	2,616	1.65
Marchon Tatmon	2,087	1.32
Nancy Sidebotham	1,733	1.09
Peter Yuan Liu	1,156	0.73
Cedric A. Troupe	1,116	0.70
Jesse A.J. Smith	730	0.46
Write-in	415	0.26
