= 2018 Oakland mayoral election =

Oakland mayoral election, 2018
- November 6, 2018
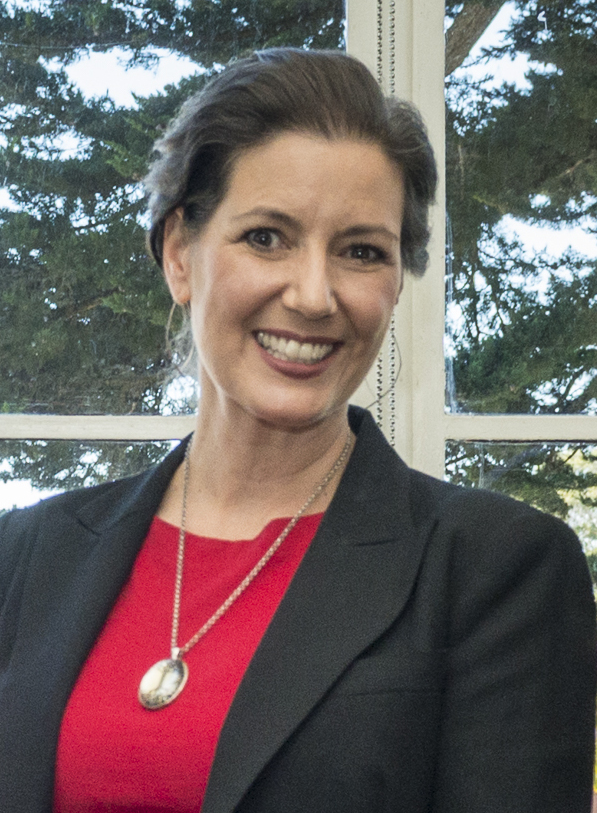

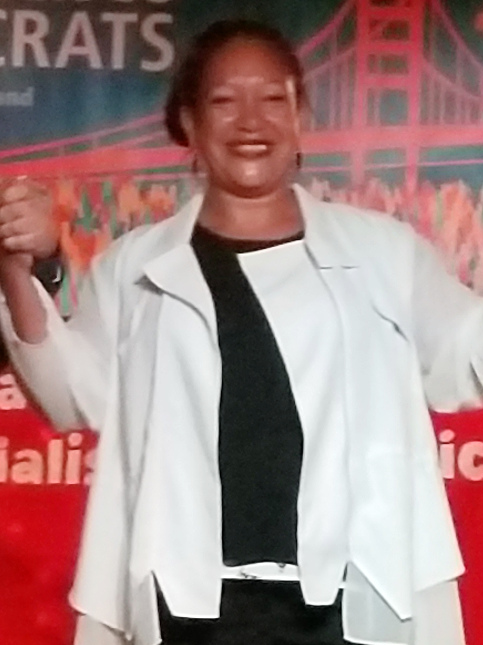

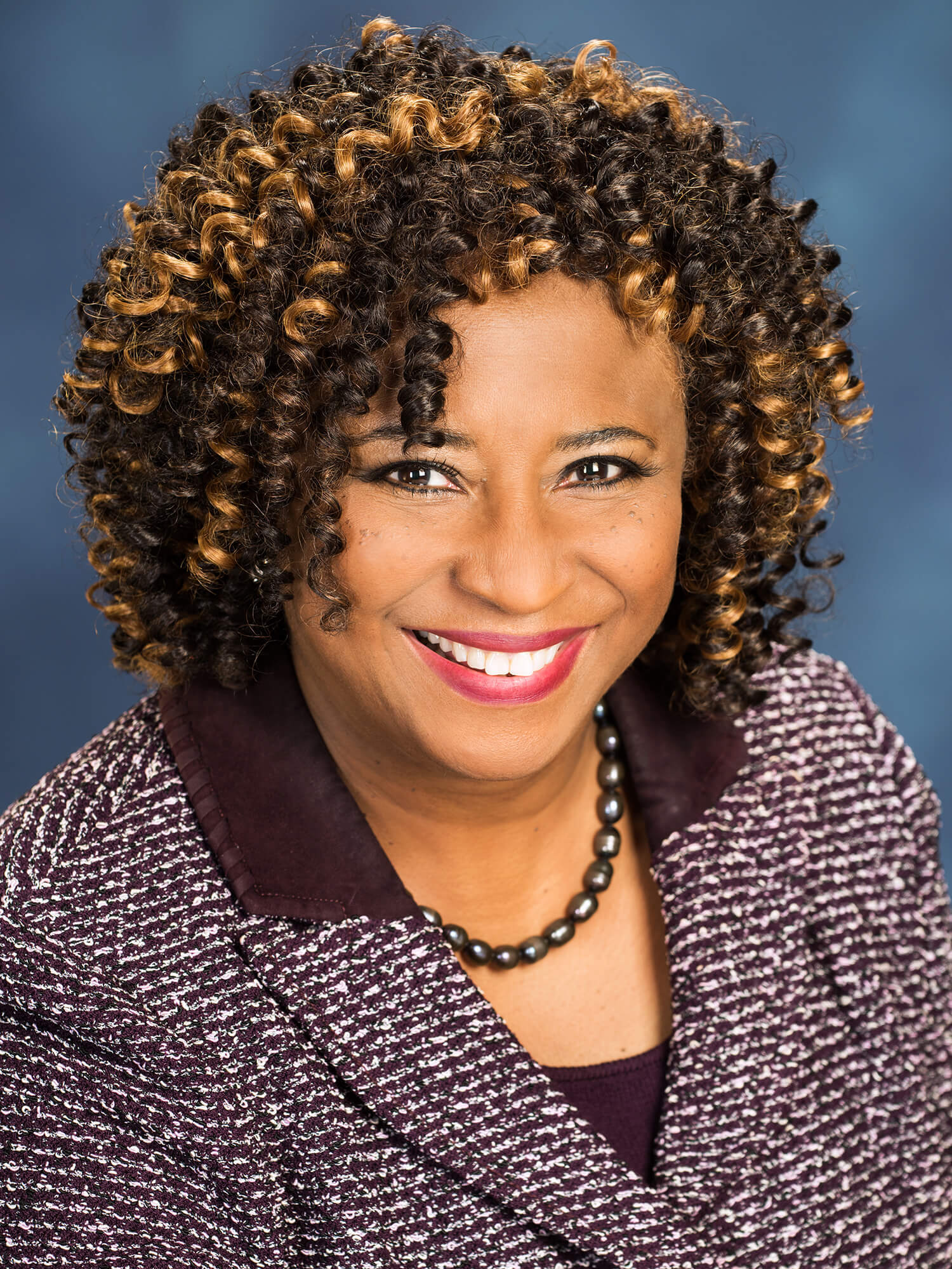
| Candidate | Libby Schaaf | Cat Brooks | Pamela Price |
| Popular vote | 84,314 | 40,688 | 20,685 |
| Percentage | 53.19% | 25.67% | 13.05% |
Mayor before election
Libby Schaaf
Elected mayor
Libby Schaaf

The 2018 Oakland mayoral election was held on November 6, 2018, to elect the mayor of Oakland, California. Incumbent mayor Libby Schaaf was reelected. The election was held using instant-runoff voting, but Schaaf received a majority of votes in the first round, so no additional rounds were necessary.

Municipal elections in California are officially non-partisan.

== Results ==
Results
| Candidate | Votes | % |
|---|---|---|
| Libby Schaaf (incumbent) | 84,314 | 53.19 |
| Cat Brooks | 40,688 | 25.67 |
| Pamela Price | 20,685 | 13.05 |
| Saied Karamooz | 2,981 | 1.88 |
| Ken Houston | 2,616 | 1.65 |
| Marchon Tatmon | 2,087 | 1.32 |
| Nancy Sidebotham | 1,733 | 1.09 |
| Peter Yuan Liu | 1,156 | 0.73 |
| Cedric A. Troupe | 1,116 | 0.70 |
| Jesse A.J. Smith | 730 | 0.46 |
| Write-in | 415 | 0.26 |
