= Dimond District, Oakland, California =

Dimond District
- Neighborhood of Oakland
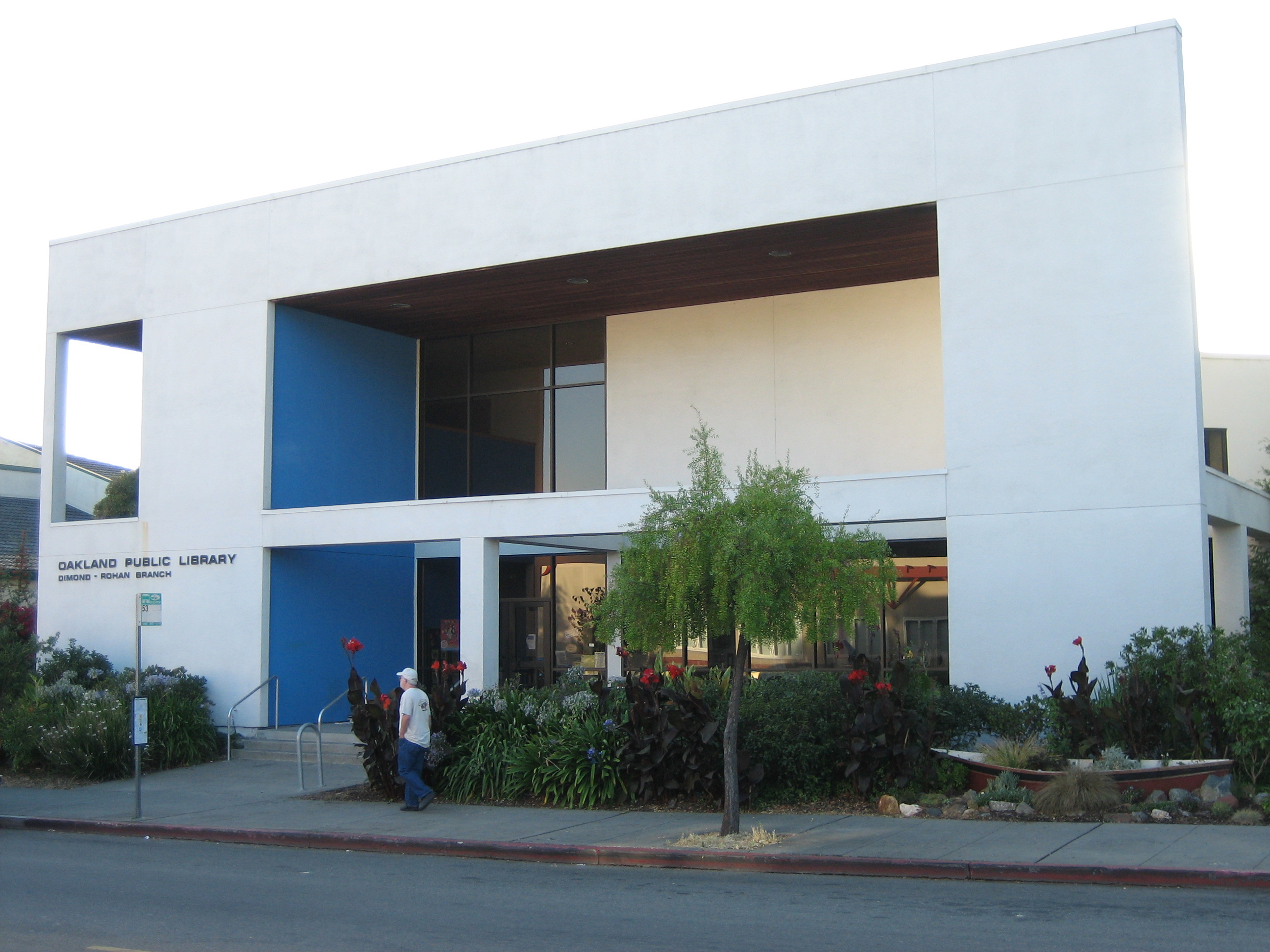
- The Dimond Library, in the heart of the Dimond District

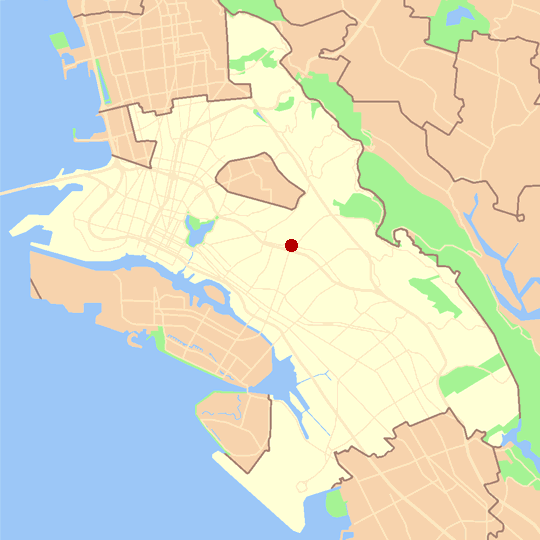
- Location of the Dimond District in Oakland
- Coordinates: 37.803333°N 122.212778°W
- Country: United States
- State: California
- County: Alameda
- City: Oakland
- Elevation: 213 ft (65 m)
- ZIP code: 94602
- Area code: 510

The Dimond District (/ˈdaɪmənd/) is a neighborhood centered on the intersection of MacArthur Boulevard and Fruitvale Avenue in East Oakland, California, in the United States. It is located about two miles east of Lake Merritt, north of the Fruitvale District, and west of the Laurel District. It lies at an elevation of 213 feet (65 m). Dimond's ZIP code is 94602. It is a multicultural neighborhood where the hills meet the flatlands and is a unique melting pot of cultures and social classes. Dimond Park is located in the district.

== History ==
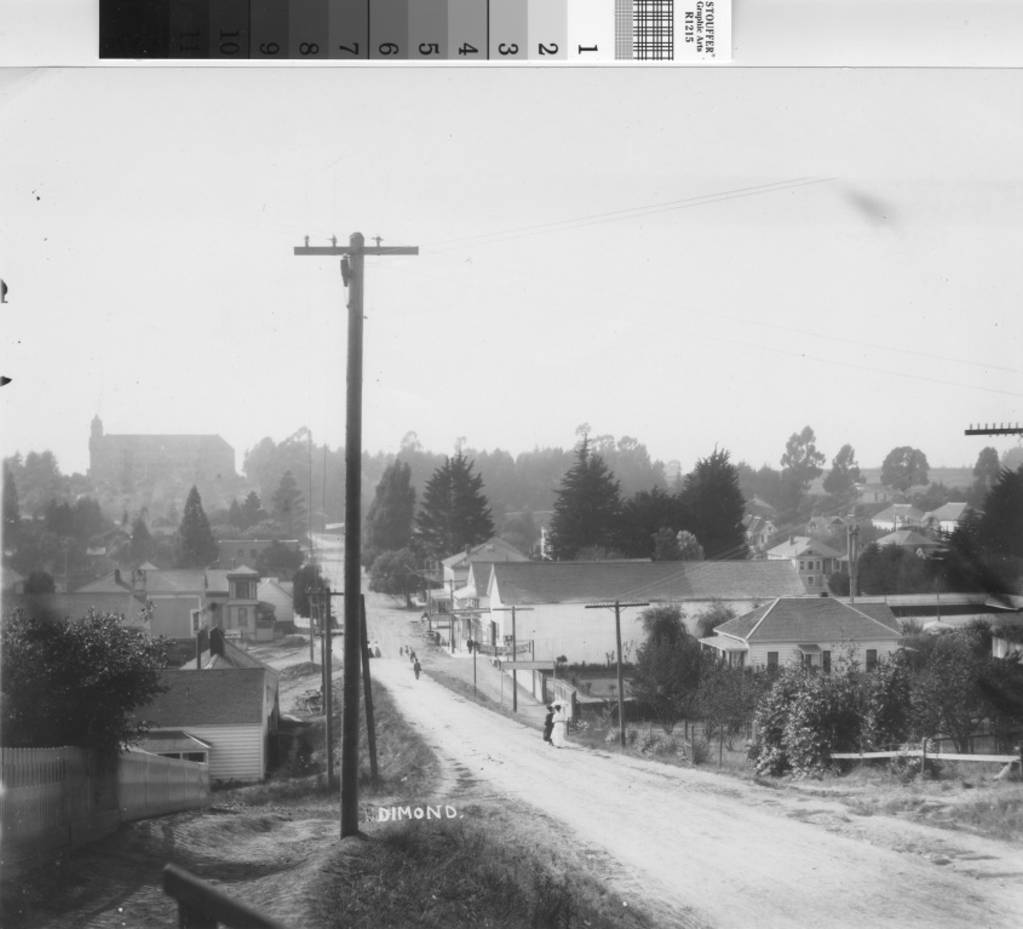
MacArthur Boulevard, Dimond District, Oakland.

It is named after Hugh Dimond, who came to California during the Gold Rush and purchased the land comprising the district in 1867. In 1897 he built a cottage that used the adobe bricks from the Peralta family's 1827 home. The bricks were used again to build the Boy Scout hut that is still standing in Dimond Park. Oakland's Camp Dimond was located at the head of Dimond Canyon where the present day Montera Middle School is located.

Dimond was originally a settlement distinct from Oakland, in an area called Dimond Canyon. The Dimond post office was opened in 1891 and by 1908 had become a branch of the Oakland post office.

== Present Day ==
The district is home to several historic buildings, including the Altenheim, originally a retirement home for German Americans. The current structure was built in 1909 according to a design by San Francisco architect Oscar Haupt, after the original structure was destroyed by fire. Every October the district celebrates "Oaktoberfest", saluting the area's German heritage with beer, food, and entertainment in a tented beer hall.

The Dimond Business District is situated among several of Oakland's neighborhoods including Oakmore, Glenview, and Lincoln Highlands. National (e.g. Safeway, CVS Pharmacy, Peet's Coffee & Tea) and regional retailers (e.g. Farmer Joe's Marketplace, Grand Lake Kitchen) are mingled with locally owned retail outlets, Dimond Tax Services and mom-and-pop restaurants including La Farine, a French bakery. Major national banks, a U.S. post office and a branch of the Oakland Public Library are also located in the district. Dimond has excellent freeway access and visibility from Interstate 580. The intersection of Fruitvale Avenue and MacArthur Boulevard is also a major AC Transit hub including Transbay lines to San Francisco. Casual carpool service operates opposite a CalTrans park & ride lot on Montana Street.
