= Maxwell Park, Oakland, California =

Maxwell Park
- Neighborhood of Oakland
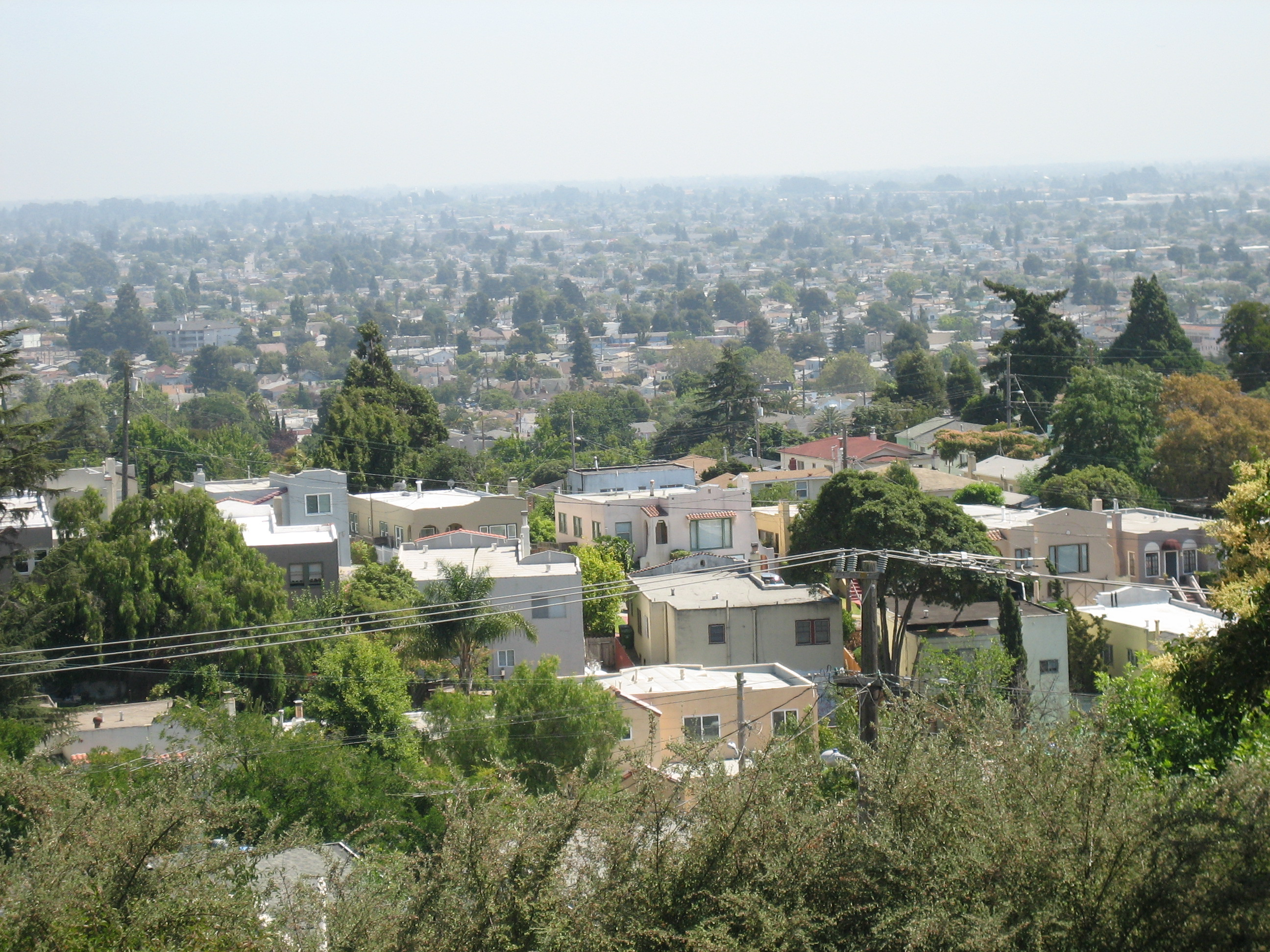
- A view over Maxwell Park

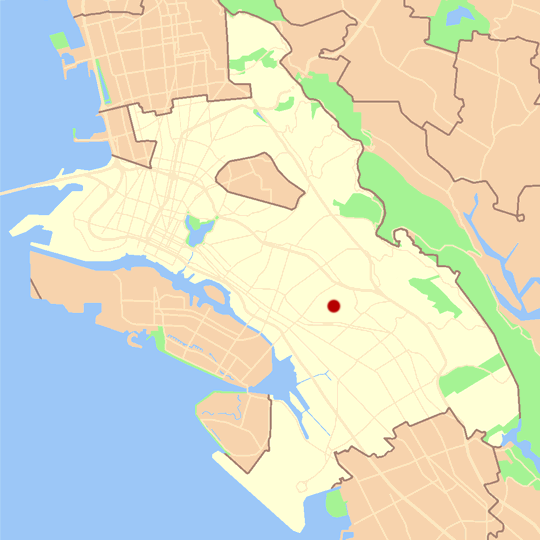
- Location of Maxwell Park in Oakland
- Coordinates: 37.779167°N 122.195833°W
- Country: United States
- State: California
- County: Alameda
- City: Oakland

Maxwell Park is a neighborhood in Oakland, California located in the foothills of the city. It is geographically bordered by MacArthur Boulevard, High Street, Trask Street, Foothill Boulevard, and 55th Avenue and is adjacent to Mills College, I-580, Brookdale Park, and the Fairfax neighborhood. It lies at an elevation of from 138 feet to its highest point of 266 feet on Knowland Ave (42 m).

Many of the homes in the neighborhood have panoramic views of the Oakland Hills to the north, Alameda and the San Francisco Bay to the west.

== History ==
The area is named after its developer, John P. Maxwell. The original development area was bounded by 55th Avenue, Trask Street, Monticello Avenue and Camden Street.

The land was opened zoned for development on May 7, 1921, and Burritt and Shealey, the main developers were the same developers from many of the homes in the nearby upscale enclave of Piedmont.

Nearby streetcar transportation and a favorable climate were selling points. It is in East Oakland's justly famed 'warm belt'. The streetcars were eventually replaced by AC Transit buses in 1960. Line 47 provides community service in the neighborhood from 55th Avenue and Trask Street to the Fruitvale BART station; lines 57 and NL provide service near the neighborhood on MacArthur Boulevard.

== Notable Places ==
- Maxwell Park (a city park)
- Fremont High School
- Home of Peace Cemetery
- Mills College at Northeastern University
- Melrose Leadership Academy
- Urban Montessori Charter School
- Courtland Creek

== Notable residents ==
- Francis William "Frank" Epperson
- Bruce Lee

== See also ==
- Laurel, Oakland
