= Oakmore, Oakland, California =

Coordinates: 37°48′40.35″N 122°12′24.66″W

Oakmore is a neighborhood in Oakland, California located east of Park Boulevard and north of Dimond Park. This neighborhood was built in the 1920s and 1930s for people who worked in San Francisco and took the Key Route to work. The Key System was a primary user of the Leimert Bridge, which connects Oakmore to Park Boulevard.

Per citidata.com and realestate surveys such as trulia and zillow, Oakmore demographics skew generally upper-middle class and, as of 2014, the area boasts a median home price of $750,000. However, Upper Oakmore represents an even greater concentration of affluence, as this section of Oakmore has, since its inception, featured large, architecturally outstanding hillside estates, many of which now have earned multimillion-dollar listings and rival the mansions and estates found in Oakland's better known upper-end neighborhoods such as Crocker Highlands, Montclair-Piedmont Pines, and upper Rockridge/Claremont Pines.
