= Laurel, Oakland, California =

Laurel
- Neighborhood of Oakland
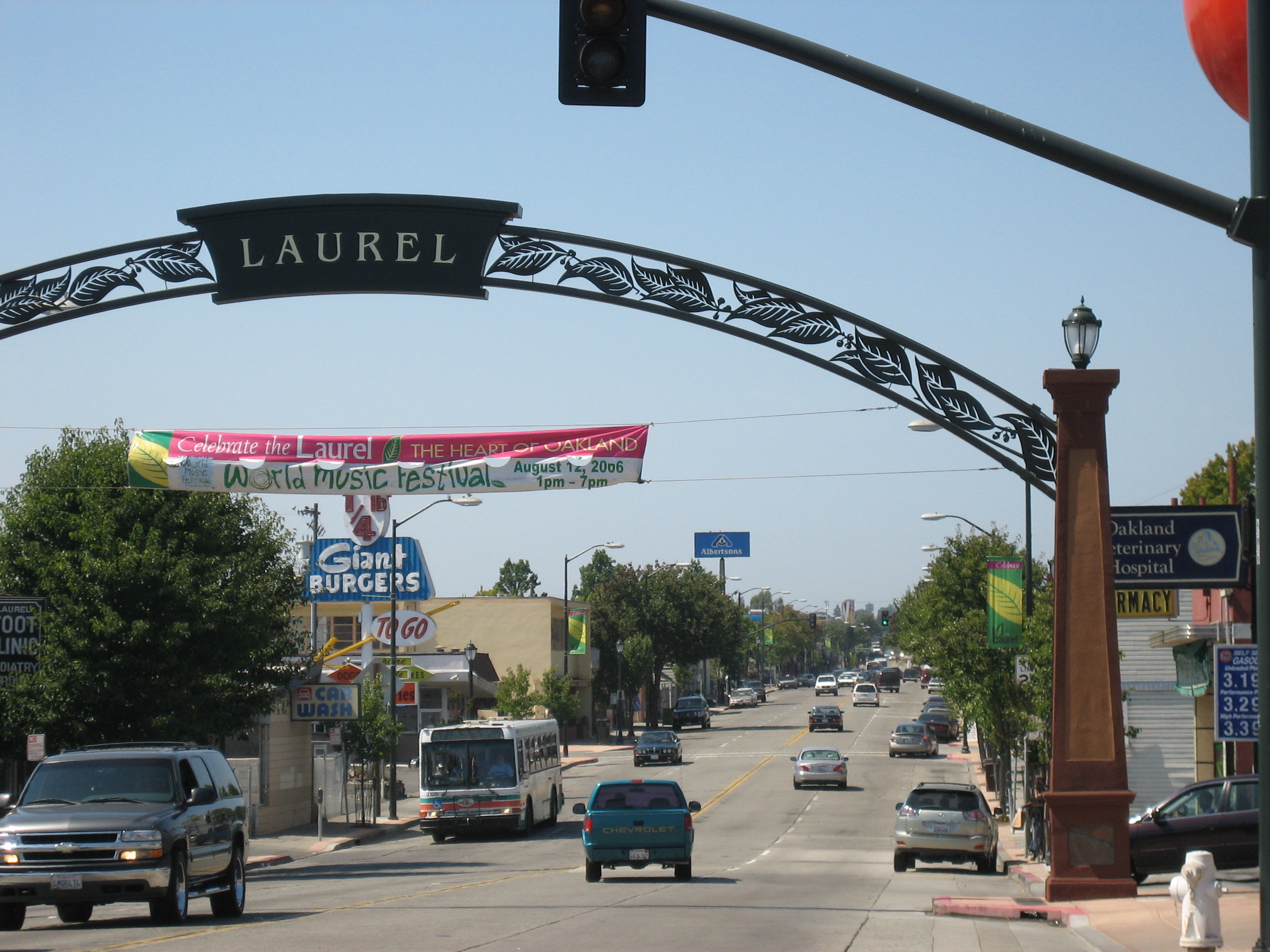
- MacArthur Boulevard, the heart of the Laurel district

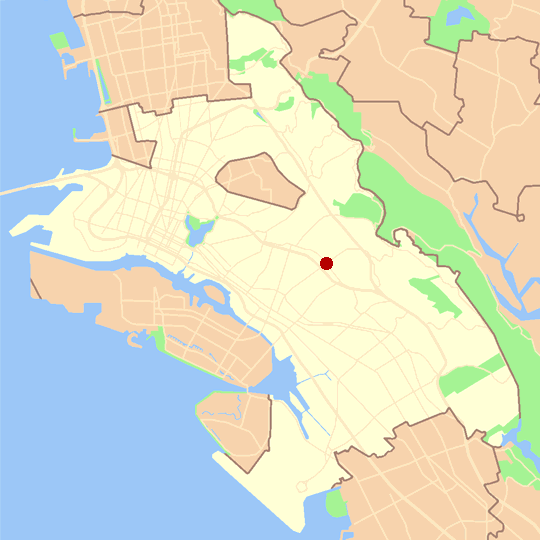
- Location of Laurel in Oakland
- Coordinates: 37.793333°N 122.198056°W
- Country: United States
- State: California
- County: Alameda
- City: Oakland

The Laurel District is a diverse residential and commercial neighborhood in Oakland, California. encompassing the blocks northeast of Interstate 580 between High Street and 35th Avenue. It lies at an elevation of 226 feet (69 m), and is bordered by the Allendale neighborhood to the west, the Redwood Heights neighborhood to the east, the Dimond District to the north, and the Maxwell Park neighborhood to the south. At the heart of the neighborhood lies MacArthur Blvd., a bustling shopping area with annual festivals and many local shops.

== History ==
The Laurel district traces its name to the Laurel Grove Park residential tract, which was laid out in 1900 at the north end of the district's contemporary boundaries. Originally named Key Route Heights after the Key Route streetcar system, the neighborhood adopted the Laurel name after the city of Oakland built Laurel Elementary School in 1910.

The prominent Laurel Gateway Arches over MacArthur Blvd at either end of the district were designed and installed in 2006.

MacArthur Blvd., which runs through the Laurel district, was once U.S. Highway 50, before Interstate 580 was built to replace it in the early 1960s. Prior to the construction of the interstate, MacArthur Blvd. had an active night life, with two movie houses in operation: the Hopkins theater at 3259 MacArthur (now a Goodwill), and the Laurel Theater at 3814 MacArthur (demolished in 2017).

Laurel was also home to the Hilltop Tavern, a gathering place for local Native Americans during the middle of the 20th century. In the 1960s, early Bay Area meetings of the American Indian Movement took place here, and the 1969 Occupation of Alcatraz was organized here.

== Education ==
The Oakland Unified School District operates district public schools. Laurel Elementary School is located in Laurel. Residents are also zoned to Bret Harte Middle School and Skyline High School.

At the southeast end of the Laurel neighborhood lies the John Swett School site, now home to The Urban Montessori Charter School. John Swett School, which closed in 2004, is notable as the elementary school alma mater of actor Tom Hanks.

== See also ==
- Dimond District, Oakland
- Maxwell Park, Oakland
- Redwood Heights, Oakland
