= Leimert Bridge =

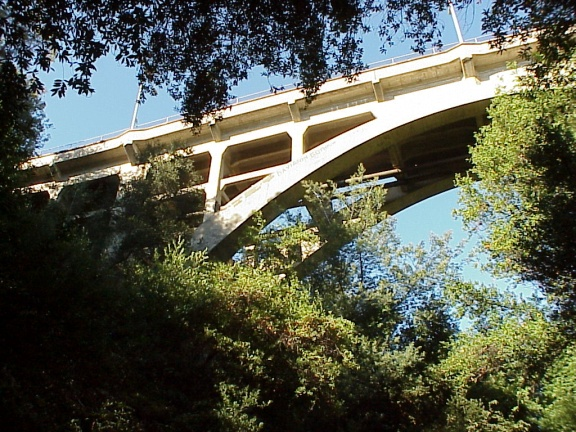
- Coordinates: 37°48′44.22″N 122°12′47.97″W
- Crosses: Sausal Creek
- Locale: Oakland, California

Characteristics
- Design: George Posey
- Material: Cement and steel
- Total length: 357 feet (109 m)
- Height: 117 feet (36 m)
- Longest span: 170 feet (52 m)

History
- Constructed by: Walter H. Leimert
- Opened: 1926

Statistics

Oakland Designated Landmark
- Designated: 1980
- Reference no.: 40

Leimert Bridge is located in the Oakmore neighborhood of Oakland, California. It spans 357 ft (109 m) and is 117 ft (36 m) high above Sausal Creek. It is a cement and steel arch bridge. When it was built in 1926, it was the largest single-span bridge on the West Coast. The 714 ft (218 m) Bixby Creek Bridge with a span of 360 ft (110 m) on the California Big Sur coast opened four years later in 1932.

The bridge was designed by George Posey who also designed the Posey Tube tunnel between Oakland and Alameda.

Realtor Walter H. Leimert built the bridge in order to develop the Oakmore Heights area. The Park Boulevard #18 street car line spurred off the Key System and crossed the bridge connecting Oakmore to central Oakland until the late 1940s; the streetcar power lines were then converted to street lighting.

It became a City of Oakland landmark in 1980.

The multi-use trails of Dimond Canyon travel under the bridge and can be accessed from the Dimond Canyon Trail off El Centro Ave, or Old Cañon Trail off Benevides Ave.
