= Rebecca Kaplan =

American politician (born 1970)

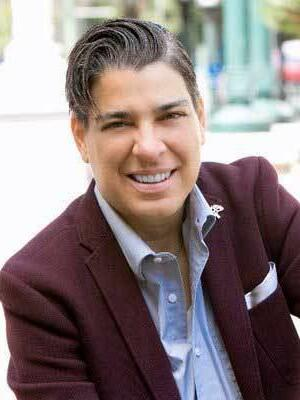

Member of the Oakland City Council
- Interim; January 6, 2025 – April 2025
- Preceded by: Nikki Fortunato Bas
- Succeeded by: Charlene Wang
- Constituency: District 2
- In office January 6, 2009 – January 6, 2025
- Preceded by: Henry Chang, Jr.
- Succeeded by: Rowena Brown
- Constituency: At-large

Vice Mayor of Oakland
- In office January 19, 2021 – January 6, 2025
- Preceded by: Larry Reid

Member of the AC Transit Board of Directors
- In office June 18, 2002 – December 17, 2008
- Preceded by: Matt Williams
- Succeeded by: Joel Young
- Constituency: At-large

Personal details
- Born: Rebecca Dawn Kaplan; September 17, 1970 (age 56) Toronto, Ontario, Canada
- Party: Democratic (since 2008)
- Other political affiliations: Green (until 2008)
- Spouse: Pamela Rosin (m. 2014; div. 2019)
- Education: Massachusetts Institute of Technology (BS); Tufts University (MA); Stanford University (JD)
- Website: Government website

Rebecca Dawn Kaplan (born September 17, 1970) is a Canadian-born American attorney, rabbi and politician who served as an at-large member of the Oakland City Council from 2009 to 2025, and served as interim City Council Member for District 2 from January to April 2025, filling Nikki Fortunato Bas' vacant seat. She is a member of the Democratic Party.

Born in Toronto, Ontario and raised in Hamilton, Ontario, Kaplan has degrees from the Massachusetts Institute of Technology, Tufts University, and Stanford University. She moved to Oakland in the 1990s, where she served as a legislative aide and housing rights attorney. After an unsuccessful run for Oakland City Council in 2000, Kaplan was appointed to and later elected to an at-large seat on the AC Transit Board of Directors in 2002.

Kaplan was elected to an at-large seat on the Oakland City Council in 2008. She was the youngest and first openly LGBTQ+ member of the Oakland City Council. She unsuccessfully ran for mayor in 2010 and 2014 and has served one stint as council president and two stints as vice mayor.

== Early life, education, and career ==
Rebecca Kaplan was born on September 17, 1970, in Toronto, Ontario, Canada. She was raised in Hamilton, Ontario, and attended the Hamilton Hebrew Academy and the Community Hebrew Academy of Toronto. According to Kapalan, her childhood was marked by stories of social justice and workers' rights, which inspired her to pursue a career in public service.

Kaplan moved to the United States in the 1980s to attend college. She has a bachelor of science in psychology from the Massachusetts Institute of Technology, where, as an undergraduate student, she participated in a group that led the school to divest from apartheid in South Africa and adopt sexual non-discrimination policies. She was also awarded an academic honor from Phi Beta Kappa. She later earned a master of arts in urban and environmental policy from Tufts University and a juris doctor from Stanford University.

Kaplan got her start in politics by volunteering on Ted Kennedy's re-election campaign in 1994. After moving to Oakland in the mid-1990s, Kaplan became a legislative aide in the California State Assembly. She later worked for Prisoner Legal Services and practiced law as a housing rights attorney and as a labor attorney with the San Francisco-based firm Altshuler Berzon.

Kaplan unsuccessfully ran for the Oakland City Council in 2000 as a member of the Green Party, but was a Green when elected to the AC Transit Board in 2002 and 2006. She joined the Democratic Party in 2008.

== Political career ==
=== AC Transit Board of Directors ===
Following the resignation of board president Matt Williams in 2002, Kaplan was appointed to his at-large seat on the Alameda-Contra Costa Transit Board of Directors. She served the remainder of Williams' term and was elected to a term in her own right later that year.

As an AC Transit director, Kaplan expanded late-night bus services, improved opportunities for walking and biking, and helped the district bring in its first hydrogen fuel cell buses. She was re-elected in 2006 and resigned in 2008 after being elected to the Oakland City Council.

=== Oakland City Council ===
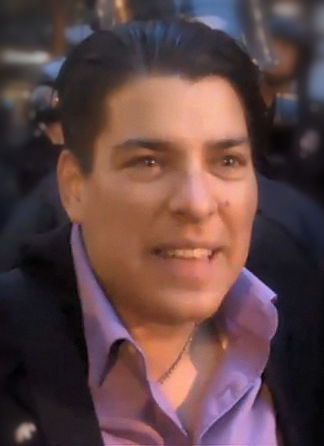
Kaplan in July 2010

Kaplan was elected to an at-large seat on the Oakland City Council in 2008. She was the youngest and first openly LGBTQ+ person elected to public office in Oakland.

Kaplan was unanimously elected to serve as vice mayor in 2021 and currently holds that position. She previously served as council president from 2019 to 2021 and also served a one-year stint as vice mayor from 2015 to 2016.

Kaplan was a candidate for mayor of Oakland in 2010 and 2014, coming in third place and second place, respectively.

==== Budget-balancing measures ====
In 2009, Oakland's budget shortfall ran into the tens of millions, and as a solution, Kaplan proposed Measure F, which raised taxes on medical cannabis businesses. The measure, which dramatically increased taxes on these businesses, was strongly supported by the businesses themselves, and overwhelmingly passed in a special election. Kaplan received national media attention from this initiative, appearing on PBS's NewsHour and Fox Business Network to discuss it. Three other ballot measures, also campaigned for by Kaplan, were passed in a successful effort to balance the year's budget.

==== Vacant building registration ====
In 2009, Kaplan redesigned a failed council measure by Desley Brooks to require owners of certain vacant properties to register their buildings with the city after Oakland's vacancy problem had led to rampant use of empty buildings for illegal activities. Kaplan's version of the measure passed by a wide margin.

==== Cutting ties with ICE ====
In August 2017, two Oakland police officers provided traffic assistance to ICE agents as Homeland Security investigations served a federal search warrant in West Oakland regarding a human trafficking investigation that involves children leading to the detainment of two men, neither ever having been convicted or charged with a crime. Fearing that residents would experience a chilling effect from the incident and would be less willing to call on police for support, Kaplan proposed a resolution upholding the city's sanctuary city status by stipulating that the Oakland Police Department be prevented from colluding and assisting with ICE. The resolution passed unanimously.

==== Vacant parcel tax ====
In 2018, Kaplan championed the vacant parcel tax in Oakland in an effort to resolve Oakland's growing homeless problem. The tax is levied on Oakland's property owners with unused and vacant residential & commercial properties. It took the form of Measure W, which passed on the November ballot.

==== Oakland Athletics ====
In 2019, Kaplan contributed to an effort to sue Alameda County over the approved $85 million sale of the land currently housing the Oakland-Alameda County Coliseum (currently RingCentral Coliseum) and Oakland Arena to the Oakland Athletics. The city argued it was not given a real opportunity to buy the county's share of the land, despite Oakland not having adequate money to purchase the site. The plan the Athletics put forward includes major revitalization projects at both the Howard Terminal and Coliseum sites, including the construction of affordable housing, restaurants, retail, small business space and public gathering spaces.

Due to the abrupt nature of the lawsuit and the fact that the plan was backed by city leaders, Athletics president Dave Kaval said the team was "completely blindsided" and "very disappointed" by the city's lawsuit. Oakland Mayor Libby Schaaf stated, "Our city and county governments should work with each other, not against each other. I hope the council suspends this suit so we can all collaborate together on a beneficial future for the Coliseum." Oakland city councilmember Larry Reid stated that MLB commissioner Rob Manfred told Oakland leaders that "Bay Area fans will soon be going to Las Vegas to see the Raiders and that unless things changed, Bay Area fans may be going to Las Vegas or elsewhere to see the A’s as well."

A few weeks after the lawsuit was filed, Governor Gavin Newsom signed into law two bills, AB1191 and SB293, designed to move the new Howard Terminal ballpark forward.

==== Ethics violation ====
In December 2022, Kaplan was fined $19,000 by the Oakland Public Ethics Commission for an ethics violation of failing to disclose that she owned a property that benefitted from a vote she cast as council member.

=== 2022 Alameda County supervisor election ===
Kaplan was a candidate for the Alameda County Board of Supervisors in the 3rd district. She placed first during the primary and advanced to a runoff with former Alameda vice mayor Lena Tam. In November 2022, Kaplan lost the election to Lena Tam.

== Personal life ==
Kaplan came out at age 16. She is bisexual, a lesbian, and gender nonconforming.

Kaplan married Pamela Rosin in 2014 after two years of dating. The couple separated in 2018 and finalized their divorce in 2019.

Kaplan is Jewish.
