= Redwood Heights, Oakland, California =

Redwood Heights
- Neighborhood of Oakland
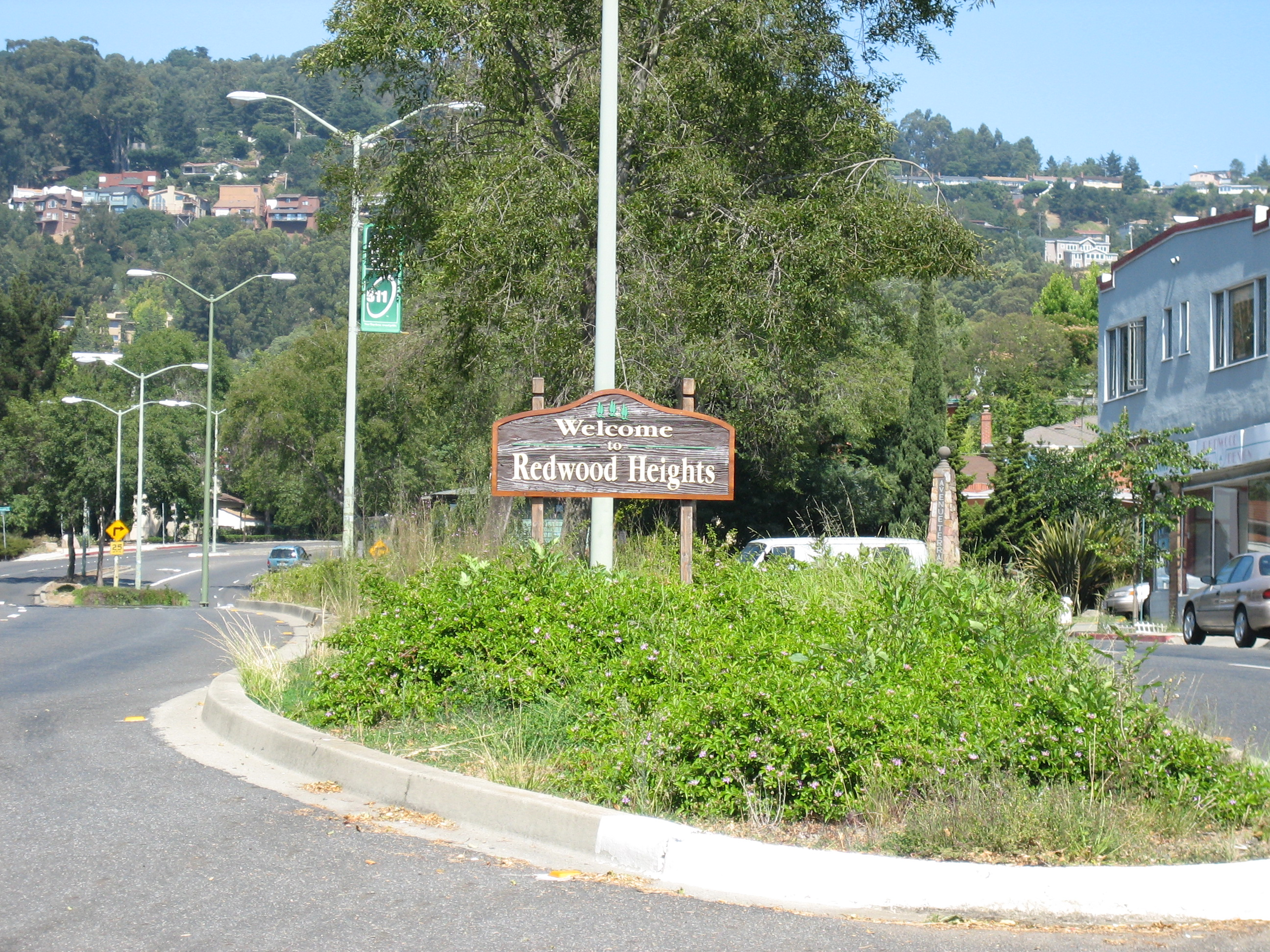
- A sign welcoming motorists to Redwood Heights

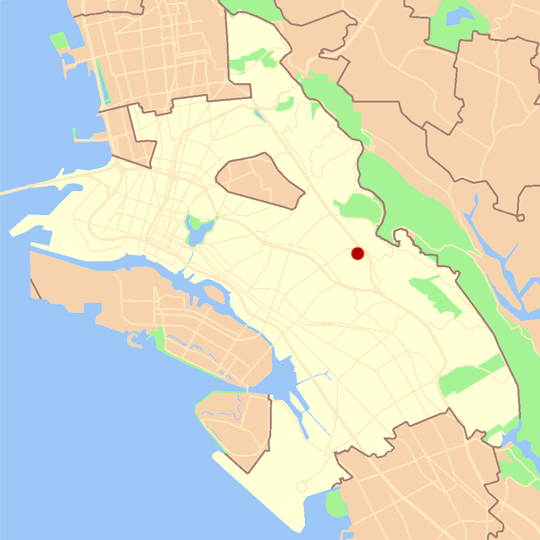
- Location of Redwood Heights in Oakland
- Coordinates: 37.7975°N 122.188333°W
- Country: United States
- State: California
- County: Alameda
- City: Oakland

Redwood Heights is a primarily middle-class and highly diverse residential neighborhood in the hills of East Oakland, California. It is centered on Redwood Road, which was once a logging road. Redwood Road is the designation for 35th Avenue, starting about one mile north of MacArthur Boulevard between Victor Avenue and the Warren Freeway (California State Route 13). It lies at an elevation of 476 feet (145 m).

Redwood Heights Elementary School and the recreation center serve as the heart of the community. The recreation center also serves as an after-school daycare for the school and nearby area. Another feature of the neighborhood is Avenue Terrace Park, also known as Jordan Park, located at Jordan Road and Bennett Place.

The homes in Redwood Heights primarily originated between the 1920s and 1950s, showcasing a wide range of architectural styles. These styles include craftsman, "storybook," and ranch designs.

Redwood Heights has one of Oakland's most ethnically diverse neighborhoods with a primarily middle-class population. The 2010 Census reflects the primary zip code (94619) for the neighborhood as having about 23,200 residents, with Caucasians making up about 29.9% of the population, African Americans 26.2%, Asians 22%, and Latinos 16.1%, with other races forming the remaining 5.8%.

== History ==
=== 1820s ===
Before 1820, the native peoples in the area were probably the Jalquin-Irgen people. A bench in Leona Canyon behind Merritt College acknowledges them and their descendants. These California Native Americans saw themselves inextricably bound to the living world. They were free of such concepts as "land ownership" and "natural resources." What's more, they would have seen a person isolated from the community as having as much meaning as a "finger severed from a hand." The first non-native culture to touch this world were the Spanish-Californios whose vast land grant, Peralta, is the name of the creek that meanders under and through the streets on the west side of Redwood Road.

=== 1840s ===
When the US took California from the Mexicans in the Mexican–American War in 1848, the Peralta family fought in court to keep their lands, represented by a Yankee lawyer who promised to help them.

Meanwhile, more than one hundred men in nine lumber mills logged the giant redwoods above what is now Skyline Boulevard. The majestic redwoods reached so high that they could be seen shipside from the bay. Working by hand, it took two men perched on a board wedged in a notch in the trunk a whole day of hacking away at one giant to send it crashing to the forest floor. One felled ancient - estimated to be over a thousand years old - measured 33.5 feet in diameter. The loggers then stripped the redwood of its branches, prized for its resistance to rot and insects, and split it into boards by drilling holes and stuffing them with dynamite. Teams of oxen lugged the lumber down the roads - including a Redwood Road which was so narrow that many years later, every Sunday, according to one reminiscence, at least one Model T belonging to a picnicker would spin its wheels off the edge.

=== 1860s ===
By 1860, the forest was stripped.

=== 1880s ===
In the 1880s, for a few days, Oakland thought it had the beginning of its own gold rush in what is now the Lincoln Square Shopping Center. But the finding proved to be pyrite or fool's gold.

More valuable to the community, however, was the vision of a writer-poet born Cincinnatus Miller, who renamed himself Joaquin—after Joaquin Murieta, the "Mexican Robin Hood," hero to the Californios and the most famous outlaw of the Gold Rush.

Joaquin Miller, who donned a John Muir-like beard and boots, single-handedly planted on the clear-cut hills 70,000 trees, many of them flammable eucalyptus. He also willed to the public trust after his death his vast land holdings. The park, threaded by walking trails that were probably first cut by loggers and horse ranchers, is a combination of Joaquin Miller's visionary industry. The second growth of the redwood forest, now in about its sixteenth decade, is said to be the oldest second-growth redwood forest in the West.

=== 1900s ===
After the 1906 San Francisco earthquake and fire, the refugees came streaming to our side of the bay—filling the Fruitvale District and venturing up the hill.

=== 1920s ===
The neighborhood known today as Redwood Heights began as a subdivision in the 1920s called Avenue Terrace (the official name of Jordan Park). Oakland's growing downtown middle class was seeking new accommodations, and a 1925 advertisement called the new neighborhood "the Piedmont of East Oakland." The Oakland Tribune of the day extolled its "beautifully wooded hillsides...the pleasure in hiking and riding horseback...excellent climate...and...marine view." A house and the land it stood on sold for about $5,000. Two grocery stores, a hair salon, a drug store, a liquor store, and a shoe repair, served customers at Monterey and Redwood. However, sales literature of the time euphemistically suggested that no one but European-Americans need apply.

There were now streetcar lines and more neighbors. On today's Redwood Heights Elementary School site, Mr. DuBois owned a nursery where he grew cut flowers to sell to local florists.

=== 1930s ===
Developers carved out more plots in the 1930s: the Sunset Manor subdivision on upper 35th and Victor and then Redwood Gardens at Redwood and Detroit. The initial development in the neighborhood was called Avenue Terrace, which can be identified by a notable rock/stone "obelisk" situated at the corner of 35th Ave and Victor. This obelisk likely served as a marker for the Avenue Terrace development.

In the 1930s, some neighborhood residents privately paid to install streets and sidewalks in front of their homes—each homeowner paying about $1,900 over the next ten years.

=== 1940s ===
Several neighbors founded the Redwood Heights Improvement Association in 1944. "Improvement" was a veiled reference to segregation.

=== 1950s ===
Post World War II, from about 1947 to 1964, Americans everywhere turned their tax monies to building highways—including Hwy 13, commissioned in 1947 and named for US Supreme Court Justice Earl Warren, and Hwy 580, completed in the 1960s and named for General Douglas MacArthur.

The removal in the 1950s of Oakland's streetcar lines (known as the Key System), the resulting dominance of car culture, the swiftness of transportation, and the increased density of housing stock have all dramatically changed the ecology and sociology of Redwood Heights.

=== 1960s ===
Not until the powerful civil rights movement of the 1960s did the neighborhood literally open its doors to multiple cultures.

In the early 1960s, Developers completed the Lincoln Square Shopping Center for about $500,000 and the new Holy Names College.

There are several redwood trees on the school premises, and in 1963, one was planted in remembrance of John F Kennedy.

=== 1970s ===
Herb and Ethel Sandal managed the Improvement Association almost single-handedly in the 1970s. They presided over the widening and straightening of Redwood Road—a project meant to deal with the traffic generated by the new housing development in the Crestmont Neighborhood on the west side of Redwood above Highway 13. The Sandals had themselves come of age in an era of open racism (the law against interracial marriage was not rescinded in California until 1949). They sweated through the taking of homes on the west side of Redwood Road through eminent domain. They fought the proposals for putting in their place apartment houses and multi-unit low-income housing—in favor of the small, neatly kept single-family homes which, ironically, for people who believed that "improvement" meant low-ethnic-diversity, immediately welcomed a host of new immigrant families whose contributions have helped make Redwood Heights the culturally intriguing place it is today.

=== 1980s ===
After the 1989 earthquake, the city rebuilt the elementary school to meet the updated safety standards.

Redwood Heights Improvement Association changed its name to the Redwood Heights Neighborhood Association in the 1980s when neighbors changed its purpose to support the elementary school and encourage the socializing that makes for a pleasant and safe way of life.

=== 2010s ===
In 2015, the Redwood Heights Neighborhood Association changed its name to Redwood Heights Association, removing its geographical boundaries to serve as a nonprofit organization for all of Oakland. Its focus is on Bringing People Together, and it is dedicated to substantially improving the quality of life for Oakland residents by hosting community events and spearheading capital improvement projects. Historical articles about the area are available on the Redwood Heights Association website.
