= Libby Schaaf =

American politician (born 1965)

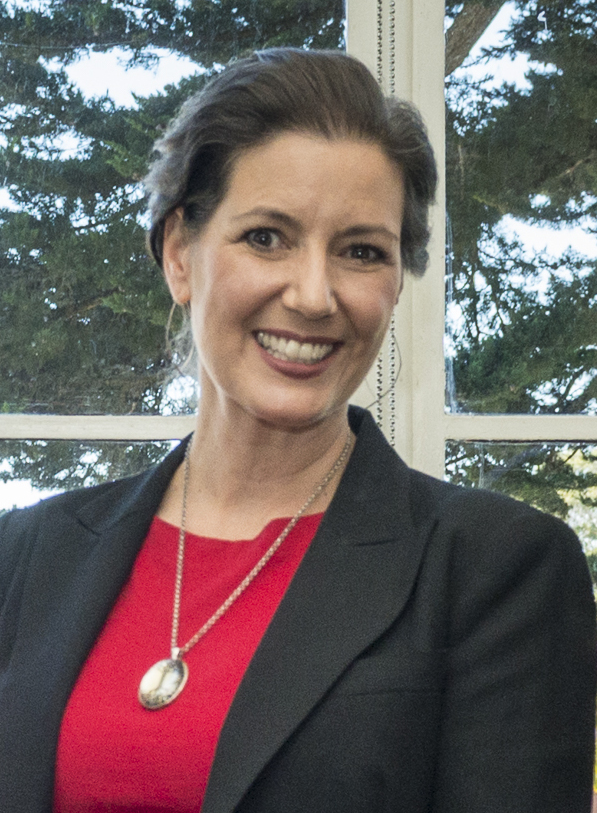
- Schaaf in 2017

50th Mayor of Oakland
- In office January 5, 2015 – January 9, 2023
- Preceded by: Jean Quan
- Succeeded by: Sheng Thao

Member of the Oakland City Council from 4th district
- In office January 2011 – January 2015
- Preceded by: Jean Quan
- Succeeded by: Annie Campbell Washington

Personal details
- Born: Elizabeth Beckman Schaaf; November 12, 1965 (age 60) Oakland, California, U.S.
- Party: Democratic
- Education: Rollins College (BA); Loyola Marymount University (JD)

Elizabeth Beckman Schaaf (born November 12, 1965) is an American politician who served as the 50th Mayor of Oakland, California from 2015 to 2023. A member of the Democratic Party, she previously served on the Oakland City Council.

Schaaf won the November 4, 2014 Oakland mayoral election in the 14th round in ranked choice voting with 62.79% of the vote. She won re-election in 2018 with a 27% margin.

== Early life and education ==
Schaaf was born in Oakland, California, on November 12, 1965. Her mother was a flight attendant. Growing up in Oakland's District 4, Schaaf attended Head-Royce School and Skyline High School, both in Oakland. She holds a B.A. in political science from Rollins College and a J.D. from Loyola Law School.

== Early career ==
Before starting her political career, Schaaf was an attorney in Oakland at the law firm of Reed Smith LLP. She then became the program director for the Marcus A. Foster Educational Institute in 1995, creating and running a new volunteer program for the Oakland Unified School District.

Schaaf's first roles in local government were as legislative aide to Oakland City Council president Ignacio De La Fuente and special assistant to Oakland mayor Jerry Brown.

In 2006, Schaaf joined the Port of Oakland as the Director of Public Affairs, helping to secure state and federal funding for the city of Oakland, as well as directing all strategic communications for the port. In 2009, Schaaf graduated from Emerge California, a training program for women who aspire to elected office.

Before joining the Oakland City Council in 2010, Schaaf served as the Economic Policy Advisor for the council for a year.

== Oakland City Council ==
In 2010, Schaaf was elected to represent her home district, District 4, on the Oakland City Council.

During her tenure on the city council, Schaaf fought to raise the minimum wage, voicing her support for Measure FF, also known as Lift Up Oakland, a $12.25 minimum wage ballot initiative which passed in a landslide on November 4, 2014. Schaaf also strove to increase government transparency and efficiency, build a safer city, and strengthen Oakland neighborhoods in her time on city council. She worked extensively on Oakland Police Department reform, hiring more civilian staff and pushing through a plan to coordinate the Oakland Police Department with the Alameda County Sheriff's Department, to increase the number of officers patrolling Oakland.

== Mayor of Oakland ==
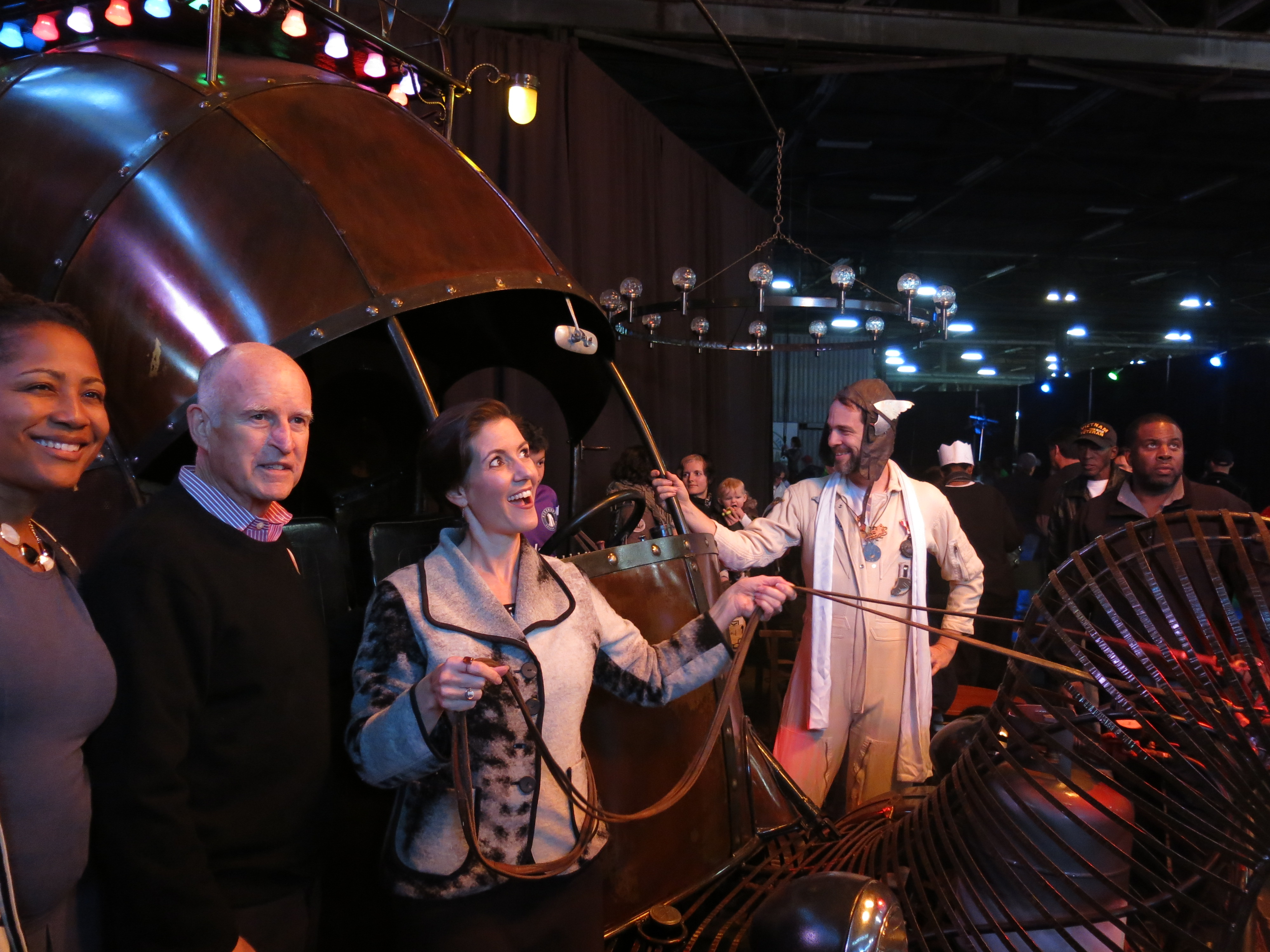
Oakland Mayor Libby Schaaf with California governor Jerry Brown at Schaaf's inaugural celebration (pictured with the art car, the Golden Mean).

In the race for Oakland mayor, Schaaf was endorsed by Governor of California Jerry Brown and US Senator Barbara Boxer. Schaaf triumphed over incumbent mayor Jean Quan and several other candidates in November 2014.

=== Department of Transportation ===
In June 2015, Mayor Schaaf announced the formation of Oakland's first Department of Transportation. The Department of Transportation assumed some responsibilities formerly held by Oakland Public Works, such as road design, resurfacing and maintenance. In her announcement, Mayor Schaaf said that the focus will be on, "sustainable strategies that can bring needed change quickly to city streets."

The Department of Transportation consists of 300 employees, previously working in the Department of Public Works and Oakland Police Department's Parking Enforcement operations.

Funding for the Department of Transportation came from many public resources, including Measure BB, a sales tax approved in November 2014 to fund transportation projects in Alameda County. Schaaf hired Matt Nichols as her Policy Director for Transportation and Infrastructure in March 2015. Jeff Tumlin was named Interim Director of the department in June 2016.

=== Sports teams ===
During her mayoral term, the City of Oakland lost two major sports teams, being the Oakland Raiders in 2020 and the Golden State Warriors in 2019.

=== Controversy over freedom of assembly ===
In May 2015, Mayor Schaaf instituted a ban on un-permitted nighttime marches on public roadways in Oakland, citing existing city policies. The first enforcement of this ban was on May 21, during a #SayHerName march, a nationwide coordinated march focused on ending state violence against black women and girls in the US. Demonstrators met at Frank Ogawa Plaza before sunset for a rally. After the rally, demonstrators began to march onto the street. Police officers told them to keep to the sidewalks, and cited California Vehicle Code Section 2800, making it an arrestable offense not to comply with the police order.

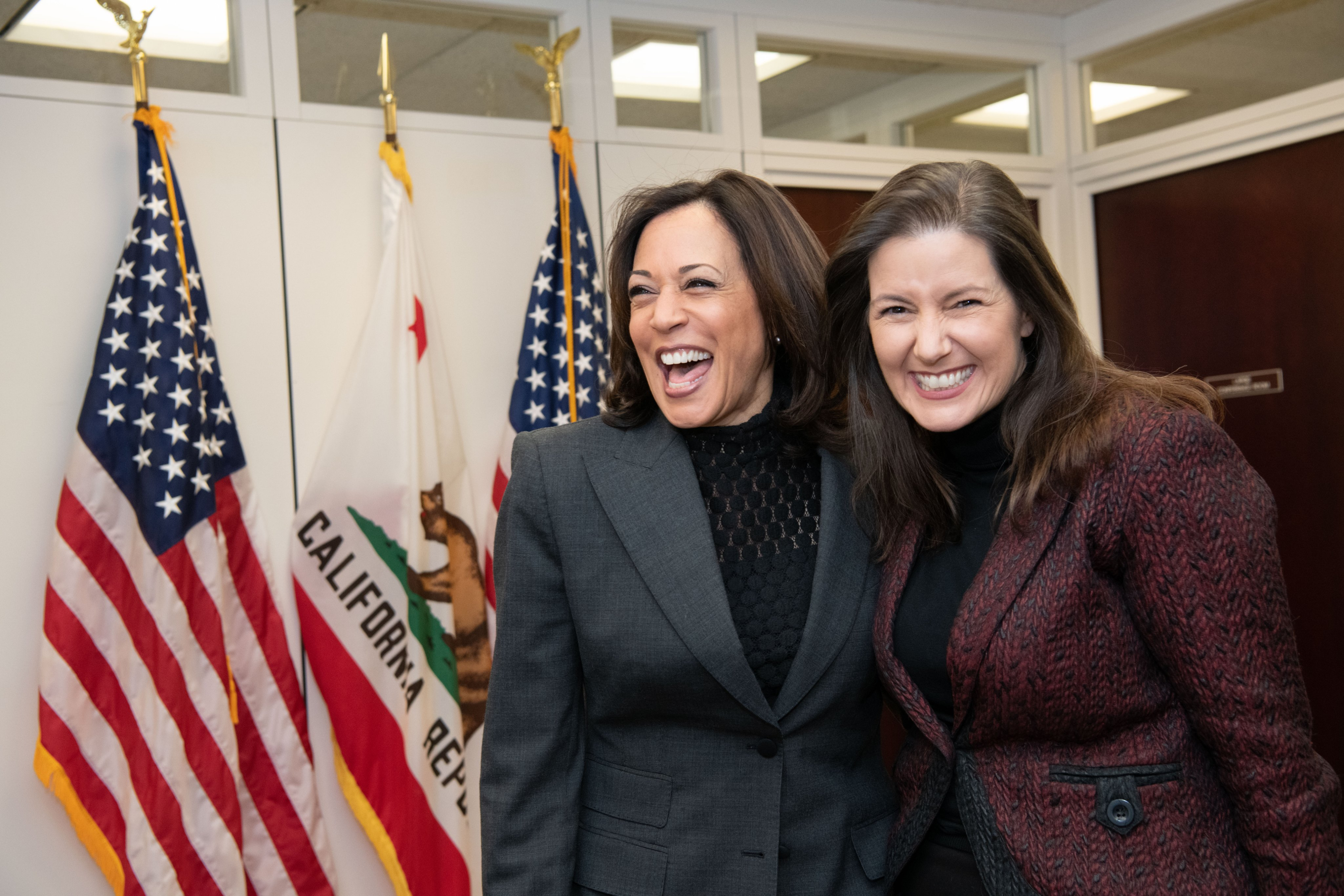
Schaaf with Senator Kamala Harris in 2020

Enactment of this policy brought harsh criticism and allegations of illegality from some constitutional lawyers, including civil rights attorney and one of the co-authors of Oakland Police Department's Crowd Control and Crowd Management Policy, Rachel Lederman: "My general impression is the police took an unduly aggressive approach that not only violated their own crowd control policy, but also the First Amendment... This was an unreasonable interference with the demonstration given that there had been no serious crimes committed." Other legal experts pointed to similar policies in cities like New York, which have been ruled constitutional.

=== ICE alert ===
Schaaf alerted city residents to imminent Immigration and Customs Enforcement (ICE) raids in February 2018, receiving criticism from some federal authorities. She responded, "I was sharing information in a way that was legal and was not obstructing justice, and it was an opportunity to ensure that people were aware of their rights." ICE’s acting director Thomas Homan stated that ICE failed to arrest around 800 people because of the alert.

=== Guaranteed income for minority residents ===
In March 2021, Schaaf announced that 600 selected non-white, low-income families of Oakland would receive $500 per month "guaranteed income" for 18 months. According to the project's website, the income is funded by private philanthropic donations.

=== Allegations of campaign finance violations ===
After she left office, Schaaf was accused of a pattern of campaign finance violations following an investigation by the Oakland Public Ethics Commission. Schaaf and the Commission agreed to a settlement in October 2024.

== Post-mayoral career ==
On January 11, 2024, Schaaf announced a run for California state treasurer in the 2026 election. She suspended her campaign in August 2025 and endorsed Eleni Kounalakis.

In April 2026, the Bay Area Council announced Schaaf would join the regional business association as its next president and CEO effective in May 2026.

== Personal life ==
Schaaf is Jewish. She lives in Oakland with her husband Salvatore Fahey. They have two children, Dominic and Lena.

=== Charitable work ===
Schaaf co-founded the nonprofit Oakland Cares. She also built and ran a centralized volunteer program for Oakland public schools at the Marcus Foster Institute. She has been on the Leadership Council at Kiva, a non-profit organization that allows people to lend money via the Internet to low-income entrepreneurs and students in over 80 countries.

== Electoral history ==
Since 2010, Oakland elections have used ranked choice voting.

=== City Council ===
2010 Oakland City Council district 4 election vote count by round
Candidate	Round 1	Round 2	Round 3	Round 4	Round 5	Round 6
Libby Schaaf	8,756	8,758	8,835	9,001	9,249	10,439
Jill Broadhurst	4,807	4,809	4,878	5,062	5,286	5,828
Melanie Shelby	2,463	2,466	2,552	2,652	3,017	3,404
Daniel Swafford	2,348	2,351	2,444	2,741	2,886	
Clinton Killian	1,138	1,143	1,203	1,273		
Ralph Kanz	883	885	936			
Jason Gillen	530	531				
Write-in	69					
Continuing votes	20,994	20,943	20,848	20,729	20,438	19,671
Exhausted ballots	0	51	145	262	549	1,309
Over Votes	46	46	47	49	53	60
Under Votes	2,844	2,844	2,844	2,844	2,844	2,844
Total	23,884	23,884	23,884	23,884	23,884	23,884

=== Mayoral ===
==== 2018 ====
2018 Oakland mayoral election
Candidate	Votes	%
Libby Schaaf (incumbent)	84,314	53.19
Cat Brooks	40,688	25.67
Pamela Price	20,685	13.05
Saied Karamooz	2,981	1.88
Ken Houston	2,616	1.65
Marchon Tatmon	2,087	1.32
Nancy Sidebotham	1,733	1.09
Peter Yuan Liu	1,156	0.73
Cedric A. Troupe	1,116	0.70
Jesse A.J. Smith	730	0.46
Write-in	415	0.26

== See also ==
- List of mayors of the 50 largest US cities

Political offices
Preceded by Jean Quan	Mayor of Oakland; 2015–2023	Succeeded by Sheng Thao
