= Cypress Village, Oakland, California =

Public housing development in Oakland, California, United States

Coordinates: 37.80893°N 122.29075°W

The Cypress Village housing projects (officially named Peralta Villa Public Housing Community) are a series of housing complexes stretching from 10th Street to 14th Street and Kirkham Way. Cypress is located in between the Acorn neighborhood and Lower Bottoms neighborhood in West Oakland. Cypress Village is one of the three housing projects in West Oakland, along with the Campbell Village Court and the Acorn Projects.

Cypress Village was built by the Oakland Housing Authority after World War II, when many African Americans began to migrate to Oakland. It was one of four all-black segregated projects built at the time. After the Cypress Freeway was built in 1954-1957 immediately in front of the project, most whites and middle-class blacks left the neighborhood to avoid the noise and pollution. By the 1980s Cypress Village was a "drug supermarket" where Huey P. Newton purchased drugs. The neighborhood suffered further disruption in 1989 when the freeway collapsed in the Loma Prieta earthquake. However, at the city of Oakland's insistence, the State of California rebuilt the freeway to avoid the neighborhood and instead cleaned up contamination on its property and, fifteen years later, completed a boulevard on the site named the Mandela Parkway, with a landscaped park in the median. Cypress Village is the home of rapper J Stalin of the Livewire record label.

Due to close proximity, skirmishes between Cypress Village and neighboring Acorn as well as Lower Bottoms occur frequently. In order to reduce the violence between the two housing projects, in 2003 rappers from both Acorn and Cypress released an underground mixtape titled Acorn & Cypress inspired by other unity rap albums like the Bloods and Crips Bangin' on Wax releases. Since then, West Oakland based rap label Livewire Records founded by J Stalin (who originates from Cypress Village) has signed numerous rappers from both housing units including Acorn resident Shady Nate.
