= Acorn, Oakland, California =

Housing development in Oakland, California, United States

Coordinates: 37.80202°N 122.28659°W

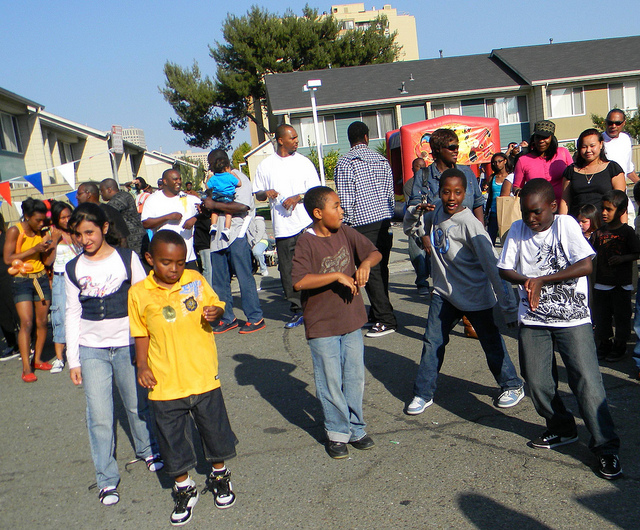
Acorn Oakland block party

Acorn or Acorn Projects are a series of housing projects in the Acorn Redevelopment Project Area or the Acorn neighborhood of West Oakland. Acorn, also known as "The Corns" or the "Cornfields", neighbors a wide variety of public housing. It is bordered by the high rise City Towers Apartments and low rise Mohr Apartments to the South, Cypress Village to the West, Market Street to the east and 10th Street to the north.

Originally consisting of three housing units, Acorn 1, Acorn 2 and Acorn 3, The City of Oakland Housing Authority renovated the entire Acorn housing complex during the late 1990s in efforts to combat crime. Acorn 1 and Acorn 2 were renamed "Town Center Apartments at Acorn" and "Courtyard Apartments at Acorn". Meanwhile, Acorn 3 was completely demolished and is now represented by 3rd Acorn llc founded by one of the former residents TVon Trapper also known as Mac Mou! (Monitizing All Conversation Motivation Over Undertaking). A small community of two-story single-family houses between Filbert and Market Streets were built in its place.

Adjacent to Acorn, there are three high-rise buildings known as the City Towers (formally named Apollo Housing) that resemble the high-rises of Chicago and New York City. Technically, City Towers (or "The Highrises" as they are known to locals) are a separate community of housing projects however, during the renovation of Acorn in the 1990s, many of the original residents of Acorn were relocated to City Towers. As a result, City Towers are considered by Acorn residents and the Bay Area as being part of the same public housing units as Acorn.

Acorn is home to the Acorn Mob. Due to close proximity, skirmishes between Acorn and neighboring Cypress Village as well as Lower Bottoms occurred frequently. In order to reduce the violence between the two housing projects, in 2003 local rappers from both Acorn and Cypress released an underground mixtape titled Acorn & Cypress inspired by other unity rap albums like the Bloods and Crips Bangin' on Wax releases. Since then, West Oakland based rap label Livewire Records founded by J Stalin (who originates from Cypress Village) has signed numerous rappers from both housing units, including Acorn native Shady Nate.

In 2014, the housing project was featured in season 5, episode 2 of the National Geographic Channel television show Drugs, Inc. A segment of the episode titled "Cokeland", was filmed in and around the Acorn and City Towers housing complexes.
