= Cornelius "Cornbread" Givens =

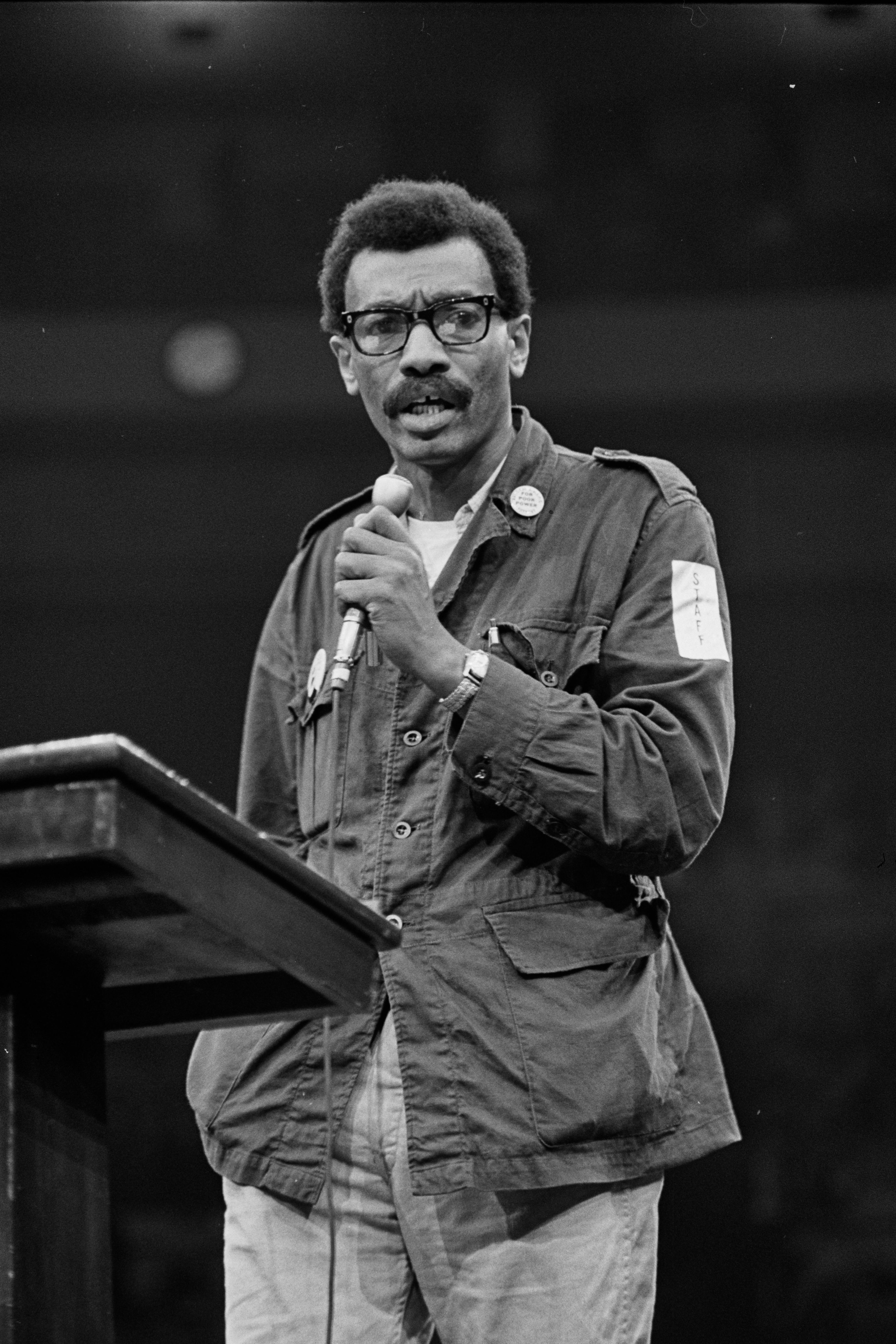
Givens at a rally for Eugene McCarthy at Madison Square Garden, May 19, 1968

Cornelius "Cornbread" Givens (1931–2008), usually known as Cornbread Givens, was a civil rights leader and a national advocate for cooperatives. He was also known as the first African American to run for mayor of a major US city, Jersey City, New Jersey.

== Early life ==
In 1931, Givens was born in Jersey City. From 15 to 18 years old, he was stationed in the South Pacific. In 1952, he and Alma Montgomery married. They had two children, Kevin and Pamela. During the early 1960s, Givens owned his own home remodeling business.

== Career ==
In 1961, Givens began his political career in the New Frontier Political Democratic Club, which began running African American political candidates. By 1963, Givens was president of the club and promised to run an African American for mayor of Jersey City in two years. In 1965, Givens ran for mayor of Jersey City. His campaign platform included federally-financed factories run by African Americans, history books reflecting a more accurate understanding of African American contributions, funds to rehabilitate neighborhoods and build middle-class cooperatives, and rent control. He came in sixth out of seven contenders.

Givens committed his life to building anti-poverty organizations run by poor people like himself. He said, "One day when I was 13, I grew so sick of poverty that I cried. I vowed then the next generation would not endure what I had to suffer." From 1964, he worked for CAN DO, an anti-poverty organization that trained teenage boys to do construction. Then, he formed Poverty Organization of Rehabilitation (POOR) and Grass Rooters Interested in Poverty Elimination (GRIPE).

Givens became a leader in the Poor People's Campaign. Mayor John Lindsey appointed Givens New York coordinator of the campaign. During Resurrection City, a multiracial group, including Givens, decided that America's poor needed its own “embassy,” a Poor People's Embassy in Washington, DC. From this embassy, Givens launched the Poor People's Development Foundation (PPDF), which sought to help poor communities develop cooperatives. From 1969, Givens was the president and the board included Chicano activist Reies Tijerina, native activist Tillie Walker, and Black Panther Mark Comfort. By 1971, PPDF worked on establishing farm cooperatives in the South and linking them to northern consumers, as well as supporting community control of urban renewal efforts in Chicago. The farm cooperatives formed in response to the backlash against the Voting Rights Act of 1965. Southern tenant farmers who decided to register to vote were, in retaliation, evicted from their tenant farms. Givens and PPDF worked to connect Southern farmers' cooperatives with consumer food cooperatives, farmers' markets, health food stores, and collective warehouses, which he set up around Newark, NJ and New York City. Members of the PPDF trucked food up to Newark and New York City to be sold in farmers' markets and health food stores.

When Mayor Marion Barry was elected as mayor of Washington, DC, Givens moved to Washington, DC. By May 1980, Barry made Givens chairperson of his new Commission on Cooperative Economic Development, which aimed to make Washington, DC, a demonstration city for cooperative development. Givens envisioned cooperatives as a way to forge economic and political power among low- and moderate-income residents. Givens created an entire development model in which each community would have: 1) producer cooperatives (particularly important for job creation, 2) consumer cooperatives, 3) credit unions, 4) low-income housing cooperatives, and 5) a community cooperative funded by profits from the other cooperatives to develop social programs like schools, hospitals, and child development centers. He understood these cooperatives as necessarily working together. This model would also require assistance at the national level, such as from the National Cooperative Bank, which he helped form.

In 1985, Givens told FBI agents about phony contracts that DC government employee Ivanhoe Donaldson had run through Givens' organization. Donaldson eventually was sentenced to seven years for his embezzlement and fined. Givens was never charged with any wrongdoing.

Givens spent the rest of his life advocating for cooperatives. DC Mayor Sharon Pratt Dixon helped Givens establish the University of the District of Columbia's Center for Cooperatives.
