= Mandela Partners =

Nonprofit organization in California, U.S.

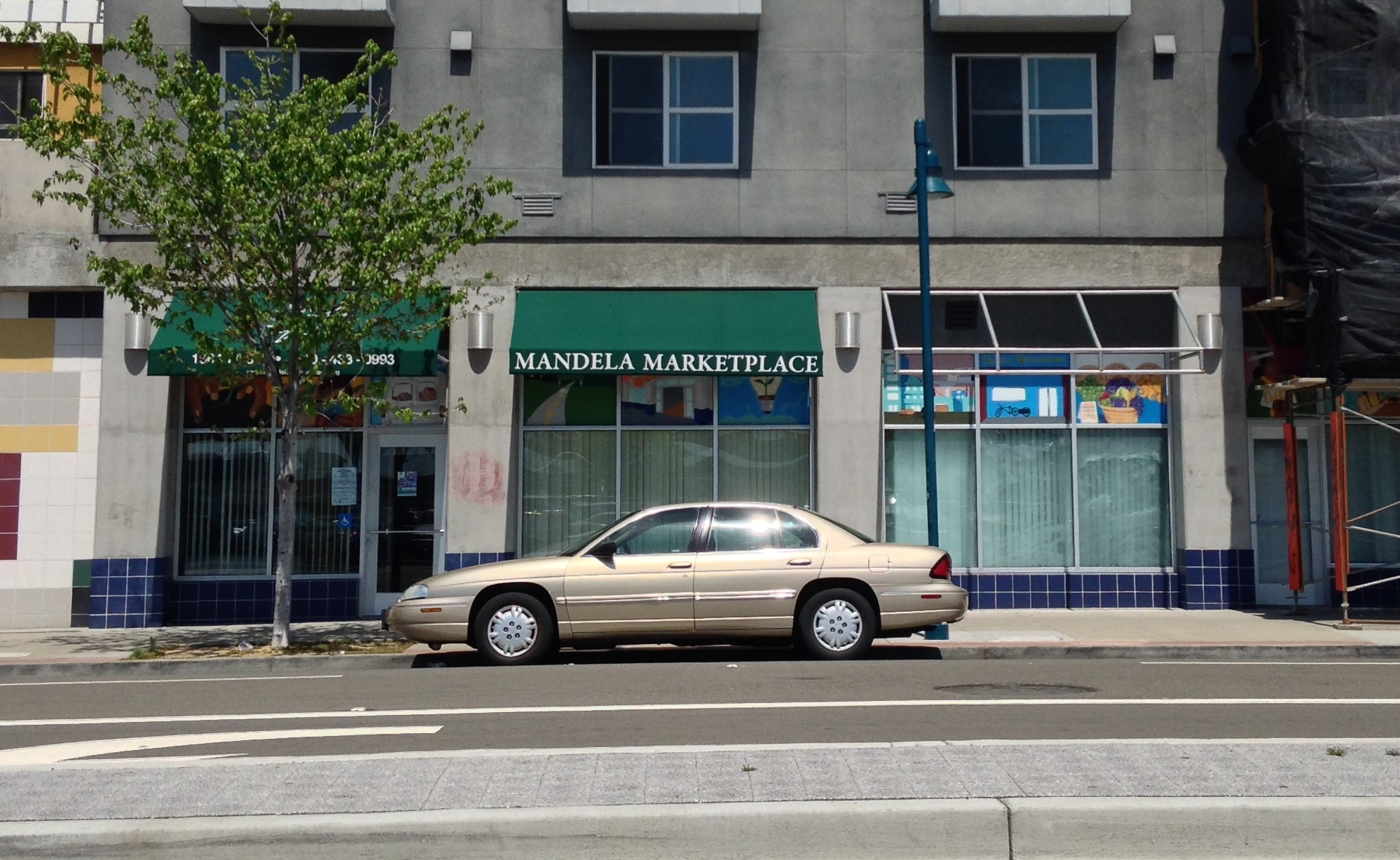
Mandela Partners headquarters in West Oakland

Mandela Partners, formerly Mandela MarketPlace, is a non-profit organization in Oakland, California, that works to aid low-income communities in improving access to food and healthcare resources.

== Past projects ==
From 2007 to 2013, Mandela Partners sustained the West Oakland Youth Standing Empowered (WYSE) youth development program. The WYSE program focused on educating West Oakland's youth on the social justice impacts of food and health. WYSE's initiatives included improving the walkability of West Oakland, bettering the public transit infrastructure, cleaning and improving local parks, and starting an elementary school garden.

Mandela Partners also implemented the Food to Families (F2F) program, which "[provided] health & wellness workshops, cooking demos, and group experiences for community families." F2F primarily worked with pregnant women and their families by educating them on how eating healthier and more nutritious food would improve their health and the health of their communities. F2F also worked to establish a network that would sustain the goals of the program past its own existence. This network created a cookbook written by "senior moms", Mommas Kitchen Stove.

== Food cooperative ==
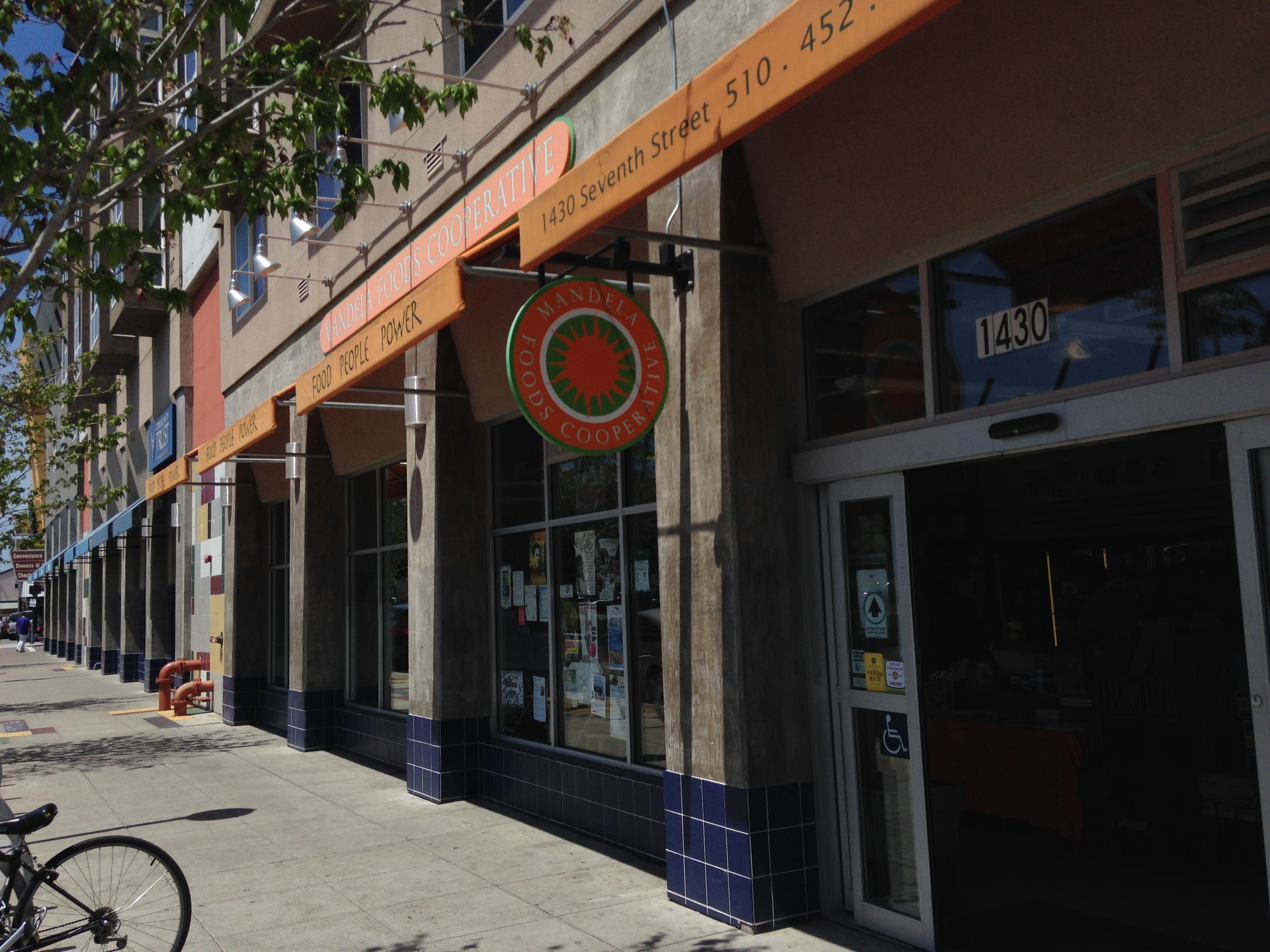
Mandela Foods Cooperative entrance

In 2008, Mandela Partners opened The Mandela Grocery Cooperative, a worker owned grocery store and nutrition education center. The inception of the co-op was in response to requests made to Mandela Partners by residents of West Oakland. The Mandela Grocery Cooperative holds classes focused on nutrition and is centrally located two blocks from the West Oakland BART station making it accessible to both West Oakland residents and other residents of the San Francisco Bay Area.

The co-op "sources their produce from small to medium sized local farms within a 120-mile radius from Oakland." The Mandela Grocery Cooperative helps "under-resourced farmers by establishing an alternative distribution network that passes on wholesale prices to community retailers and institutions." The co-op has received the below awards for their achievements in the Food Justice Movement.

- 2012: San Francisco Bay Guardian Small Business Award - Employee Owned Business
- 2011: Oakland Indie Award -The Ripple Effect
- 2011: Ella Baker Center - Ella Award
- 2010: Robert Redford Art of Activism Award - James Berk, Mandela Foods Cooperative Worker-Owner

Mandela Grocery Cooperative is a member of the Network of Bay Area Worker Cooperatives.

== Financing ==
Mandela Partners partnered with Kiva to offer a ladder-up microfinance initiative. The organization endorses West Oakland residents for access to micro loans of up to $25,000. "As a community resource, [Mandela Partners] also [provides] one-on-one support to local entrepreneurs that are eligible for loans and connect them to [their] resource network to help them build their businesses."

== Current projects ==
Mandela Partners aims to build local economies, increase food access, and support family farmers and a healthier community. The organization has started several projects such as Healthy Neighborhood Store Alliance (HNSA) which promotes West Oakland residents’ rights to access healthy and affordable food. Mandela Partners provides delivery service to some of the community's well-known corner stores and offers nutrition education and improvements at each store. The organization also manages weekly events for residents to purchase fresh produce.

Mandela Partners participates in the Ashland Cherryland Initiative. The organization has coordinated with several community programs in Ashland, California, and Cherryland, California, to create the Ashland Cherryland Food Policy Council, which provides advice to local government on policies that produce greener environments.
