= Poor People's Campaign =

1968 US anti-poverty campaign

- Part of the civil rights movement
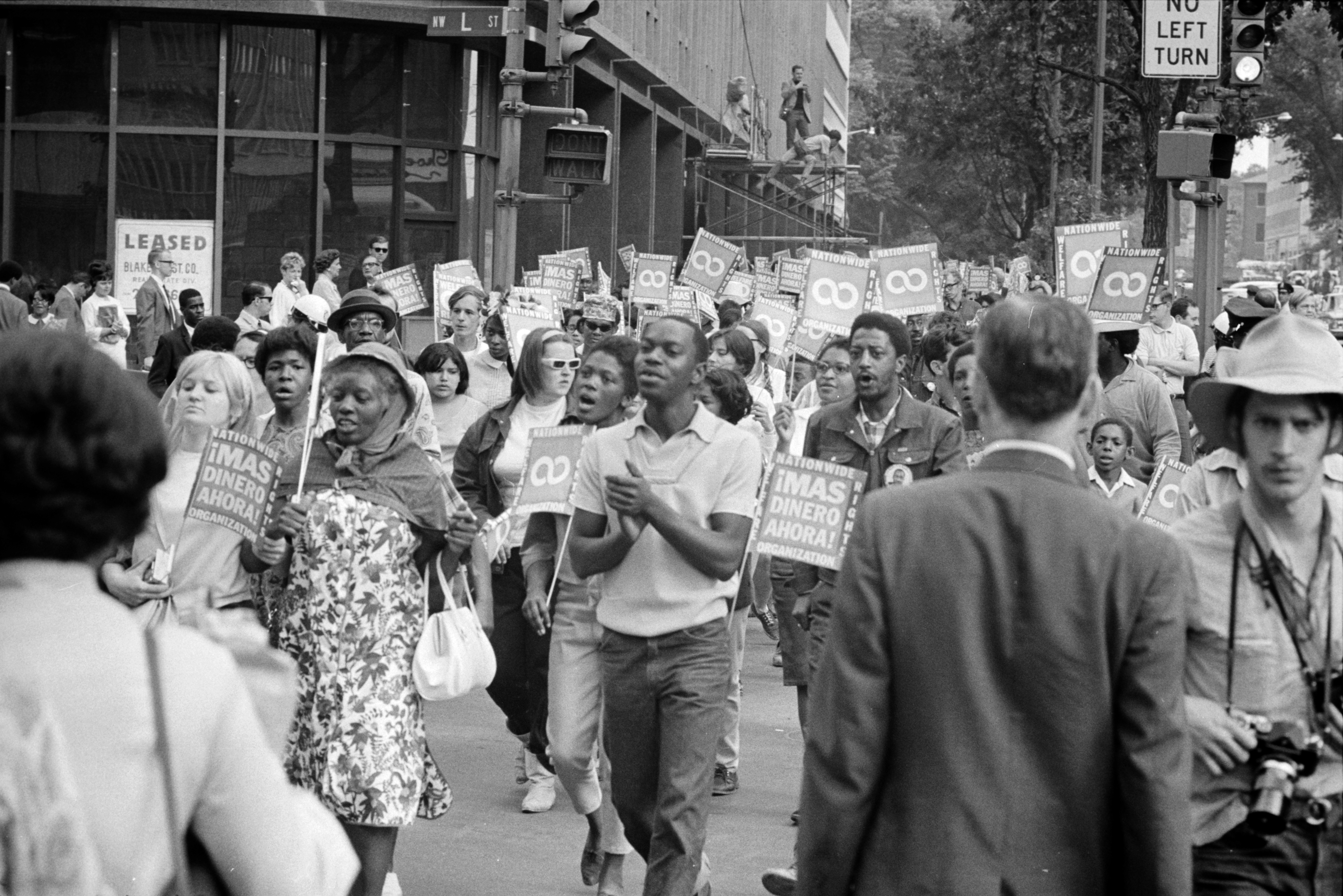
- Demonstrators in the Poor People's March at Lafayette Park and Connecticut Avenue in Washington, D.C. in June 1968
- Date: May 12 – June 24, 1968
- Location: Washington, D.C.
- Result: See Aftermath and impact

Parties
Southern Christian Leadership Conference (SCLC); The Committee of 100	Federal Bureau of Investigation (FBI)

Lead figures
SCLC members: Martin Luther King Jr. X; Ralph Abernathy; A. D. King	J. Edgar Hoover

The Poor People's Campaign, or Poor People's March on Washington, was a 1968 effort to gain economic justice for poor people in the United States. It was organized by Martin Luther King Jr. and the Southern Christian Leadership Conference (SCLC), and carried out under the leadership of Ralph Abernathy in the wake of King's assassination in April 1968.

The campaign demanded economic and human rights for poor Americans of diverse backgrounds. After presenting an organized set of demands to Congress and executive agencies, participants set up a 3,000-person protest camp on the Washington Mall, where they stayed for six weeks in the spring of 1968.

The Poor People's Campaign was motivated by a desire for economic justice: the idea that all people should have what they need to live. King and the SCLC shifted their focus to these issues after observing that gains in civil rights had not improved the material conditions of life for many African Americans. The Poor People's Campaign was a multiracial effort—including African Americans, Non-Hispanic White Americans, Asian Americans, Hispanic Americans, and Native Americans—aimed at alleviating poverty regardless of race.

According to political historians such as Barbara Cruikshank, "the poor" did not particularly conceive of themselves as a unified group until President Lyndon Johnson's War on Poverty (declared in 1964) identified them as such. Figures from the 1960 census, Bureau of Labor Statistics, U.S. Commerce Department, and the Federal Reserve estimated anywhere from 40 to 60 million Americans—or 22 to 33 percent—lived below the poverty line. At the same time, the nature of poverty itself was changing as America's population increasingly lived in cities, not farms (and could not grow its own food).

By 1968, the War on Poverty seemed like a failure, neglected by a Johnson administration (and Congress) that wanted to focus on the Vietnam War and increasingly saw anti-poverty programs as primarily helping African Americans. The Poor People's Campaign sought to address poverty through income and housing. The campaign would help the poor by dramatizing their needs, uniting all races under the commonality of hardship and presenting a plan to start to a solution. Under the "economic bill of rights," the Poor People's Campaign asked for the federal government to prioritize helping the poor with a $30 billion anti-poverty package that included, among other demands, a commitment to full employment, a guaranteed annual income measure and more low-income housing. The Poor People's Campaign was part of the second phase of the civil rights movement. King said, "We believe the highest patriotism demands the ending of the war and the opening of a bloodless war to final victory over racism and poverty".

King wanted to bring poor people to Washington, D.C., forcing politicians to see them and think about their needs: "We ought to come in mule carts, in old trucks, any kind of transportation people can get their hands on. People ought to come to Washington, sit down if necessary in the middle of the street and say, 'We are here; we are poor; we don't have any money; you have made us this way ... and we've come to stay until you do something about it.'"

== Development ==
=== Idea ===
The Poor People's Campaign had complex origins. King considered bringing poor people to the nation's capital since at least October 1966, when welfare rights activists held a one-day march on the Mall. In May 1967 during a SCLC retreat in Frogmore, South Carolina, King told his aides that the SCLC would have to raise nonviolence to a new level to pressure Congress into passing an Economic Bill of Rights for the nation's poor. The SCLC resolved to expand its civil rights struggle to include demands for economic justice and to challenge the Vietnam War. In his concluding address to the conference, King announced a shift from "reform" to "revolution" and stated: "We have moved from the era of civil rights to an era of human rights."

In response to the anger that led to riots in 1967 in Newark (July 12–17) and Detroit (July 23–28), King and his close confidante, Stanley Levison, wrote a report in August (titled "The Crisis in America's Cities") which called for disciplined urban disruption, particularly in Washington:

"To dislocate the functioning of a city without destroying it can be more effective than a riot because it can be longer-lasting, costly to society but not wantonly destructive. Moreover, it is more difficult for government to quell it by superior force. Mass civil disobedience can use rage as a constructive and creative force. It is purposeless to tell Negroes they should not be enraged when they should be. Indeed, they will be mentally healthier if they do not suppress rage but vent it constructively and use its energy peacefully but forcefully to cripple the operations of an oppressive society. Civil disobedience can utilize the militancy wasted in riots to seize clothes or groceries many did not even want.

Civil disobedience has never been used on a mass scale in the North. It has rarely been seriously organized and resolutely pursued. Too often in the past was it employed incorrectly. It was resorted to only when there was an absence of mass support and its purpose was headline-hunting. The exceptions were the massive school boycotts by Northern Negroes. They shook educational systems to their roots but they lasted only single days and were never repeated.

If they are developed as weekly events at the same time that mass sit-ins are developed inside and at the gates of factories for jobs, and if simultaneously thousands of unemployed youth camp in Washington, as the Bonus Marchers did in the thirties, with these and other practices, without burning a match or firing a gun, the impact of the movement will have earthquake proportions. (In the Bonus Marches, it was the government that burned down the marchers' shelters when it became confounded by peaceful civil disobedience).

This is not an easy program to implement. Riots are easier just because they need no organization. To have effect we will have to develop mass disciplined forces that can remain excited and determined without dramatic conflagrations.

Also in August, Senator Robert F. Kennedy asked Marian Wright Edelman "to tell Dr. King to bring the poor people to Washington to make hunger and poverty visible since the country's attention had turned to the Vietnam War and put poverty and hunger on the back burner." At another SCLC retreat in September, Edelman transmitted Kennedy's message to King and suggested that King and a handful of poor people hold a sit-in at the Department of Agriculture. Stanley Levison proposed an even more ambitious crusade that modeled itself on the Bonus Army of 1932.

=== Planning ===
The SCLC's major planning before announcing the campaign took place during a five-day meeting (November 27 – December 1, 1967) in Frogmore, SC. With King's leadership, the group agreed to organize a civil disobedience campaign in Washington, D.C., focused on jobs and income. King wanted the demonstration to be "nonviolent, but militant, and as dramatic, as dislocative, as disruptive, as attention-getting as the riots without destroying property".

Not all members of the SCLC agreed with the idea of occupying Washington. Bayard Rustin opposed civil disobedience. Other members of the group (like Jesse Jackson) wanted to pursue other priorities. Dissent continued throughout the planning of the campaign.

King traveled to Washington in February 1968 in order to meet with local activists and prepare the resources necessary to support the campaign.

Marchers were scheduled to arrive in Washington on May 2. Some planners wanted to target specific politicians; others wanted to avoid "begging" and focus on movement-building and mutual education.

=== Publicity ===
The SCLC announced the campaign on December 4, 1967. King delivered a speech which identified "a kind of social insanity which could lead to national ruin." In January 1968, the SCLC created and distributed an "Economic Fact Sheet" with statistics explaining why the campaign was necessary. King avoided providing specific details about the campaign and attempted to redirect media attention to the values at stake. The Poor People's Campaign held firm to the movement's commitment to non-violence. "We are custodians of the philosophy of non-violence," said King at a press conference. "And it has worked."

In February 1968, King announced specific demands: $30 billion for antipoverty, full employment, guaranteed income, and the annual construction of 500,000 affordable residences.

The media often discouraged those within the movement who were committed to non-violence. Instead of focusing on issues of urban inequality and the interracial efforts concerted to address them, the media concentrated on specific incidents of violence, leadership conflicts and protest tactics.

King toured a number of cities to raise support for the campaign. King's visits were carefully orchestrated and the media tightly controlled; meetings with militant Black leaders were held behind closed doors. On March 18, 1968, he visited the town of Marks, Mississippi. He watched a teacher feeding schoolchildren their lunch, consisting only of a slice of apple and some crackers, and was moved to tears. A few days after the visit, he spoke at the National Cathedral in Washington, D.C.: "We're coming to Washington in a poor people's campaign. I was in Marks, Miss., the other day, which is in Quitman County, the poorest county in the United States. And I tell you I saw hundreds of black boys and black girls walking the streets with no shoes to wear." He decided he wanted the Poor People's Campaign to start in Marks because of the intense and visible economic disparity he'd seen there.

== Members and friends ==
=== Leaders ===
- Martin Luther King Jr. was the campaign's leader until his assassination on April 4, 1968.
- Rev. James Bevel was a key advisor and strategic partner to King who initiated and organized many SCLC campaigns, including the 1963 Birmingham Children's Crusade and the 1965 Selma to Montgomery marches.
- Ralph Abernathy succeeded to the SCLC presidency and led the campaign after King's assassination.
- Stanley Levison was a key advisor to King whose influence diminished after the assassination.
- Bernard Lafayette was the national coordinator of the campaign.
- Rodolfo "Corky" Gonzales, a prominent Chicano movement advocate, led a caravan from Colorado.
- Cornelius "Cornbread" Givens, New York coordinator and co-organizer of the Poor People's Embassy.
- Reies Tijerina, of New Mexico, was a leader of land grant rights efforts in the Chicano movement.
- Stoney Cooks did outreach and recruitment to college students.
- Hosea Williams of the Georgia SCLC was the campaign's field director and became a director of logistics at Resurrection City.
- Rev. Fred C. Bennette was a liaison to the clergy.
- SCLC Vice President Andrew Young was a major leader and spokesperson.
- Walter Fauntroy was the Washington coordinator for the SCLC, and became director of what remained of the campaign in 1969.
- Rev. Dr. David Carter was the Assistant Director for Mobilization.
- Rev. Jesse Jackson would be "elected" mayor of the Resurrection City encampment on the Washington Mall.

=== Recruitment ===
The SCLC recruited marshals, who came to a training workshop in Atlanta in March then returned home to recruit participants, raise funds, and solicit organizational support. Participants were required to sign an agreement to use non-violence and to obey the marshals.

Reactions to the campaign were mixed, and some were outright hostile based on their perceptions of King and the SCLC. Leaders and recruiters had to construct their images carefully in order to appeal to potential marchers across lines of wealth and denomination—they de-emphasized their middle-class status, wearing denim instead of suits. They faced the delicate challenge of simultaneously appealing to radicals and moderates (including campus liberals).

=== Marchers ===
Campaign leaders recruited across the country, first in the East and South, and then increasingly westward, reaching poor people in Texas and the Southwest, as well as California and the West Coast. People of all walks of life came from across the nation. Many volunteers were women and many had been involved in other civil rights protests. People commenting on their reasons for participation explained that they wanted to participate in the decisions that affected their lives, and to explain how federal programs, intended to help them, sometimes left them behind completely. They stressed that they were deprived of their basic human rights, and they wanted to make their situations known in the nation's capital. Most did not own their homes or have basic utilities where they lived. Many did not receive federal benefits of any sort.

=== Minority Group Conference ===
In one of the campaign's more important recruitment efforts, SCLC hosted about 80 representatives of other poor, often minority groups in Atlanta, with whom the civil rights organization had had little to no relationship up to that point. On March 14, 1968, delegates attended the so-called "Minority Group Conference" and discussed the upcoming campaign and whether or not their specific issues would be considered. Among the delegates were Chicano Movement leaders Reies Tijerina, Corky Gonzales, José Ángel Gutiérrez, and Bert Corona; white coal miners from Kentucky and West Virginia; Native American and Puerto Rican activists; and Myles Horton, organizer and founder of the Highlander Folk School. With a skeptical and fast-weakened Cesar Chavez occupied by a farm workers' hunger strike, Reies Tijerina was the most prominent Chicano leader present. At the end of a long day, most delegates decided to participate in the campaign, convinced that specific demands that often revolved around land and treaty rights would be honored by campaign organizers.

=== Endorsements ===
The National Welfare Rights Organization and the American Friends Service Committee were key partners in the campaign's organizing, including developing demands, fundraising, and recruitment.

The American Federation of Teachers promised to set up "freedom schools" for children in the camps; the National Association of Social Workers also said it would help with child care. The Youth International Party held its own rallies in support. The campaign received an endorsement from the YMCA.

Volunteer advocates from the Peace Corps and VISTA formed a speakers bureau, which helped publicize the campaign and educate outsiders.

Organizers already in D.C. were enthusiastic about the campaign, and by March 1968 over 75 people were meeting in committees to prepare for the incoming marchers. The campaign was endorsed by a variety of local organizations, especially religious congregations.

The campaign received a limited endorsement and financial support from SNCC, the Student Nonviolent Coordinating Committee. SNCC (soon to change its name to the Student National Coordinating Committee) announced that it would not march with the Poor People's Campaign in D.C. because it did not believe in strict adherence to nonviolence. SCLC also reported receiving major financial support for the march from middle-class whites. The Steering Committee Against Repression (SCAR)—which included members from SNCC as well as from a variety of other groups—also gave a partial endorsement, urging the SCLC to focus the campaign on state repression, surveillance, persecution, and political prisoners.

The campaign had support from within the organized labor movement, including endorsements by The Daily Worker, United Steelworkers, and Walter Reuther. However, the official leadership of the AFL–CIO—particularly President George Meany—would not endorse the campaign because of disagreement over the Vietnam War.

== Government reaction and preparations ==
The prospect of an occupation of Washington by thousands of poor people triggered fears of rioting.

=== Johnson administration ===
The Johnson administration prepared for the campaign as though it might attempt a violent takeover of the nation's capital.

=== Congress ===
Some members of Congress were outspoken about their fear of the campaign. Democratic Senator Russell B. Long called for the censure of congresspeople whom he accused of "bending the knee" to the campaign, also saying: "When that bunch of marchers comes here, they can just burn the whole place down and we can just move the capital to some place where they enforce the law." Another Democratic Senator, John L. McClellan, accused the SCLC of attempting to start a riot, and decried a recent court decision that he said would allow marchers "to go to Washington one night and get on welfare the next day", rendering D.C. a "Mecca for migrants".

=== Richard Nixon ===
Richard Nixon, campaigning for the 1968 presidential election, asked Congress not to capitulate to the campaigners' demands.

=== Military preparations ===
20,000 army soldiers were activated and prepared for a military occupation of the capital should the Poor People's Campaign pose a threat.

=== Operation POCAM ===
Documents obtained through the Freedom of Information Act show how the FBI seeded a news story about jealousy and resentment between the Poor People's Campaign and a friendly group of Quakers, in an attempt to drive the two groups apart.

The Federal Bureau of Investigation (FBI) strove to monitor and disrupt the campaign, which it code-named "POCAM". The FBI, which had been targeting King since 1962 with COINTELPRO, increased its efforts after King's April 4, 1967 speech titled "Beyond Vietnam". It also lobbied government officials to oppose King on the grounds that he was a communist, "an instrument in the hands of subversive forces seeking to undermine the nation", and affiliated with "two of the most dedicated and dangerous communists in the country" (Stanley Levison and Harry Wachtel). After "Beyond Vietnam" these efforts were reportedly successful in turning lawmakers and administration officials against King, the SCLC, and the cause of civil rights. After King was assassinated and the marches got underway, reports began to emphasize the threat of black militancy instead of communism.

Operation POCAM became the first major project of the FBI's Ghetto Informant Program (GIP), which recruited thousands of people to report on poor black communities. Through GIP, the FBI quickly established files on SCLC recruiters in cities across the US. FBI agents posed as journalists, used wiretaps, and even recruited some of the recruiters as informants.

The FBI sought to disrupt the campaign by spreading rumors that it was bankrupt, that it would not be safe, and that participants would lose welfare benefits upon returning home. Local bureaus reported particular success for intimidation campaigns in Birmingham, Alabama, Savannah, Georgia, and Cleveland, Ohio. In Richmond, Virginia, the FBI collaborated with the John Birch Society to set up an organization called Truth About Civil Turmoil (TACT). TACT held events featuring a Black woman named Julia Brown who claimed to have infiltrated the civil rights movement and exposed its Communist leadership.

== Events, 1968 ==
=== Memphis sanitation strike ===
In February–March 1968, King directed his attention to the Memphis sanitation strike. Although King continued to tour to raise support for the marches to Washington, he declared the Memphis strike to be a major part of the campaign itself.

On March 28, unusual violent incidents in Memphis brought negative media scrutiny to the Poor People's Campaign. The FBI released negative editorials for newspaper publication, implying that the Memphis outbursts foreshadowed mass violence by the Poor People's Campaign in Washington. The SCLC released counter-editorials which included the statement, "The issue at stake is not violence vs. nonviolence but POVERTY AND RACISM".

=== Assassination ===
King flew back to Memphis on April 3 and was murdered in the evening of the following day. The assassination of King dealt a major blow to the campaign, leading to greater emphasis on affirmative action than on race-blind policies such as King's recommendation of basic income in his last book.

At King's funeral on April 9, 1968, tens of thousands marched through Atlanta with Coretta Scott King—following King's casket on a mule-drawn wagon.

The SCLC, now led by Ralph Abernathy, held a retreat in Atlanta on April 16–17. They resolved to proceed with the campaign after learning that the Memphis strike had ended in relative success. The SCLC applied for a permit to camp on the Washington Mall and reoriented the campaign away from civil disobedience and towards the creation and maintenance of a tent city.

The edition of April 16 Look magazine carried a posthumous article from King titled "Showdown for Nonviolence"—his last statement on the Poor People's Campaign. The article warns of imminent social collapse and suggests that the campaign presents government with what may be its last opportunity to achieve peaceful change—through an Economic Bill of Rights.

== The Committee of 100 ==
The Committee of 100 was a group formed to lobby for the Poor People's Campaign in advance of the arrival of thousands for Resurrection City. On April 29, 1968, the Committee began lobbying members of Congress and leaders of executive agencies. The group, a diverse coalition of different people from around the country, acted as a formal lobby that delivered organized presentations of the campaign's demands. Tijerina was arrested in New Mexico (on charges that had earlier been dismissed) hours before he was scheduled to leave for Washington to join the lobby. His arrest was interpreted as an intentional effort to thwart the campaign. SCLC leaders including Abernathy, Young, and Lafayette were present and led delegations. Poor people from around the country made up most of the group. Many officials perceived even this group as threatening.

The Committee demanded an Economic Bill of Rights with five planks:

1. "A meaningful job at a living wage"
2. "A secure and adequate income" for all those unable to find or do a job
3. "Access to land" for economic uses
4. "Access to capital" for poor people and minorities to promote their own businesses
5. Ability for ordinary people to "play a truly significant role" in the government

Abernathy defended these demands by highlighting the use of slave labor in the production of America's capital and arguing that historically oppressed populations did not have the same opportunities as whites who already controlled economic and political resources. Regarding the last point, Abernathy also made specific call for collective bargaining, invoking King's recent involvement with the Memphis strike.

The Committee visited several executive agencies to raise awareness and make demands:

- The Committee made a separate stop at the Department of Justice, where it demanded legal reforms including an end to police brutality against Mexican Americans and indigenous Americans. Attorney General Ramsey Clark responded that "man is not the most efficient or effective creature we would hope him to be," and, "We'll do our best and I hope you will do yours."
- At the Department of Labor, the Committee met with Secretary William Wirtz to demand jobs, living wages, job training, input on labor policy, and an end to discrimination. The Committee also called attention to the high unemployment rate among minorities, which they believed to be underreported by the Department.
- The Committee had particularly sharp criticism for the Department of Agriculture, which they said had done little to address the crisis of hunger and malnutrition in the United States—and in fact neglected to use available funds to feed the starving and malnourished. They called for food stamps, school lunches, and distribution programs, which would be staffed by some of those who needed jobs. They also criticized the favoritism showed for corporate farming and demanded protection for poor small farmers. Secretary Orville Freeman was reportedly dismissive, and downplayed his Department's responsibility for the subsidies to corporate agribusiness.
- The Office of Economic Opportunity was intended specifically to assist poor people. A contingent of the Committee, led by Andrew Young, made the case that the OEO had failed in its responsibility and failed to authentically involve poor people in its decision making.
- Young led a delegation the next day to the Department of Health, Education, and Welfare. A statement read by Lafayette highlighted duality and hypocrisy within the American medical system: "We come to ask why a rich nation with the most advanced medical knowledge in the world can develop artificial organs yet cannot provide inoculations against disease to many of its poorest children." The Committee also presented a long list of specific demands surrounding health care, which mostly involved expanding the medical system to make it more accessible to the poor (while creating jobs in the process). Walter Fauntroy read a separate statement about education, which called for increased minority control of education through policies that "permit poor black, brown, and white children to express their own worth and dignity as human beings, as well as the extent to which instruction, teaching materials, and the total learning process stresses the contributions and the common humanity of minority groups." The delegation called for democratic control over schools and curricula, transparency of school budgets, affirmative action in HEW's own hiring practices, and real progress on desegregation. Finally, they made similar demands for democracy and dignity in the administration of welfare.
- At the Department of Housing and Urban Development, the Committee demanded low-incoming housing and enforcement of laws against housing discrimination. In particular they outlined a work program that would allow poor people to construct and rehabilitate housing. They also demanded Chicago participation in housing policy and greater inclusion of Spanish speakers in low-cost housing programs. And they criticized "urban renewal" programs, which they (following James Baldwin) called "Urban Negro Removal". Secretary Robert C. Weaver said he was doing the best he could.
- The Committee of 100 also visited Secretary Dean Rusk at the State Department to demand enforcement of the Treaty of Guadalupe Hidalgo, limitations on immigration while Americans still lacked jobs, and cessation of diplomatic relations with South Africa and Portugal because of their governments' racist policies.
- At the Department of the Interior, the Committee presented a list of concerns related to the situation of American Indians. They repeated demands of jobs or income, housing, and schools. They also criticized the cultural assimilation of young Indians. There was some accusations that the Bureau of Indian Affairs was intentionally inculcating racism against Blacks among Indian Americans.

The Committee of 100 also lobbied the Senate Committee on Manpower, Employment, and Poverty, which had more direct power to act and appropriate funds. The Senate Committee created a new ad hoc poverty committee that met during the Poor People's Campaign occupation.

Media reports were mixed on the Committee of 100. Many delegates received the opportunity to tell their stories for the first time, publicly challenging those in power (who typically enjoyed automatic access to the media). Congress's reaction, as quoted in the media, was hostile. Appropriations chair George H. Mahon suggested that the Committee would be mostly ignored because Congress could not "legislate under threats of violence.

On June 5, activist Bayard Rustin had drafted an "Economic Bill of Rights," which he published in The New York Times with more specific aims intended to convince the middle class and labor groups to support the action. Rustin suggested that the federal government should:

1. Recommit to the Full Employment Act of 1946 and legislate the immediate creation of at least one million socially useful career jobs in public service;
2. Adopt the pending Housing and Urban Development Act of 1968;
3. Repeal the 90th Congress's punitive welfare restrictions in the 1967 Social Security Act;
4. Extend to all farm workers the right—guaranteed under the National Labor Relations Act – to organize agricultural labor unions;
5. Restore budget cuts for bilingual education, Head Start, summer jobs, Economic Opportunity Act, Elementary and Secondary Education Acts.

== Roads to Resurrection City ==
On Sunday May 12, 1968, demonstrators led by Coretta Scott King began a two-week protest in Washington, D.C., demanding an Economic Bill of Rights. May 12 was Mothers' Day, and five thousand people marched to protest 1967 cuts to Head Start, as well as Senator Long's description of mothers on welfare as "brood mares" and other elements of mounting racist stigmatization.

Throughout May, nine major caravans of poor people gathered and prepared to converge on Washington. One caravan originated at the Edmund Pettus Bridge in Selma, Alabama. Others originated in Los Angeles, Seattle, and San Francisco. Most media attention was focused on Mule Train, which departed on May 13 (the last to leave) from Marks, Mississippi.

Marshals for many of the caravans were militant young Black men, often affiliated with radical groups like the Memphis Invaders, who had been connected to the outburst of violence in March.

The FBI gathered copious information (including photographs) about each caravan, concerning participants, route, finances, and supplies. The marchers received assistance from the Department of Justice's Community Relations Service Division, newly led by Roger Wilkins, which negotiated with local governments to help Campaign proceed smoothly.

The only incident of police brutality on the march came at Detroit's Cobo Center, where police surrounded a stalled van, provoking a standoff that eventually led to marchers being clubbed and stomped by mounted police.

== Resurrection City ==
On Tuesday, May 21, 1968, thousands of poor people set up a shantytown known as "Resurrection City," which existed for six weeks. The city had its own zip code, 20013.

=== Building the camp ===
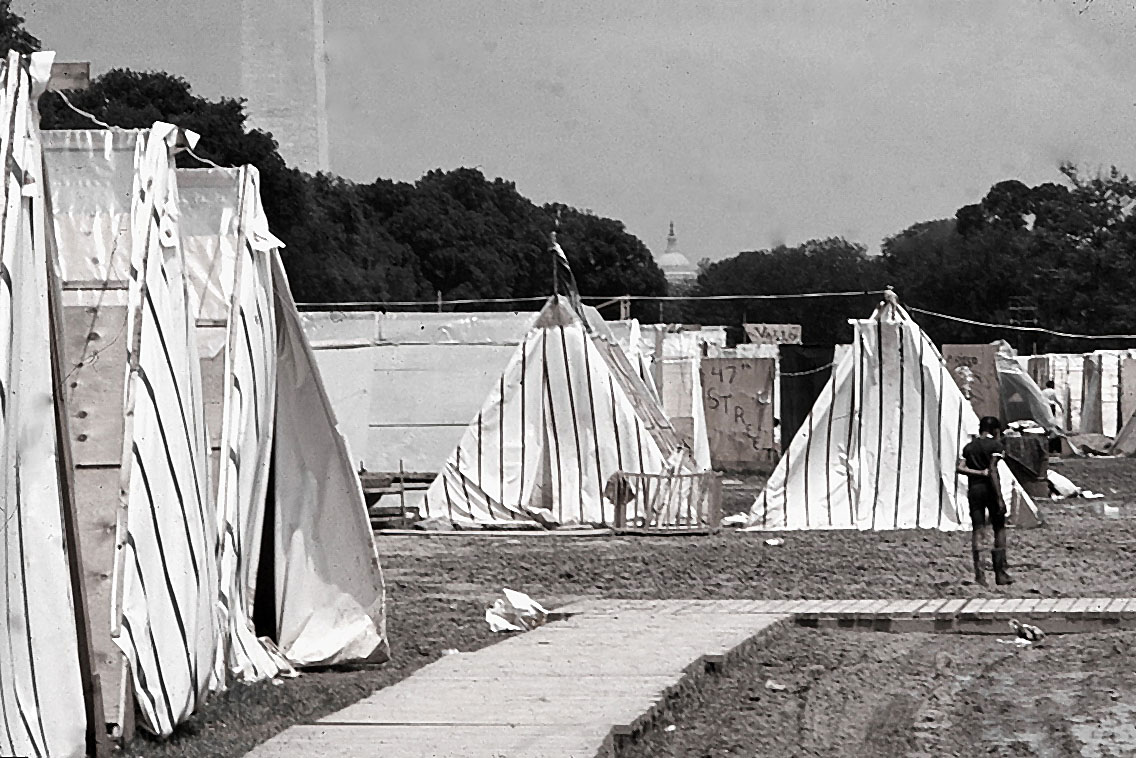
A row of tents set up in the shantytown

The City initially scrambled to build shelters and meet basic needs of its initial 3000 residents. Many people volunteered to help construct shelters for the campaign's Building and Structures Committee, chaired by University of Maryland architect John Wiebenson. This group and students laid out plans for sanitation, transportation and meeting spaces while other volunteers assisted in setting up and running kitchens and health care services. The group struggled in choosing a name and a location for the demonstration, and did not decide on "Resurrection City" and the National Mall until two days before the arrival of marchers. In exchange for a permit to camp on the most famous strip of grass in the United States, the campaign agreed to limit the city to 3000 people and 36 days. Under the leadership of Walter Reuther, the United Auto Workers donated $55,000 to support the establishment of Resurrection City.

The group was, of course, poor to begin with, and had now gambled on survival in a strange environment. The Baltimore Afro-American reported that the camp, receiving a flood of donations and volunteers, had reached a sort of equilibrium by Friday (May 24) of that week. It also reported the appearance of celebrity visitors, including D.C. Mayor Walter Washington, Illinois Senator Charles H. Percy, and prominent SNCC leader Stokely Carmichael.

Reports surfaced quickly that some of the young marshals were bullying people, particularly white journalists who had been invited to cover the city. It also encountered confusion and criticism when Bernard Lafayette announced that Resurrection City needed $3 million, but couldn't convincingly explain why.

=== Activity ===
SCLC leaders led groups of residents on marches and small excursions in attempts to meet with members of Congress. These actions were mostly uneventful. The City never conducted large-scale civil disobedience actions in Washington as King had envisioned.

The Community Relations Service sent agents, dubbed the "RC squad", who monitored and assisted the camp, actively endeavoring to sustain its morale.

FBI surveillance of the campaign also continued with agents posing as journalists and payment of Black informants within the City. Military intelligence also spied on the city, wiretapping the campaign, posing as press and generally duplicating FBI efforts.

=== Everyday life ===
Thousands of people lived in Resurrection City and in some ways it resembled other cities. Gordon Mantler writes:

Resurrection City also became a community with all of the tensions that any society contains: hard work and idleness, order and turmoil, punishment and redemption. Businesses flourished inside the tent city's walls, as did street crime. Older men informally talked politics while playing checkers or having their hair cut; others argued in more formal courses and workshops.

There were unusual problems but there was also unusual dignity. Residents called it "the city where you don't pay taxes, where there's no police brutality and you don't go to jail." Resurrection City had a university, a "Soul Tent", a psychiatrist, and a city hall.

=== Demoralization ===
The group suffered from political demoralization, conflicts over leadership, racial tension, and, always, difficult living conditions. Permanent residents became fewer as the occupation went on. People reported discipline problems, attributed to a few problematic residents who continually harassed and abused their neighbors. Abernathy was criticized for staying in a hotel and for cooperating with the Johnson administration to reduce the impact of the demonstration.

The camp suffered from the mud produced by continual rain, which at one point created standing water five inches deep. The wet and muddy protestors nevertheless made numerous mostly unsuccessful efforts to meet with their members of Congress.

Resurrection City was stunned when Robert F. Kennedy was assassinated on June 5; many took this second killing as a sign of bad things to come. Kennedy's funeral procession passed through Resurrection City en route to Arlington National Cemetery and many residents joined the group in singing "The Battle Hymn of the Republic" at the Lincoln Memorial.

=== Hawthorne School ===
Some marchers, including the grand majority of Chicano activists, chose to live in the Hawthorne School, an alternative high school in D.C. a few miles away from Resurrection City. Not only did the school offer dry conditions, in contrast to Resurrection City, it also witnessed interesting interactions between people of different backgrounds. Residents referred to it as a tight-knit community in which cultural exchange flourished between Chicanos, poor Appalachian whites, and other folks escaping the poor weather. It was also from Hawthorne where protesters marched to the Supreme Court and held one of the campaign's most captivating protests. Opposed to a recent court ruling on native fishing rights, the mostly African-American, Chicano, and Native American protesters pounded on the court's front doors and received considerable media attention.

=== Solidarity Day ===
A Solidarity Day rally, initially planned for May 30, was postponed by Abernathy, who asked Bayard Rustin to organize the rescheduled event. On June 8, however, it was announced that Rustin had been dropped from the Poor People's Campaign following a fallout with Ralph Abernathy, who believed Rustin's proposal for an Economic Bill of Rights ignored many issues important to SCLC's campaign partners, including opposition to the Vietnam War. Following Rustin's departure, SCLC leaders agreed to appoint Washington Urban League Director Sterling Tucker, who was relatively unknown outside the Washington metro area, to lead the Solidarity Day march. Solidarity Day was ultimately held on Wednesday, June 19 (Juneteenth), and attracted between 50,000 and 100,000 people (including many whites). The crowd was addressed not only by SCLC leaders—including Abernathy and Coretta Scott King (who spoke against the Vietnam War)—but also by Tijerina, Native American activist Martha Grass, and politicians such as Eugene McCarthy (whom they applauded) and Hubert Humphrey (whom they booed). In addition, Walter Reuther, president of the United Auto Workers, gave a speech to the assembled crowd. Under Reuther's leadership, the UAW brought 80 busloads of union members to the event, representing the largest contingent from any organization. Puerto Rican and Chicano marchers held a separate rally on the weekend before when people were less likely to be working.

=== Eviction ===
On Thursday, June 20, police fired several canisters of tear gas into the city—reportedly after members of the Milwaukee NAACP provoked them by throwing rocks. Life in the camp had become extremely chaotic. There were reports of vandalism from escaped mental patients. A number of people were hospitalized but none were seriously injured. On Sunday, June 23, a white visitor to the camp was beaten, shot in the knee, and robbed. Abernathy accused police of provoking "all the violence"—through "paid infiltrators" and with the use of tear gas canisters and Molotov cocktails—and called for an investigation into "mass police brutality against the people of Resurrection City."

When the demonstration's National Park Service permit expired on Sunday, June 23, 1968, some members of the House of Representatives called for immediate removal.

On June 24, over one thousand police officers arrived to clear the camp and its 500 remaining residents. Some had been led by Abernathy to another site for a pre-arranged arrest. In the camp, police still found some people singing and clapping. Police systematically searched the camp's shelters and arrested people inside and nearby the city. Police ultimately arrested 288 demonstrators including Abernathy.

On the afternoon of June 24, police reported being hit with rocks near 14th Street & U Street, an intersection central to April's riots following the King assassination. Broken windows and a fire bomb were also reported. One hundred police in riot gear responded with tear gas. The area was sealed off, a curfew was declared, and Mayor Washington declared a state of emergency. 450 National Guardsman began patrolling the streets that night, and few incidents were reported (one man leaving a liquor store was wounded by a police officer's bullet).

== Aftermath and impact ==
An economic bill of rights was never passed, and leaders spoke with regret about the occupation. SCLC director Bill Rutherford described the campaign as the movement's "Little Bighorn." Andrew Young, vice president of the SCLC, suggested that Resurrection City was spending $27,000 a week on food (equivalent to $250,000 in 2025) and had been about to run out of money. The mainstream media contrasted the Poor People's Campaign unfavorably with (an idealized version of) the 1963 March on Washington, which they portrayed as organized and palatable.

The campaign did produce some changes, however subtle. They included more money for free and reduced lunches for school children and Head Start programs in Mississippi and Alabama. The USDA released surplus commodities to the nation's one-thousand poorest counties, food stamps were expanded, and some federal welfare guidelines were streamlined. Marian Wright Edelman formed a network of agency bureaucrats concerned about poverty issues. Activists in the National Welfare Rights Organization also gained important connections in the capital. Meanwhile, other marchers, especially Chicano activists, spoke of eye-opening experiences that made them more sophisticated in their thinking about poverty and their relationships with each other, when they returned West.

The SCLC organized a protest caravan, driven by mule-power, to work its way down to the Republican National Convention in Miami Beach, Florida, in early August. Nixon continued to make rioting a campaign issue, explicitly seeking the votes of suburban whites, "the nonshouters, the nondemonstrators", by promising increased policing, crackdowns on rioters, and an end to educational integration.

The Mule Train traveled on and arrived in Chicago for the turbulent Democratic Convention in Chicago, where the demonstrators got caught in the midst of violence in the streets surrounding the convention site.

In 1969, a Poor People's Campaign delegation, including Abernathy, met with President Nixon and asked him to address hunger and malnutrition.

During the 1972 Democratic National Convention, Abernathy and the SCLC organized "Resurrection City II" in Miami. There, they camped alongside other groups, including Students for a Democratic Society and Jerry Rubin's Yippies.

In 2017, the Poor People's Campaign: A National Call for a Moral Revival was launched with the goal of bringing the original work of the Poor People's Campaign forward.

== See also ==
- Bonus Army
- Coxey's Army
- March on Washington Movement
- Poor People's Campaign: A National Call for a Moral Revival
- Poor People's Economic Human Rights Campaign
- Occupy D.C.
- COINTELPRO
