= Ghetto Informant Program =

American FBI intelligence operation

The Ghetto Informant Program (GIP) was an intelligence-gathering operation run by the Federal Bureau of Investigation (FBI) from 1967 to 1973. Its official purpose was to collect information pertaining to riots and civil unrest. Through GIP, the FBI used more than 7,000 people to infiltrate poor black communities in the United States.

== Background ==
After the Watts Riots of 1965, and further unrest in Newark and Detroit in the summer of 1967, the US government mobilized to prepare for urban conflict. Its actions ranged from commissioning a report by the civilian Kerner Commission to mobilizing the army to prepare for martial law in American cities.

The order for GIP program came in a letter from Attorney General Ramsey Clark to FBI director J. Edgar Hoover. Clark wrote:

We have not heretofore had to deal with the possibility of an organized pattern of violence, constituting a violation of federal law, by a group of persons who make the urban ghetto their base of operation and whose activities may not have been regularly monitored by existing intelligence sources.

And:

As a part of the broad investigation which must necessarily be conducted ... sources or informants in black nationalist organizations, SNCC and other less publicized groups should be developed and expanded to determine the size and purpose of these groups and their relationship to other groups, and also to determine the whereabouts of persons who might be involved in instigating riot activity in violation of federal law.

The GIP coincided with COINTELPRO–BLACK HATE.

== Scope ==
The program was targeted at those likely to have information about ghetto happenings. Thus (according to an internal memo) it included people such as "the proprietor of a candy store or barber shop" in a ghetto area. These informants were "listening posts"—tools for blanket surveillance of a community or area. GIP operated with no oversight from courts or Congress.

Informants monitored "Key Black Extremists" such as Martin Luther King Jr., Malcolm X, Elijah Muhammad, Stokely Carmichael, H. Rap Brown, Floyd McKissick, Huey Newton, and more. One of the first major projects involving the GIP was Operation POCAM, the FBI's effort to monitor and disrupt the 1968 Poor People's Campaign. Informants were later asked to report on Afro-American bookstores and investigate the existence of subversive literature.

At least 67 informants were members of the Black Panther Party (BPP), tasked with spreading disinformation as well as sending reports to the FBI. Recent disclosures have suggested that photographer Ernest Withers was a paid FBI informant under the GIP.

== Termination ==
Church Committee Report Book III, which reported some details on the Ghetto Informant Program

In 1972, the FBI's Inspection Division began to express concern about using African-American informants specifically to investigate civil unrest. A memo dated November 24, 1972, notes that the GIP has produced abundant 'byproduct' information related to activities other than rioting. It suggests that these informants be reclassified as Security, Extremist, Revolutionary Activities, or Criminal, and that civil unrest information continue to be collected as a byproduct from these same informants.

The GIP was terminated in July 1973, and informants were either reclassified or discontinued.

Concerns about FBI surveillance in the style of the Ghetto Informant Program has continued through the present day. Senator Patrick Leahy compared Operation TIPS to the GIP in 2002.
