= Campbell Village, Oakland, California =

Neighborhood of Oakland, California

Coordinates: 37°48′30″N 122°17′56″W

Campbell Village is a neighborhood of Oakland, California in Alameda County, California. It lies at an elevation of 16 feet (5 m). Campbell Village is the site of the Campbell Village Court housing projects.
