= Liberty Hall (Oakland, California) =

- U.S. National Register of Historic Places
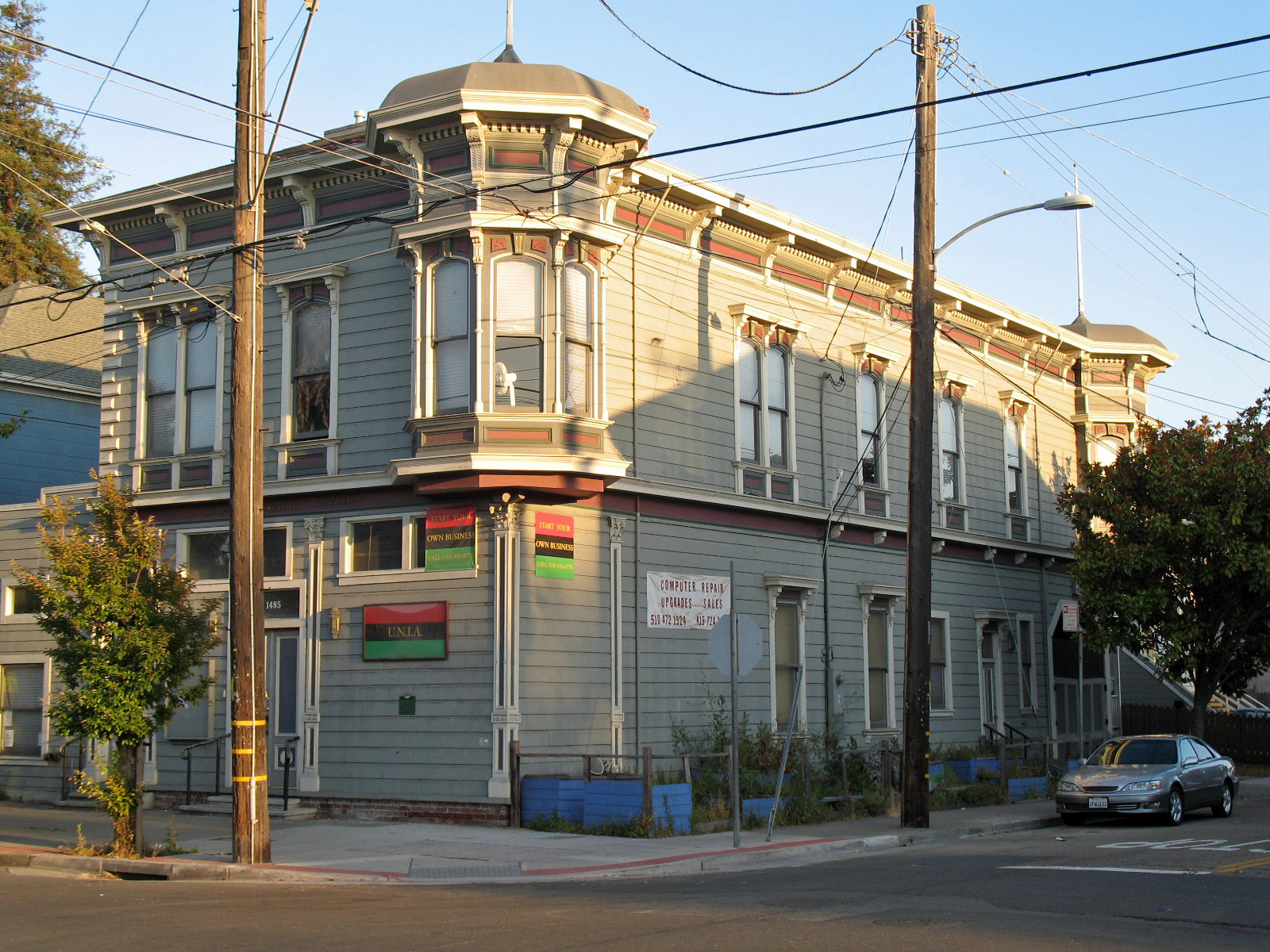

- Location within Oakland, California Location within California Location within the United States
- Location: 1483--1485 8th St., Oakland, California
- Coordinates: 37°48′23″N 122°17′40″W
- Area: 0.1 acres (0.040 ha)
- Built: 1877
- Architectural style: Italianate
- NRHP reference No.: 89000199
- Added to NRHP: March 30, 1989

Liberty Hall is a historic meeting hall used by African-American organizations in the Lower Bottoms neighborhood of Oakland, California. The building, located at 1483-1485 8th St., was built in 1877 as a store and residence. The building was designed in the Italianate style and features projecting bays at its northwest and southwest corners, a bracketed cornice, a frieze with dentils and crown moldings, and a hipped roof.

Local 188 of the Universal Negro Improvement Association, the African-American fraternal organization founded by Marcus Garvey, purchased the building for its headquarters in 1925. Founded in 1920, Local 188 was the largest chapter of the UNIA in northern California. The chapter renamed the building Liberty Hall, the name used by all of the UNIA's meeting halls. During its time in the building, the UNIA used it for its meetings, activities, and holidays such as Lincoln's Birthday and Garvey Day. A fire burnt the building's roof in 1931, and the UNIA's activism in Oakland declined afterward. The organization sold the building in 1933.

After the UNIA left the building, one of Oakland's chapters of the International Peace Mission movement took over the building. The International Peace Mission was a religious movement led by Father Divine, an African-American preacher from New York. Father Divine, who was considered the Second Coming by his followers, was known for hosting free banquets at his home during the Great Depression. The International Peace Mission continued to operate in the building until the 1950s, though its activities declined after the early 1940s.

The building was added to the National Register of Historic Places on March 30, 1989.

Liberty Hall has most recently been owned by a group of community nonprofits led by OWH (Overcomers With Hope) Studios, a broadcast and media arts training program and television studio space for youth, veterans, and other community members in need of skill-building. As of 2024, the space was in use mainly by OWH Studios and by the Jack London Square Chapel, a local COGIC church.
