= Dogtown, Oakland, California =

Coordinates: 37.8245°N 122.286°W

Dogtown is a nickname for a portion of West Oakland (officially Clawson) in the city of Oakland, California. Oakland Police officers coined the phrase due to a large population of stray dogs dating from the early 1980s. It is bounded on the east by Adeline Street, on the west by Mandela Parkway (previously the Cypress Street Viaduct), and its north–south limits are the 580 freeway and 28th Street. The area is undergoing rapid redevelopment from former industrial uses to live-work and other residential forms.
