= Campbell Village Court, Oakland, California =

Housing projects in Oakland, California, United States

Coordinates: 37.80869°N 122.29898°W

The Campbell Village Court housing projects are a series of complexes located in the Campbell Village part of the Lower Bottoms area of West Oakland California. Campbell Village Court is bounded by Willow Street to the west, Campbell Street to the east, 10th street to the north, and 8th street to the south.

Campbell Village was first housing project of the Oakland Housing Authority. It was funded by the Housing Act of 1937 which required a similar number of homes to be demolished as would be created. To make way for the project, 67 homes were demolished as well as the Mount Zion Missionary Baptist Church.

Campbell Village opened in June, 1941 with 154 units.
