= Mark Comfort =

American activist (1934–1976)

- Comfort photographed in Sacramento, California on May 2, 1967, when the Black Panthers "stormed" the Capitol
- Born: Mark Everett Comfort; February 6, 1934; Oklahoma, U.S.
- Died: November 6, 1976 (aged 42); Sprague River, Oregon, U.S.
- Organisation(s): Student Nonviolent Coordinating Committee; Oakland Direct Action Committee
- Political party: Black Panther Party
- Movement: Black Power Movement

Mark Everett Comfort (February 6, 1934 – November 6, 1976) was a community activist who worked in early Oakland grassroots civil rights movements in the 1960s, before moving to Lowndes County, Alabama.

He helped in the Student Nonviolent Coordinating Committee (SNCC) Black Panther project in Lowndes County, Alabama with security and self-defense against the Ku Klux Klan. He asked Stokely Carmichael if he could use the Panther name and idea to try to spread it. Carmichael told him it belonged to "the people and he should feel free to use it." With permission, he returned to Oakland and started his own Black Panther project in 1965 called the Oakland Direct Action Committee (ODAC) and was its head. He later found that other local groups liked the Black Panther name as well. He also started clubs for young black males called the Alm Boy Dukes and the Enchanted Maffions.

Mark Comfort married a white woman, Gloria Black (Oakland, California, July 16, 1937 – Klamath Falls, Oregon, October 11, 2010), on March 27, 1953, in Oakland. Mark's wife was once blocked from entering a Black Panther Party (BPP) office by a Panther member. Bobby Seale, BPP co-founder, told that member, "Are you stupid? Let her into that office." Seale felt that If Mark was a Panther, so was his wife. It didn't matter what race she was.

In 1966, the Parents Association for Better Schools was formed by Mark, his wife Gloria and members of the ODAC to press for free school lunches for needy children in the Oakland Public Schools. This project was successful, and later became the Ad Hoc Committee for Better Schools, which then worked with the Oakland School District in an effort to improve the quality of education offered to all children in the district.

In 1966, Mark Comfort was a candidate for the State Assembly and finished 4th in a field of nine in a campaign run almost entirely without funds.

Between 1966 and 1968 Comfort served on the editorial board of Oakland's The Flatlands Newspaper.

The ODAC and BPP worked together and would follow police after blacks were arrested and follow them to the police station and would often bail them out as well.

In 1967, a black man, Denzil Dowell, was shot by a Contra Costa County sheriff's deputy. A grand jury ruled the killing a "justifiable homicide". The police claimed to have shot Dowell three times, but a coroner's report noted that he bled to death after being shot ten times. The family was not allowed to see the body nor to take possession of his clothing to determine how many times he had actually been shot. When Mark contacted Huey Newton and Bobby Seale, they accepted the request for assistance. The media coverage over this gave the Black Panther Party exposure into homes of millions of Americans.

In spring 1967, Comfort, as the head of the ODAC, joined the BPP in a so-called "invasion" of the California Assembly in Sacramento. The BPP borrowed 7 of Mark's guns for the raid. At Bobby Seale's request, Mark Comfort was the last person to surrender his weapon. Upon arriving at the Assembly, the 33rd governor of California, Ronald Reagan, was speaking on the lawn to a couple hundred "future leaders" when he spotted the group of angry looking blacks approaching, and quickly left. Followed by the media they entered the assembly chambers and read "Executive Mandate Number One" written by Huey Newton, who was not present because he was on parole.

The Mandate read:

The Black Panther Party for Self-Defense calls upon the American people in general and the Black People in particular to take careful note of the racist California Legislature now considering legislation aiming at keeping black people disarmed and powerless at the very time that racist police agencies throughout the country intensify the terror, brutality, murder and repression of Black People. As the aggression of the racist American Government escalates in Vietnam, the police agencies of America escalate the repression of Black People throughout the ghettos of America. Vicious police dogs, cattle prods, and increased patrols have become familiar sights in Black communities ... The Black Panther Party for Self-Defense believes that the time has come for Black people to arm themselves against this terror before it's too late.

The group surrendered their weapons and were arrested. At Bobby Seale's request, Mark Comfort was the last person to surrender his weapon. Seale was charged with possession of a concealed weapon and the others were detained under an obscure law that made it illegal to disrupt state assembly proceedings. This event brought the group into the national spotlight turning the group into a national phenomenon. This sparked interest in the BPP increasing membership across the nation. In July 1967, after the raid, the assembly passed the Mulford Act prohibiting the public carrying of loaded firearms. This forced the BPP to disarm and disband its "police patrols".

Mark Comfort was also arrested in 1967 along with Newton and Seale following a picket of The Oakland Tribune. They and members of their party were arrested on a Sacramento street for "being a public nuisance." They were defended by Beverly Axelrod, a Sacramento attorney. Comfort was sentenced to six months in jail and served only 44 days in the Santa Rita Prison Farm after Supreme Court Justice William O. Douglas gave him a stay of sentence.

While in prison, he released the Vietnam War song "Damn Vietnam" on 7" vinyl, in the blues music genre, to raise money to pay for bail. According to the Vietnam War Song Project, Black Panther magazine, Panther Ambush published an advert of the record, writing "Above is jacket of Mark Comfort's latest 45 (not pistol) record on sale locally at Shakespeare's. It was issues frankly to raise bail for Mark. That's a good cause".
