= Prescott, Oakland, California =

Prescott
- Neighborhood of Oakland
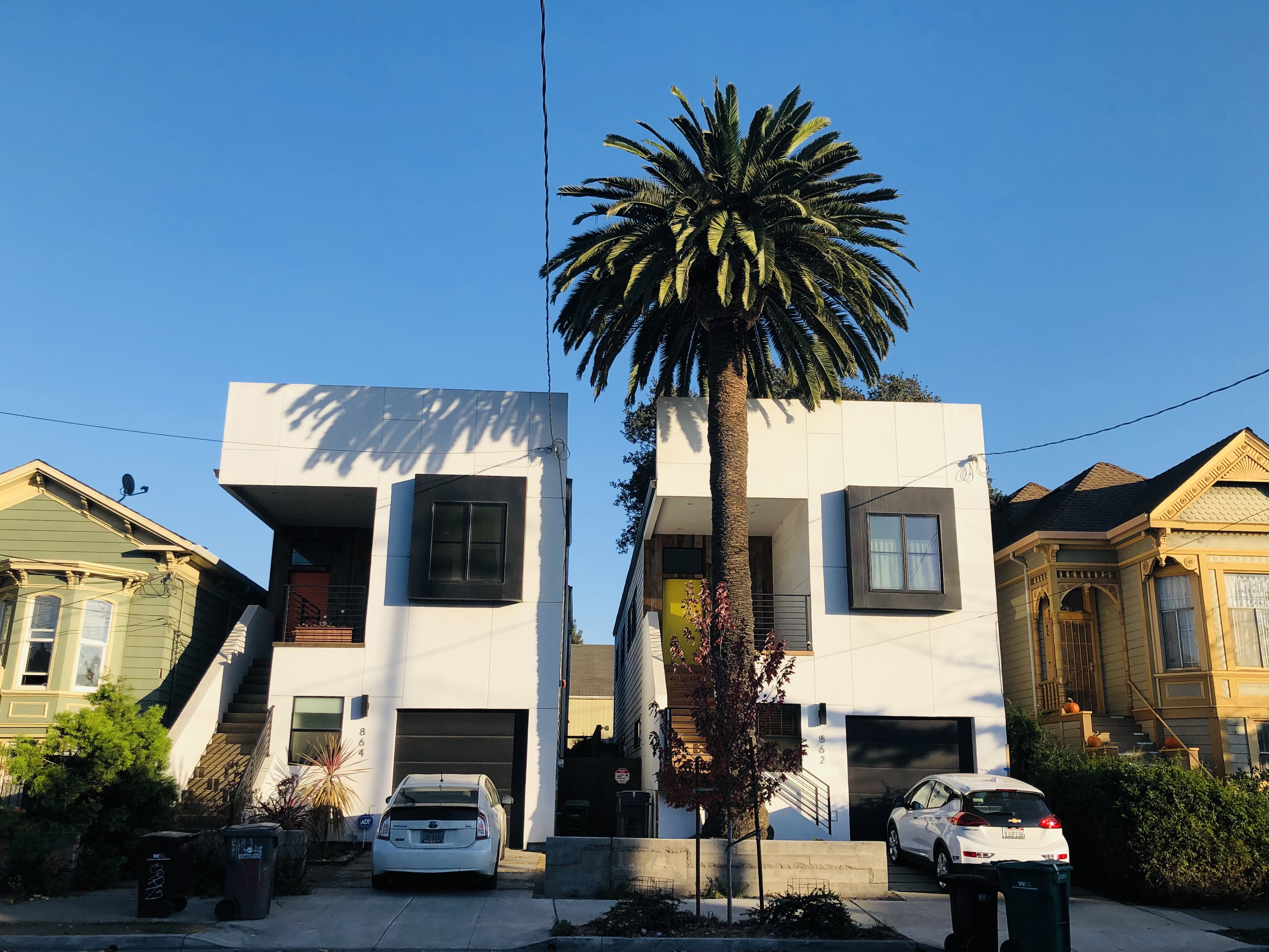
- Homes on Wood Street designed by Baran Studio Architecture

- Location within Oakland
- Coordinates: 37.8114°N 122.2939°W
- Country: United States
- State: California
- County: Alameda
- City: Oakland
- Postal code: 94607

Prescott (also known as The Lower Bottoms or The Bottoms) is a residential neighborhood and commercial district in West Oakland in Oakland, California. The neighborhood boundaries are Mandela Parkway to the east, 7th Street to the south, West Grand Avenue to the north, and Frontage Road to the west.

The small neighborhood south of 7th Street and the BART elevated track is sometimes treated as part of Lower Bottoms, and sometimes considered its own neighborhood, called South Prescott.

== History ==
The area was originally part of Oakland Point. It was a residential area of Victorian homes, many of which still stand, some in disrepair and some having undergone rehabilitation.

The neighborhood takes its name from Prescott School, which is located on the block adjacent to 10th and Campbell. Though the current school building dates to 1979, the school has been in several buildings at the same location for over 150 years. It was founded in 1869 and was named for the historian William H. Prescott, who had died in 1859, but had been very influential and was much memorialized across the United States. Prescott, Arizona is also named for him. In its early years, the school was also alternately called Point School, after Oakland Point.

Seventh Street was an African-American cultural center of Oakland from the 1940s to the 1960s, due to nightclubs such as Slim Jenkins' Place, Esther's Orbit Room and the Lincoln Theater, which drew top blues and jazz performers from across the United States. The area was sometimes referred to as "The Harlem of the West." The decline of 7th Street has been blamed on the construction of the Cypress Freeway, the Oakland Main Post Office—and subsequent BART elevated track lines, which took up much of the street.

Prescott earned its nickname "Lower Bottoms" after the construction of the Cypress Freeway in the 1950s that split the West Oakland neighborhood in two and isolated Oakland Point from the remainder of West Oakland. The one housing project is Campbell Village Court. The neighborhood has suffered from high rates of crime, gang activity, and poverty since the decline of Oakland's industrial economy in the late 20th century.

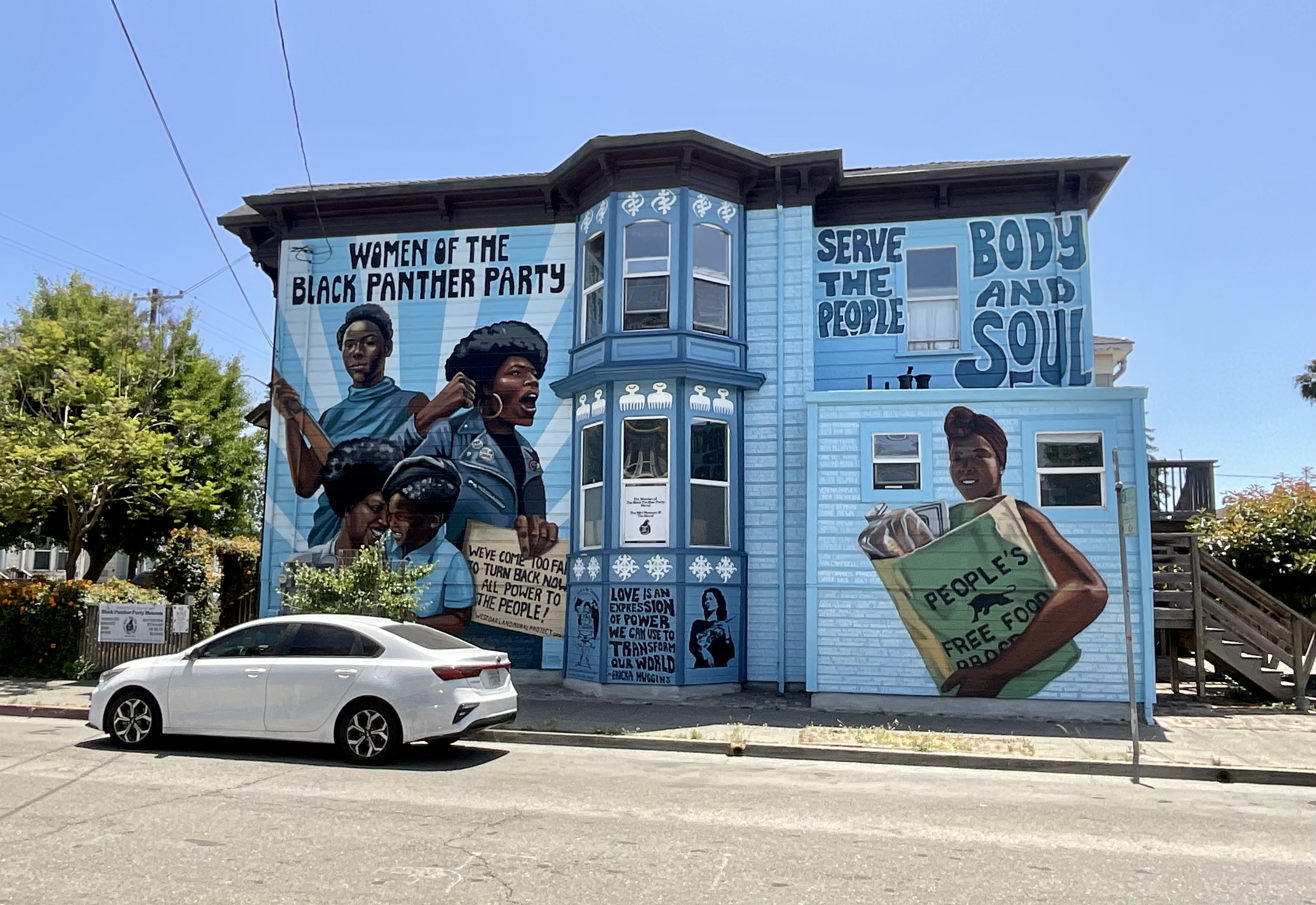
Women of the Black Panther Party Mural, Dr. Huey P. Newton Way.

In the late 1960s, the first headquarters of the Black Panther Party was located in a Victorian house on Peralta Street near 11th. Many years later, on August 22, 1989, BPP founder Huey P. Newton was gunned down on the 1450 block of 9th Street, just a few blocks from the former Party headquarters. The shooting is alleged to have been over a failed drug deal. The street on which the shooting took place has since been renamed Dr. Huey P. Newton Way. The building immediately adjacent to where the shooting took place is now the Black Panther Party museum and is adorned with a large mural commemorating the women of the Black Panther Party. A bronze bust of Newton is located two blocks away along the walkway in the middle of Mandela Parkway, where Newton Way dead-ends.

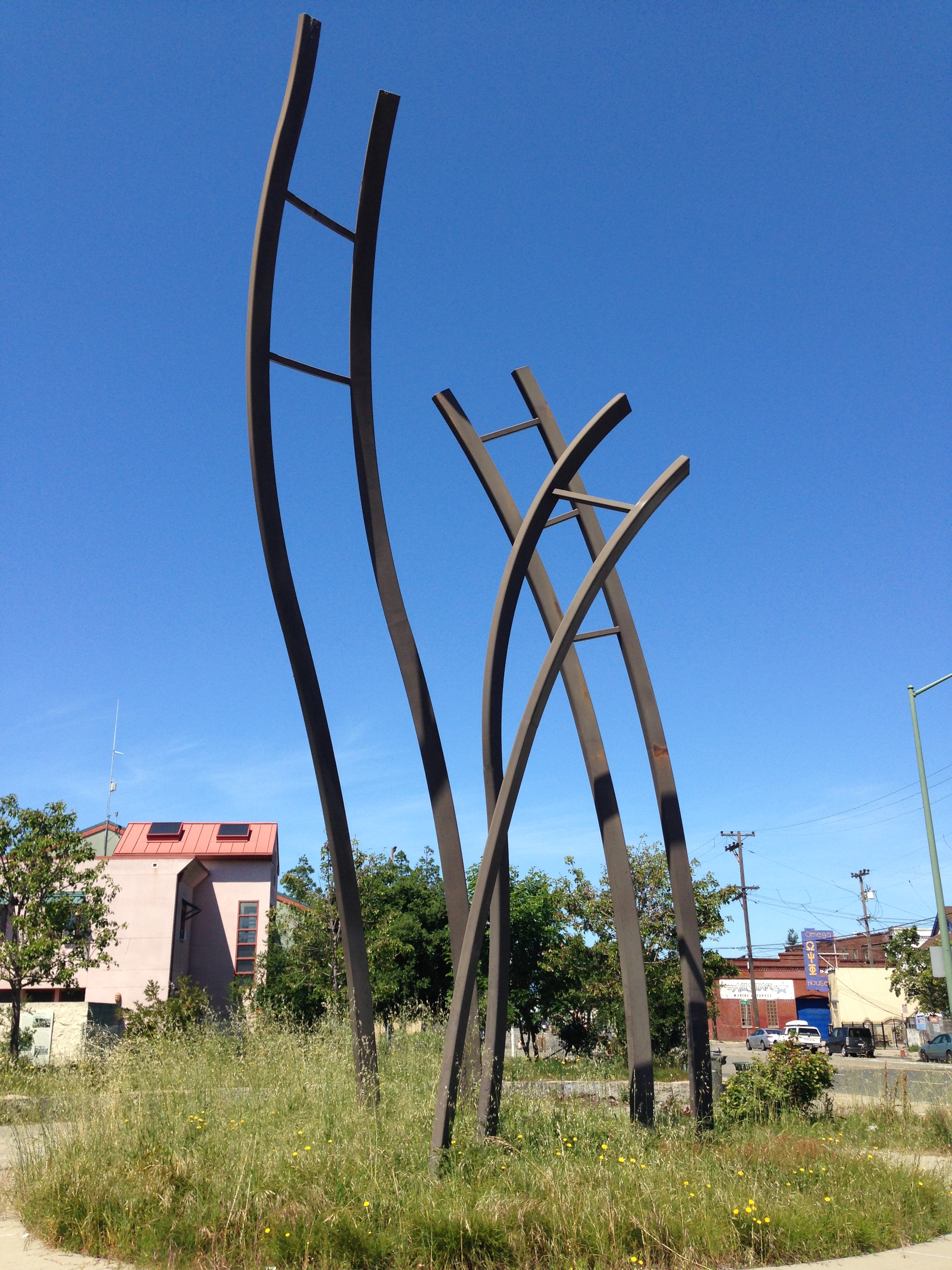
Cypress Freeway Memorial, Mandela Parkway.

During the Loma Prieta earthquake of October 17, 1989, the Cypress Street Viaduct suffered catastrophic failure and collapsed along a 1.25 mile section of the freeway. The collapse resulted in 42 deaths, the greatest loss of life in any one location from the earthquake. Following the collapse, the freeway was not rebuilt, due to environmental impact concerns, and the desire by the West Oakland community to reconnect the neighborhood with the rest of the city, among other reasons. A new route for Interstate 880 was selected along an industrial area and railroad yard around the outskirts of the neighborhood. The site of the former viaduct became Mandela Parkway, a wide urban boulevard named for South African president Nelson Mandela.

== Points of interest ==
=== Architectural landmarks ===
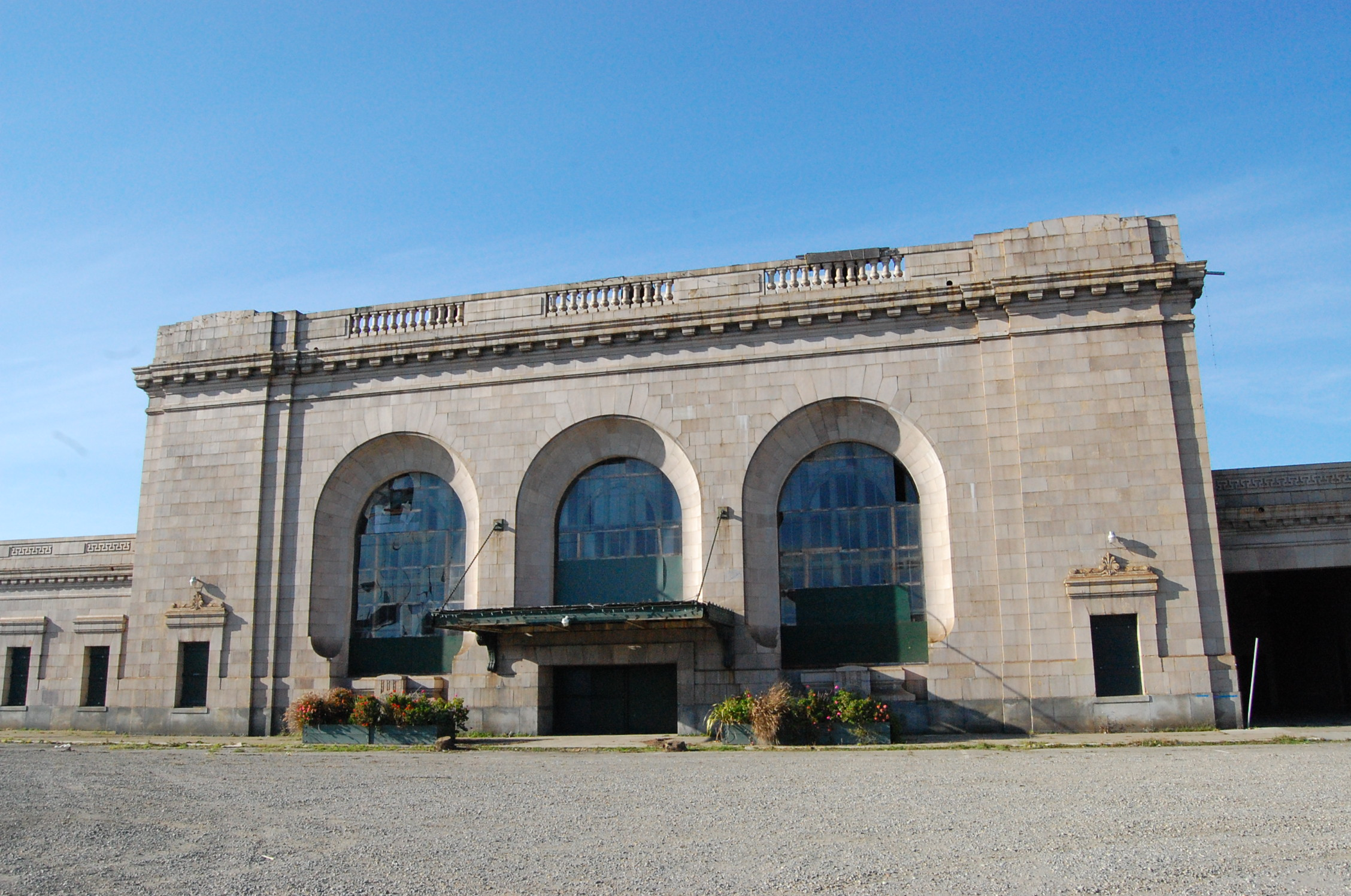
16th Street Station

16th Street Station is an abandoned Southern Pacific Railroad station and historical landmark located in the Prescott neighborhood of Oakland, California, United States. The Beaux-Arts building was designed by architect Jarvis Hunt, a preeminent railroad station architect, and opened in 1912. The station has not been served by trains since 1994, and is currently available as a rental space for private events through 2021. The station has also served as a film location for the 2005 film Rent and Vallejo rapper E-40's "Tell Me When to Go" video.

=== Performance arts ===
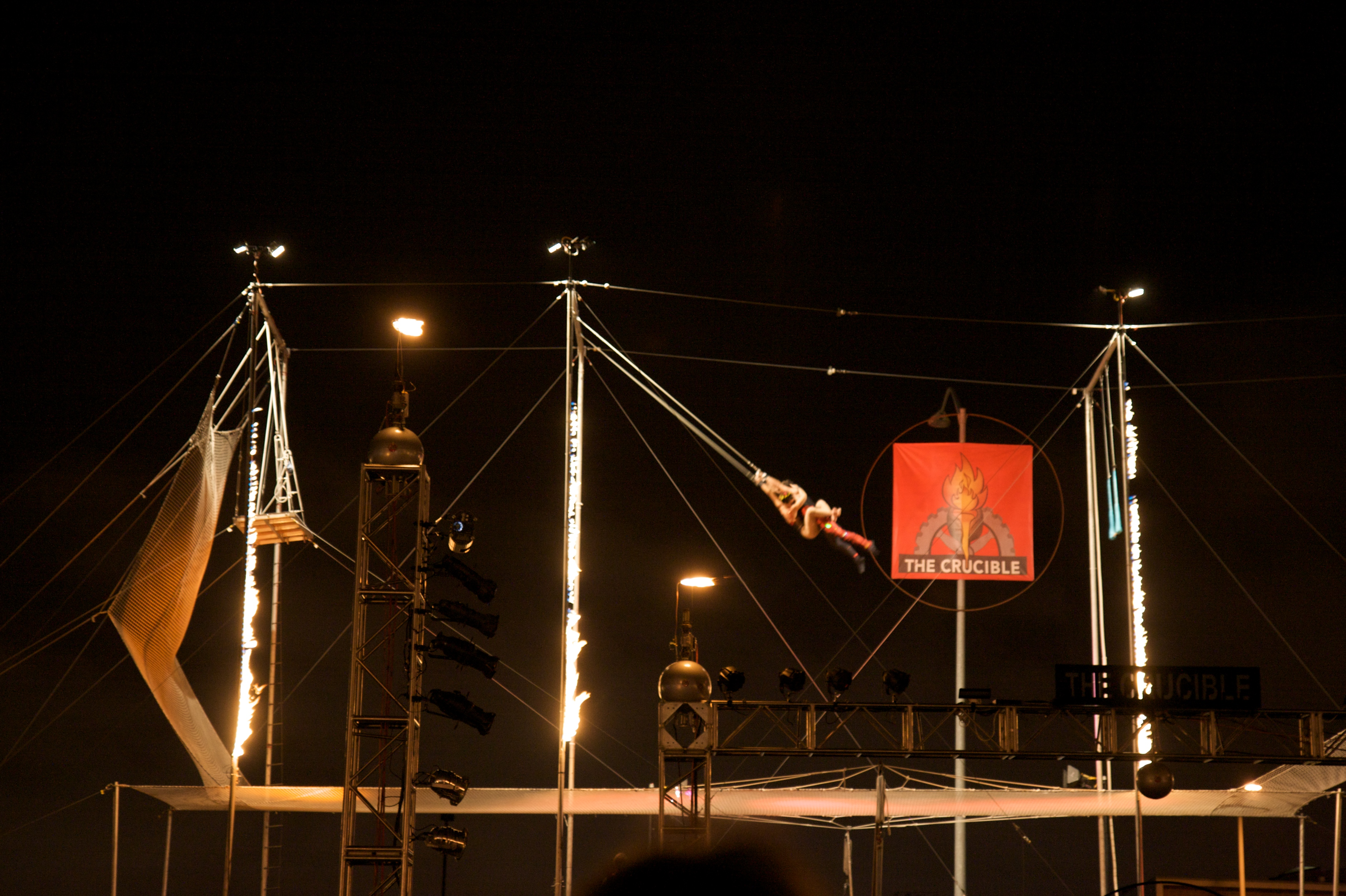
Trapeze Arts

Trapeze Arts is a performance arts school that teaches flying trapeze and other circus arts and is one of only a handful of full time circus schools in the United States.

=== Parks and green space ===
Mandela Parkway is a major street and greenway in West Oakland that was created following the collapse of the Nimitz freeway Cypress Street Viaduct on October 17, 1989 during the Loma Prieta earthquake. American Steel Studios, Horn Barbecue, and the Cypress Freeway Memorial Park are all located on Mandela Parkway and its southern end goes right into the West Oakland BART Station.

Raimondi Park is West Oakland's largest park, with 10 acres. It includes an athletic field located at 18th & Wood Streets. Dedicated in 1947, the park was named in honor of Ernie Raimondi (1919–1945), a minor league baseball player and WWII veteran who grew up in Oakland. In September 2008, the first of two stages of a $7.2 million refurbishment of the park was completed. This included new drainage systems for the playing fields. In 2024, the park was renovated to serve as the home field for the Oakland Ballers of the Pioneer League with a capacity of 4,000.

== Transportation and BART station redevelopment ==
The West Oakland BART station is located in Prescott, on 7th Street, and is one stop from downtown Oakland and downtown San Francisco. All lines except the orange line stop at the station.

In June 2020, the BART Board of Directors approved a mixed-use housing and commercial development at the West Oakland BART station that will include 762 housing units, 30 percent of which will be designated as affordable, 50,000 square feet of retail space, 300,000 square feet of office space and various amenities such as wider sidewalks and more crosswalks for pedestrians.

== Community organizations ==
Several community organizations are based in Prescott, including the Prescott Neighborhood Council, South Prescott Lower Bottoms Neighborhood Association, West Oakland Food Pantry, Alliance for West Oakland Development, and the Lower Bottom Playaz theater troupe.

In 2006, a locally owned full-service cooperative grocery store named Mandela Grocery Cooperative opened in West Oakland, providing residents access to fresh produce, and focusing on nutritional education and affordable foods grown locally.

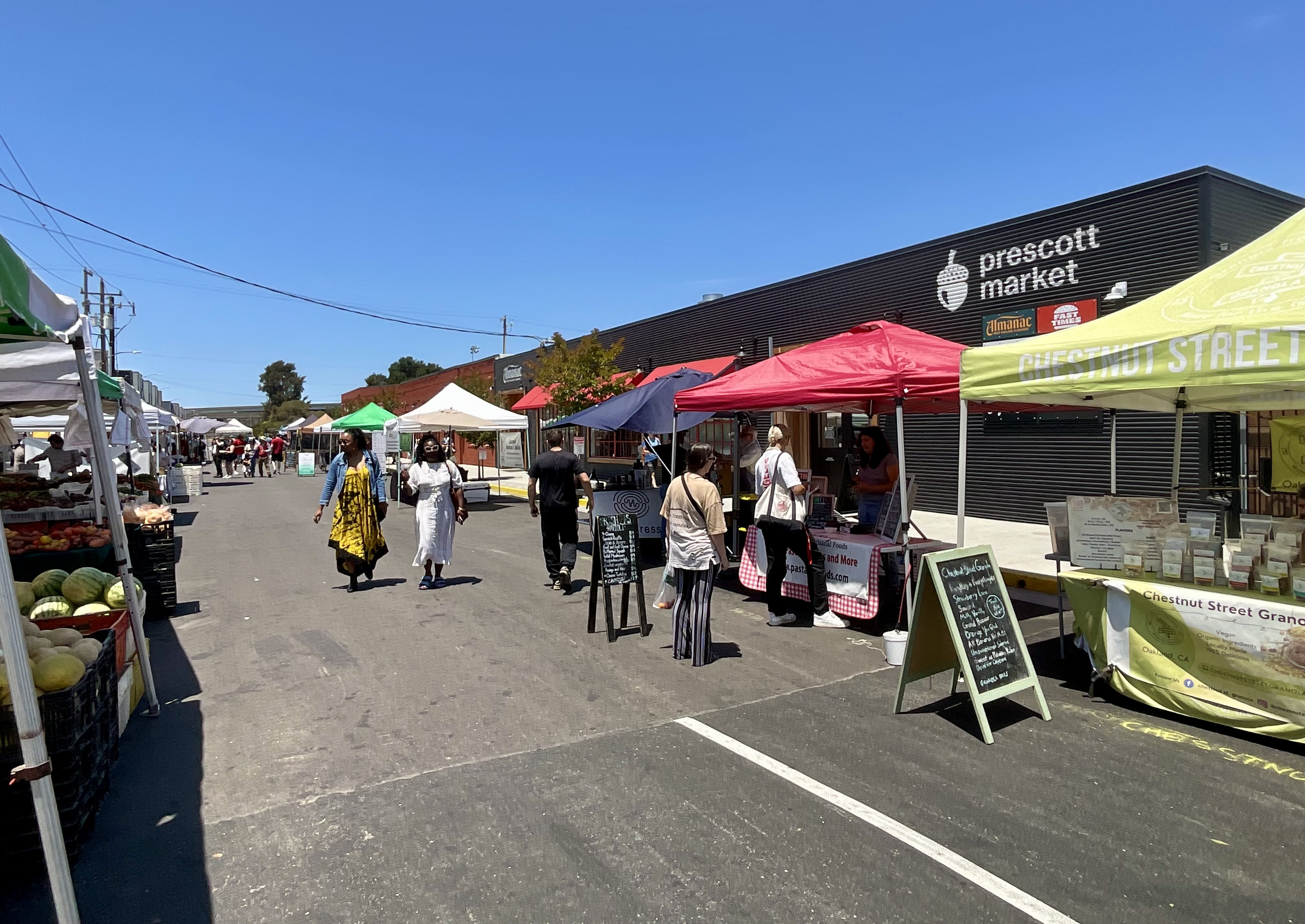
Prescott Market and West Oakland Farmers Market, 18th & Peralta Streets.

In 2022, the West Oakland Farmers Market began operating each Sunday at 18th and Peralta Streets. An occasional Thursday Night Market also takes place in the same area. This was followed in 2025 by the opening of Prescott Market, a food hall that's open daily on the same block where the farmers market is held. It is hoped that the presence of these businesses will help mitigate Prescott's status as a food desert. (Other than Mandela Grocery and a few small convenience stores, the neighborhood lacks any full-time grocery stores.) There are, however, concerns about gentrification given the high-end nature of the emerging businesses.

== Political representation ==
The entire neighborhood lies within the boundaries of Oakland's Downtown-West Oakland District 3 City Council seat.

== See also ==
- Lead contamination in Oakland
- Liberty Hall (Oakland, California)
