= The Flatlands Newspaper =

The Flatlands Newspaper (1966–1968) was published in Oakland, CA and featured news and opinion articles, profiles, photographs, and event calendars focused primarily on poverty, education, housing, police brutality, and politics in the East and West Oakland "flatlands". The newspaper was funded through a $100,000 grant from the Ford Foundation to the University of California at Berkeley in 1966. The newspaper's first issue noted that "The flatlands people have had no one to speak for them". The tagline of the newspaper read "Tell it like it is and do what is needed". The newspaper pushed for advocacy and reform for people, especially African-Americans, displaced by housing developments and Bay Area Rapid Transit (BART).

== Editorial Board ==
The following names are associated with The Flatlands Newspaper's Editorial Board:

- Curtis Lee Baker, a Black Nationalist and activist, also known as the "Black Jesus of West Oakland".
- Vera Bumcrot
- Mark Comfort
- Gloria Comfort
- Urban Dennis
- Gene Drew
- Bill Goetz
- Pauline Goetz
- John George
- Bill Lowe
- Jerry Leo
- Jack Ortega
- Agnes Woods
- Ralph Williams.
