= Oaksterdam, Oakland =

Cultural district in Oakland, California

Coordinates: 37.80721°N 122.26917°W

Oaksterdam is a cultural district on the north end of Downtown Oakland, California, where medical cannabis is available for purchase in cafés, clubs, and patient dispensaries. Oaksterdam is located between downtown proper, the Lakeside, and the financial district. It is roughly bordered by 14th Street on the southwest, Harrison Street on the southeast, 19th Street on the northeast, and Telegraph Avenue on the northwest. The name is a portmanteau of "Oakland" and "Amsterdam," due to the Dutch city's cannabis coffee shops and the drug policy of the Netherlands.

Since 2005, cannabis has been available to patients with patient identification and physician recommendation at a busy dispensary in the neighborhood, one of Oakland's four officially licensed dispensaries under the current municipal ordinance. According to Proposition 215, a statewide voter initiative which amended the California Health and Safety Code, marijuana used for medical purposes is legal to possess and cultivate. Dispensaries require a doctor's note in order to obtain medical cannabis, which is legal under California law, but still illegal under the federal Controlled Substances Act.

== History ==
The name Oaksterdam is a combination of Oakland and Amsterdam, the Dutch city that is famously tolerant towards cannabis use. The name was coined by the late Jim McClelland, an AIDS patient, who was a founding member of the Oakland Cannabis Buyers Club and the Berkeley Patients Group after prompting by Andrew Glazier, a fellow activist, that the neighborhood needed a name. The history of Oaksterdam started in 1996 with Oakland Cannabis Buyers Cooperative (OCBC) distributing to Proposition 215 patients, and with the resulting legal wrangling. Oakland Cannabis Buyers Cooperative stayed open until federal authorities ordered the cooperative to shut down. A few OCBC members (like the late Jim McClelland and late Tim Sidwell) went around the corner and opened up The Zoo. Richard Lee founded Bulldog Coffee Shop (a dispensary) in 1999 and Coffeeshop Blue Sky in 2003, naming them after cafes in Amsterdam, he envisioned a downtown Oakland revitalized by the support of his and other cannabis businesses. Lee founded Oaksterdam University in 2007.

California Attorney General Dan Lungren was opposed to Proposition 215. Dennis Peron was arrested and San Francisco's safe source of medical cannabis was shut down. The Oakland City Council made several proclamations, then designated a few patients as official medical cannabis officers, and approved the distribution of medical cannabis in accordance with Proposition 215. Oakland politicians were pro-cannabis before Proposition 215 and allowed a couple of groups to distribute. Federal authorities, however, continued to try to apply the law, despite Attorney General Eric Holder's instructions to U.S. attorneys in October 2009 that they "should not focus federal resources in your states on individuals whose actions are in clear and unambiguous compliance with existing state laws providing for the medical use of marijuana."

On April 2, 2012, the IRS raided Oaksterdam University. Nevertheless, Oaksterdam University continued to put on classes less than two days later. Incorrect reports often cite that the event was conducted by the DEA. No charges were filed. Harborside was threatened as well. Steve DeAngelo spoke out against the raids and the IRS threats and vowed to serve the patients. He reminded his followers about the patients locked up in jail. In DeAngelo's opinion, the DEA was systematically trying to destroy the medical cannabis community. In 2012, Melinda Haag, the DEA prosecutor, warned the city about dispensary closures. The IRS also took away the standard tax deduction, claiming that the medical cannabis community is a criminal enterprise. Richard Lee dissolved his interest in his businesses.

== Location and character ==
Oaksterdam is located on the north end of downtown Oakland, between downtown proper, the Lakeside and the Financial District. It is characterized by mixed-use office and residential buildings with buildings that are older than some of the modern skyscrapers south of 14th Street, and shops, restaurants and cafes.

A Julia Morgan-designed building is located at the northwest corner of 15th and Webster Streets, which was the original location of the Oakland YWCA. The neighborhood also features the Cathedral Building, an ornate, historic Flatiron Building at Latham Square at the intersection of Broadway and Telegraph.

== Educational institutions ==
The district features at least two institutions of higher learning: Lincoln University at 15th and Franklin and Oaksterdam University located at 1734 Telegraph Avenue.

== Transportation infrastructure ==
=== Mass transit ===
The 19th Street BART station is located beneath Oaksterdam on Broadway between 17th and 20th Streets. The station has entrances on Broadway and on a pedestrian plaza that opens onto Telegraph Avenue. AC Transit opened the Uptown regional transit center nearby on Thomas L. Berkley Way (20th Street) which has bus shelters with seating, NextBus arrival prediction signs and Rapid Bus service.

=== Bicycle rental ===
A bicycle rental service opened in the neighborhood on 15th Street. The bike shop also incorporates a glass-blowing school.

== Neighborhood retail ==
The district is home to a number of coffee shops, a tea shop, a hydroponic supply store, cafes, restaurants, a gift shop, two musical instrument stores, and specialty stores.

=== Medical cannabis dispensation ===
Since legislative changes were passed by the Oakland City Council in 2005, there is no longer a proliferation of cannabis dispensaries in the neighborhood. Most of these dispensaries had the chance to obtain non-profit status; however, some chose to remain for-profit and were therefore no longer permitted to dispense cannabis. Under current legislation, there are four officially permitted dispensaries in the City of Oakland. One of the four permits is held by a dispensary cafe in the neighborhood.

=== "Measure Z clubs" ===
"Measure Z" (as of 2014, Measure Z referred to a new Oakland public safety ballot measure) clubs are businesses that sell cannabis to people over the age of 18. One private club in Oaksterdam sells cannabis and food containing cannabis to adults who do not hold valid physician recommendations for medical marijuana which are needed to obtain county-issued patient identification cards in California. One such club is named after Oakland's Measure Z, a city ballot initiative, which makes the private sales, cultivation, and possession of cannabis the lowest police priority and mandates that the City of Oakland tax and regulate cannabis as soon as possible under state law.

== The Oaksterdam News ==
From 2005 to 2007, Oaksterdam University founder Richard Lee published the Oaksterdam News, a quarterly newsprint periodical covering news in the California cannabis movement, with a circulation of 100,000. In 2008, Lee founded West Coast Cannabis (edited by author and activist Ngaio Bealum), which covers similar news stories in a magazine format. Oaksterdam News editor, Chris Conrad, went on to found the West Coast Leaf, with his wife Mikki Norris, which ran with a circulation of 175,000 until 2013.

== See also ==
- Oakland Cannabis Buyers' Cooperative

=== Adjacent Oakland neighborhoods and attractions ===
- Adams Point
- Chinatown
- Downtown Oakland
- Jack London Square
- Lake Merritt
- Lakeside Apartments District
- Oakland City Center
- Old Oakland
- Uptown Oakland
