= West Coast Leaf =

The West Coast Leaf was an American newsprint periodical founded by cannabis activists Chris Conrad and Mikki Norris in 2007 and which ran quarterly until it was shuttered in 2013. Its founding was inspired by the Oaksterdam News, founded by activist Richard Lee, which provided cannabis-themed news to the California cannabis reform movement from 2005 to 2007. The West Coast Leaf grew in circulation to 175,000 and covered the entire west coast of the United States before transitioning in 2013 to an all-digital format at TheLeafOnline.com.
