= Old Oakland =

Coordinates: 37°48′3.85″N 122°16′25.98″W

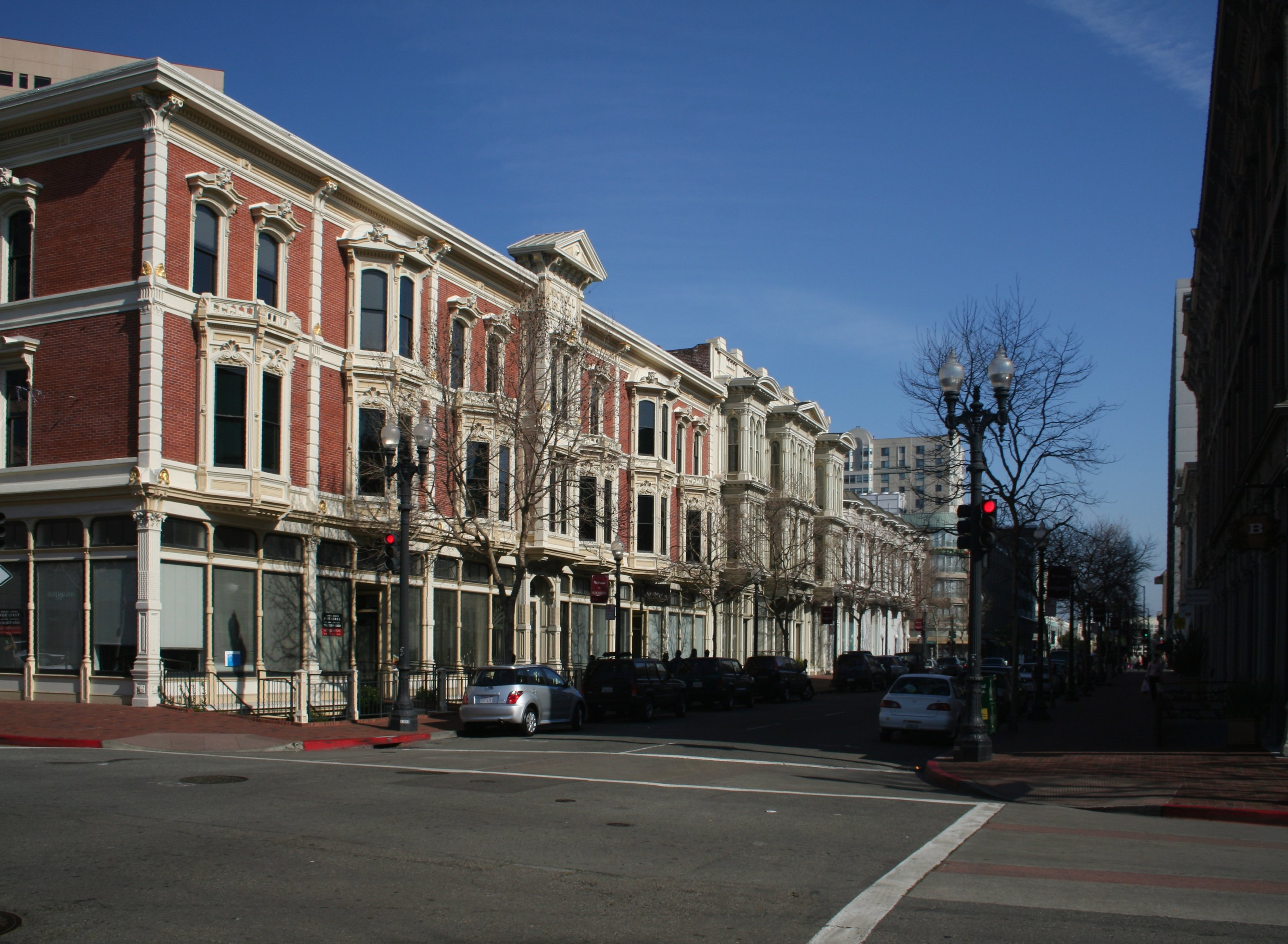
The Nicholl Block building on 9th and Washington Streets.

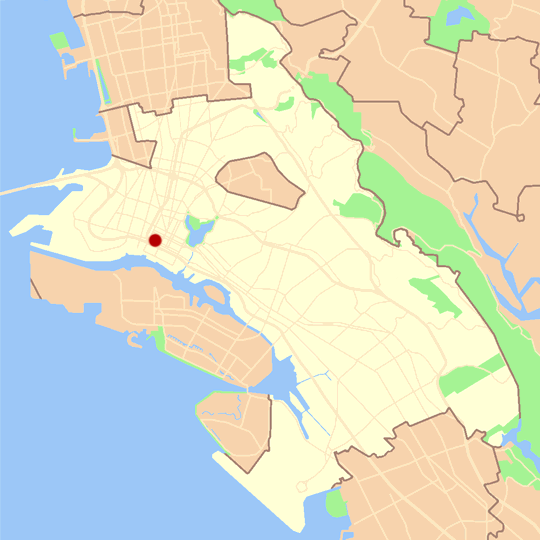
Location of Old Oakland in the City of Oakland.

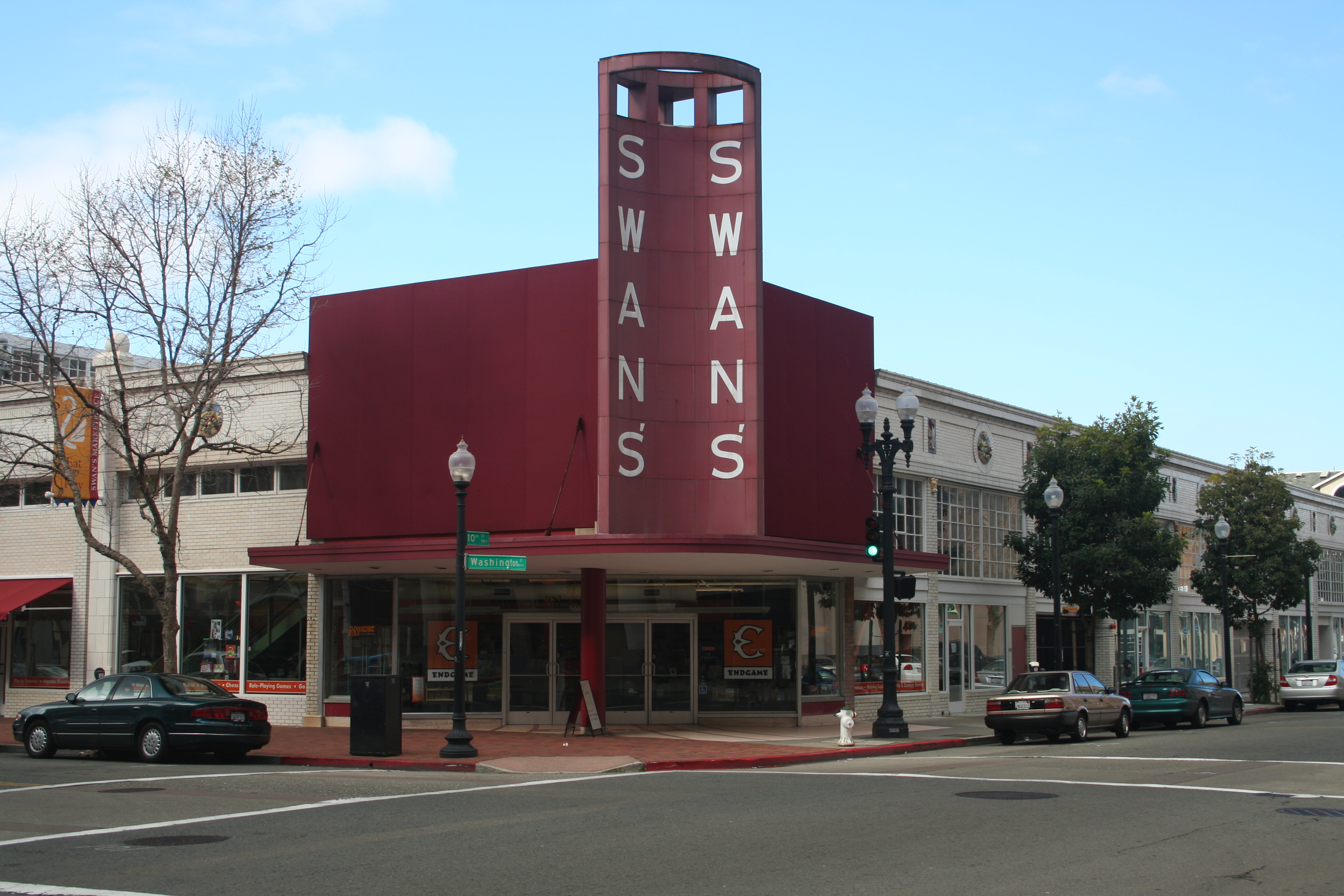
Swan's is an old marketplace now occupied by lofts and several businesses

Old Oakland is a historic district in downtown Oakland, California. The area is located on the northwest side of Broadway, between the City Center complex and the Jack London Square district, and across Broadway from Chinatown. Landmarks in the neighborhood include Swan's Market and the Leimert Building.

The Old Oakland district was the original downtown Oakland during the 1860s after Central Pacific Railroad constructed a terminus on 7th Street. By the 1870s, elegant brick Victorian hotels were being built in the blocks surrounding the railroad station to accommodate travelers. The ground floor of the hotels were designed as series of narrow shops so that pedestrians would pass by many of them just walking down the block. The architectural styles of the time featured tall, cast-iron columns and large plate-glass windows.

The downtown began its decline after the 1906 San Francisco earthquake, when the shopping district began moving to the blocks north of 14th.

In the 1970s and 1980s developers carefully rehabilitated and restored a block along 9th Street between Washington Street and Broadway, known as Victorian Row. Notable structures on Victorian Row include the 1878 Nicholl Block building.

In its early days, the Oakland Tribune rented a small office on 9th Street. A farmer's market is held every Friday on 9th Street.

In the 2000s, the neighborhood continued to become a downtown lifestyle district as more bistros and boutiques cropped up, more market-rate condominiums were constructed nearby, and as transit-oriented development retail and housing became more in demand. For example, Swan's Market (10th Street Market) is an indoor-outdoor market and gathering place with several restaurants, businesses, and nonprofits. The Museum of Art and Digital Entertainment moved there in 2022.

== See also ==
- Oakland Chinatown
- Jack London Square
- Lakeside Apartments District
- Oakland City Center
- Oaksterdam
- Uptown Oakland
