= Civic Center, Oakland, California =

Civic Center
- Neighborhood of Oakland
- Location within Oakland
- Coordinates: 37.800797°N 122.264872°W
- Country: United States
- State: California
- County: Alameda
- City: Oakland

Oakland's Civic Center neighborhood is a residential and public building district on the east side of Oakland's Central Business District. Its borders are roughly Downtown and Harrison Street to the west, the East Lake Neighborhood and Lakeshore Avenue to the east, the Lakeside Apartments District and 14th Street to the North, and Chinatown and 11th Street to the South.

== History ==
Since the era of Mayor Francis Mott and later under Mayor John Davie's administration from 1915–1931, various redevelopment plans have been proposed for the district. Davie was fond of the lake, and took to rowing there daily for recreation. Davie attempted to fulfill his original dream of a "Civic Center" at the south end of Lake Merritt. Dredging material was used to fill, and make usable for the project, nearly a 100 acres (400,000 m^{2}) of swampy land from 1st to 7th Streets and from Fallon Street to 5th Avenue. A new museum building was planned, along with an athletic center, an exhibition hall, an opera house, a symphony hall and other facilities.

Before the end of WWII, Oakland's City Manager at the time, Charles R. Schwanenberger, began raising hopes for renewed development in the district. Revised plans called for a new main public library, a central fire station, police administration building, and a new jail in the area. The long-delayed widening of the 12th Street dam, at the time a traffic bottleneck for motorists, destroyed the Gardens of the Oakland Auditorium, and dashed hopes for a Civic Center at that site. Following the war, a planning document for "Civic Center and Lake Merritt Improvement" was adopted as a part of the city's Master Plan. This plan called for more than a dozen public buildings to be grouped between Harrison and Fallon and between 14th and 10th Streets in a rectangle, continuing past the Oakland Auditorium and the School Administration Building on East 10th Street in a curve around the south end of Lake Merritt. A moratorium on new construction was imposed on the entire area pending development of the Civic Center, much to the chagrin of property owners.

Today parts of the plan have been realized on solid land on the west side of the lake, to include government office buildings, a courthouse, post office library, community college campus, and museum grounds.

== Residences ==
The district features the historic Hotel Oakland, now a senior residence, at its west end, and the 1920s Peralta Apartments on Jackson Street. The district also features 2–4 story mixed-use buildings at its southwest corner with apartments above ground-floor retail spaces.

== Public buildings ==
The district is heavily sprinkled with government buildings to include Oakland's historic Civic Center Post Office on the city block bounded by Alice, Jackson, 13th and 12th Streets, the federal Social Security Administration Building on Jackson Street, two Alameda County government office buildings, the Alameda County Law Library, Oakland's Main Library on 14th Street, The Alameda County Courthouse on Lake Merritt, Oakland's historic Fire Alarm Building on Oak Street, the Oakland Museum on 12th Street, and the Kaiser Convention Center anchoring the east end of the neighborhood near the 12th Street Dam.

A new use for the Kaiser Convention Center was proposed in 2006: a redevelopment designed to nucleate a cultural and educational district with the neighboring Oakland Museum of California and Laney College. In July 2006, the Oakland City Council approved a bond measure to expand the city's library system and convert the closed Center into a replacement for the city's aging main library, but Oakland voters defeated the library bond measure in the November 2006 election.

== 'Infill' parcels ==
The district is also heavily sprinkled with 'infill' parcels which have a variety of daily commercial use. Most are used as parking for the districts drive-in workforce, and nighttime bar and nightclub patrons. One is used as a preschool playground. One parcel at the Southeast corner of 12th and Jackson, which was formerly the site of a retail building, has been leveled, and the dirt lot is being reclaimed by nature as a Greenfield.

== Land development activity ==
In recent years, mid-rise, mixed-use condominium buildings have been planned and constructed on the edges of the district. Several high-rise mixed-use projects ranging from 10-40 stories in height, have been proposed by a variety of developers. Some are still active in various stages of the planning process.

=== 2001 Civic Center Cathedral proposal ===
In 2001, the Oakland Diocese of the Roman Catholic Church proposed a replacement for the St. Francis de Sales Cathedral, which was damaged in the 1989 earthquake and subsequently demolished. The diocese hired a Swiss architect who designed a grand cathedral featuring curving steel beams coming to a point some fifteen stories high. The diocese proposed situating the cathedral directly in front of the Kaiser Convention Center and surrounding it with a "grand plaza." The plaza would have been elevated, so that both the parking lot and adjacent roads would still have been usable, and it would have extended all the way to the edge of the lake.

Coalition of Advocates for Lake Merritt (CALM), an Oakland group proposed an alternative plan involving a remake of the 12th Street Dam halving the number of traffic lanes from six to three in each direction. The underpasses and overpasses were proposed to be eliminated, with stoplights installed where the road intersects with 12th Street and 1st Avenue. The beach was proposed to be widened, with a gently sloping lawn leading up to the roadway, new walking and bike paths in each direction. Crosswalks with pedestrian-activated stoplights were proposed to replace the tunnels under the freeway.

== See also ==
- Chinatown
- Jack London Square
- Lakeside Apartments District
- Oakland City Center
- Oaksterdam
- Uptown Oakland
