= Hemp Industries Association v. Drug Enforcement Administration =

Hemp Industries Association v. Drug Enforcement Administration, often shortened to HIA v. DEA, refers to two lawsuits concerning the legality of cannabis extracts and other products from the hemp plant that have very low or nonexistent natural THC levels, including CBD oil, in the United States. The first is from 2004 and the second is from 2018.

== 2004 case ==
In the 2004 case the 9th Circuit Court of Appeals established that the DEA had made illegal regulations intended to implement laws creating separate legal regimes for marijuana and THC. The court found the DEA's rules infringed upon legal trade in parts of the hemp plant exempted from regulation by Congress and against the will of Congress when Congress passed the marijuana and THC related legislation.

Specifically, the DEA chose to ban trade parts of the hemp plant legally exempted from the definition of "marihuana" by using THC related legislation. The THC legislation was passed without repealing the marijuana legislation superficially creating two contradictory legal regimes for the same substance. When the court looked into the history of the legislation, the court found Congress was attempting to ban synthetic THC which had recently been synthesized in a lab. Because Congress chose not to repeal the marijuana legislation with the exemptions, the court concluded that the natural plant was intended to be covered by the marijuana legislation and the synthetic lab derived THC was intended to be banned by the THC legislation.

The court further found that even if it regulation was legal, the DEA didn't follow the Congressionally mandated process for a federal agency to create regulations to implement laws so the regulations were struck down.

== 2018 case ==
In 2018 Hemp Industries Association alleged the DEA for created and was enforcing a similar regulation to the one that the ninth circuit court of appeals struck down in 2004. The parties reached a settlement in which the DEA would clarify the new regulation in light of certain Congressional Acts and the Ninth Circuit's previous ruling and distribute this statement to the public and its partner agencies that the plaintiff alleges were violating the 2004 ruling.

The plaintiff, Hemp Industries Association (HIA) claimed that CBD is not regulated by the Controlled Substances Act; the Drug Enforcement Administration took steps in December, 2016 to index "marihuana extract" as a substance under its purview, with code number 7350. Part of the legal challenge stipulates that the DEA's action contravenes the Agricultural Act of 2014 (also called the 2014 Farm Bill) which allows hemp farming under certain conditions. After the lawsuit was begun a public statement was released. It started "Because [of] recent public inquiries that DEA has received following the publication of the Final Rule suggest[ing] there may be some misunderstanding about the source of cannabinoids in the cannabis plant", the DEA issued a clarification of the code which stated it did not apply to products derived from "parts of the cannabis plant excluded from the CSA definition of marijuana, such as the flowering tops, resin, and leaves".

The 9th Circuit Court of Appeals heard the case in February, 2018. A number of members of the U.S. Congress filed an amicus brief supporting HIA.

The ruling did not invalidate the legality of hemp or hemp-derived CBD. In fact, it reinforced that the Farm Bill’s protections continue to override conflicting interpretations of the Controlled Substances Act (CSA). The court implied that the DEA's attempt to treat hemp-derived CBD as illegal was contrary to Congressional intent. Prominent industry advocates—including Hoban Law Group—used the ruling to clarify that hemp-derived CBD remains legal, so long as it complies with the Farm Bill's requirements.

Overall, while the lawsuit did not succeed procedurally, it indirectly reaffirmed the legal status of hemp-derived CBD and catalyzed regulatory clarity.
