= Kyle Kushman =

American writer

- Born: Adam Orenstein; Long Island, New York, USA
- Occupation(s): Writer, educator, cannabis cultivator

Kyle Kushman is the pen name of Adam Orenstein, an American writer.

He is known for his affiliation with High Times magazine. He is a former cultivation reporter for High Times Magazine, has been a contributing writer for over 20 years, and has taught courses in advanced horticulture at Oaksterdam University in Oakland, California and across the United States.

While a contributing writer for over 20 years, his collaborations earned multiple High Times Cannabis Cup awards, and he is credited with breeding Joey's Strain and Cherry Lopez.
