= Rachel Wolfe-Goldsmith =

American artist

- Born: January 13, 1991 (age 35)
- Occupations: Artist, creative director, muralist, NFT artist, curator
- Employer: Bay Area Mural Program
- Known for: Murals

Rachel Wolfe-Goldsmith (born January 13, 1991) is an American artist based in Oakland, California. She is known for her large-scale murals, and she is also the creative director of the Bay Area Mural Program.

== Works ==
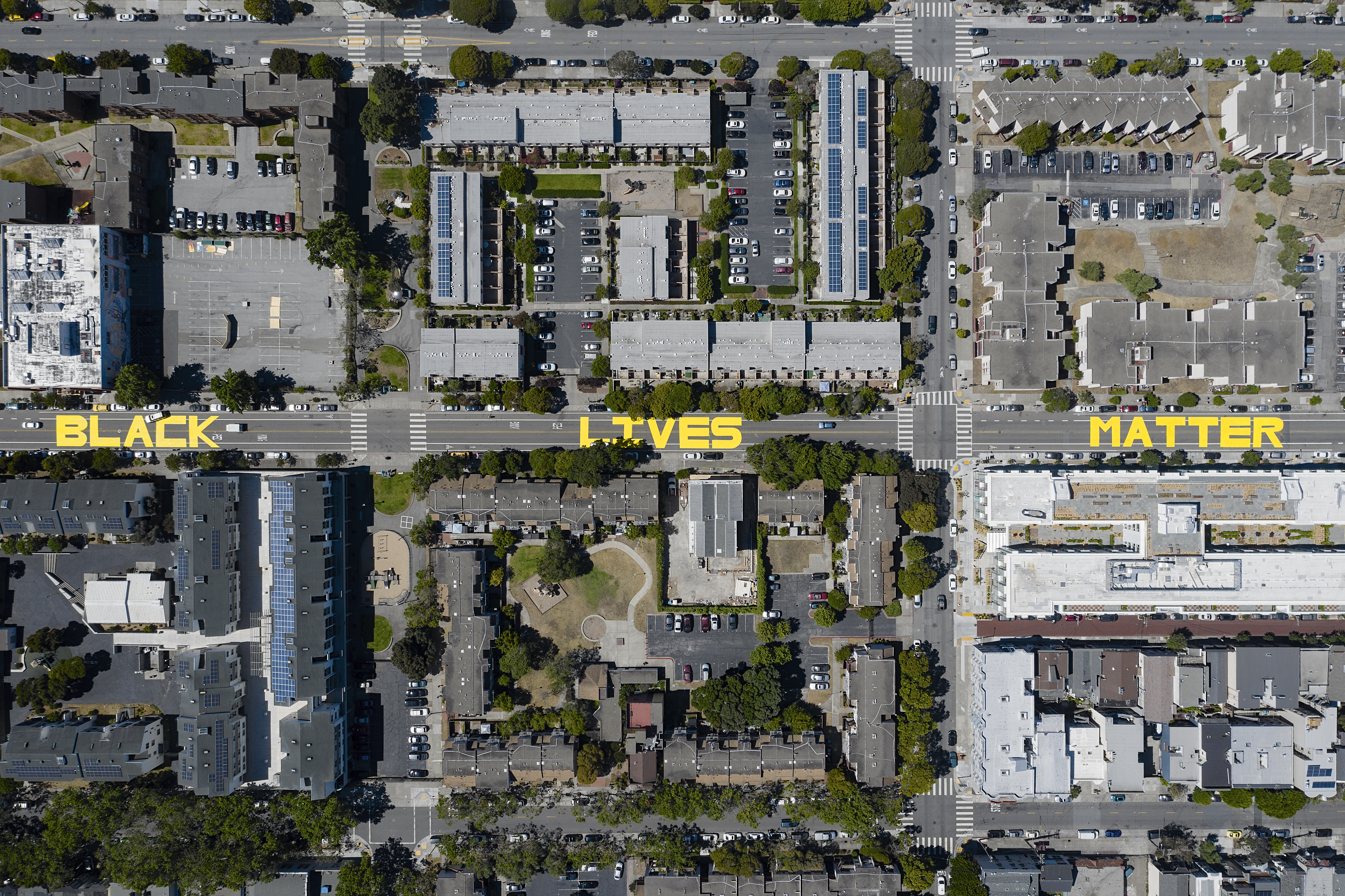
The Black Lives Matter mural in San Francisco done in part by Bay Area Mural Program

During the spring and summer of 2020, following the murder of George Floyd, Wolfe-Goldsmith was among the many artists who painted murals in response to the killing on pieces of plywood covering storefronts in downtown Oakland. Her piece on 15th St. is called We Can Breathe. During this time, the Bay Area Mural Program, with Wolfe-Goldsmith as creative director, and African American Arts & Culture Complex organized the Black Lives Matter mural in San Francisco, which ran for three city blocks.

The group She Will Rise, which is working to get a Black woman on the United States Supreme Court, commissioned Wolfe-Goldsmith to paint a mural in Washington, DC. Completed in October 2020, the work features Black women judges and activists.

In November 2020, it was announced that Wolfe-Goldsmith would be painting a mural focusing on social justice with fellow muralist Joshua Mays. The mural was commissioned by Kaiser Permanente and ABG Art Group, and was displayed outside of Kaiser's offices in downtown Oakland before a planned move to Liberation Park. Also in downtown Oakland, Wolfe-Goldsmith has painted a 3-story mural of artist Stoney Creation and model Yanni Brump.

In February 2021, West Oakland homeowner and curator Jilchristina Vest commissioned Wolfe-Goldsmith to paint a mural of women in the Black Panther Party on the side of her house at Center and 9th Streets. The 30-foot mural is based on several photographs taken by Stephen Shames and portrays Delores Henderson, Angie Johnson, Lauren Williams, and Williams's daughter Mary. The mural currently features the names of over 300 women, and is planned to be 2,000 square feet when completed. Black Panther leader Ericka Huggins was consulted on the project.
