= Carver Heights High School =

Former high school in Florida, United States

- Leesburg, Florida; United States

Information
- Established: 1954
- Closed: 1968

Carver Heights High School was a segregated public school for black students in Leesburg, Florida. It briefly served as the site of segregated Johnson Junior College as well. It was closed when the schools were integrated.

== History ==
=== Lake County Training School ===
In 1876, a school for black children began meeting in what is now St. Stephen AME church in Leesburg under the instruction of Reverend S.A. Williams. By 1882, the school had moved to the current location of the Mount Olive Progressive Baptist Church, then to another building off of Mike Street. Both buildings were destroyed by fire. After several moves, the community decided it was time to find a permanent location for the school, working alongside Lake County Schools to purchase land. The land was purchased on March 10, 1921, and the school was then named Lake County Training School. Lake County Training School was founded in 1922 with fewer than 100 students, and five faculty members. The first high school class graduated in 1933, and enrollment had increased to 300 students.

=== Carver Heights High School ===
In 1933, Lake County Schools purchased 36 acres for a new high school. In 1954 Carver Heights was opened at this new location, and continued to serve the community until 1968, when actions by the Federal courts forced white community leaders to allow black students to enter the same schools as white students. In 1962, Johnson Junior College was created simultaneously with what is now Lake-Sumter Community College, which was created for white students and initially located at Leesburg High School. Johnson was designated for black students, who met in the buildings of Carver Heights. All the black high school students were sent to Leesburg High School, and Carver Heights was repurposed as a middle school. When the black schools were merged, much of the black faculty was retained, often with reduced responsibilities.

== Athletics ==
The school participated as a member of the Florida Interscholastic Athletic Association. The team nickname was the Trojans.

== Notable people ==
- Loni Berry, educator and artist
