= I. Magnin Building =

Coordinates: 37.809189°N 122.268324°W

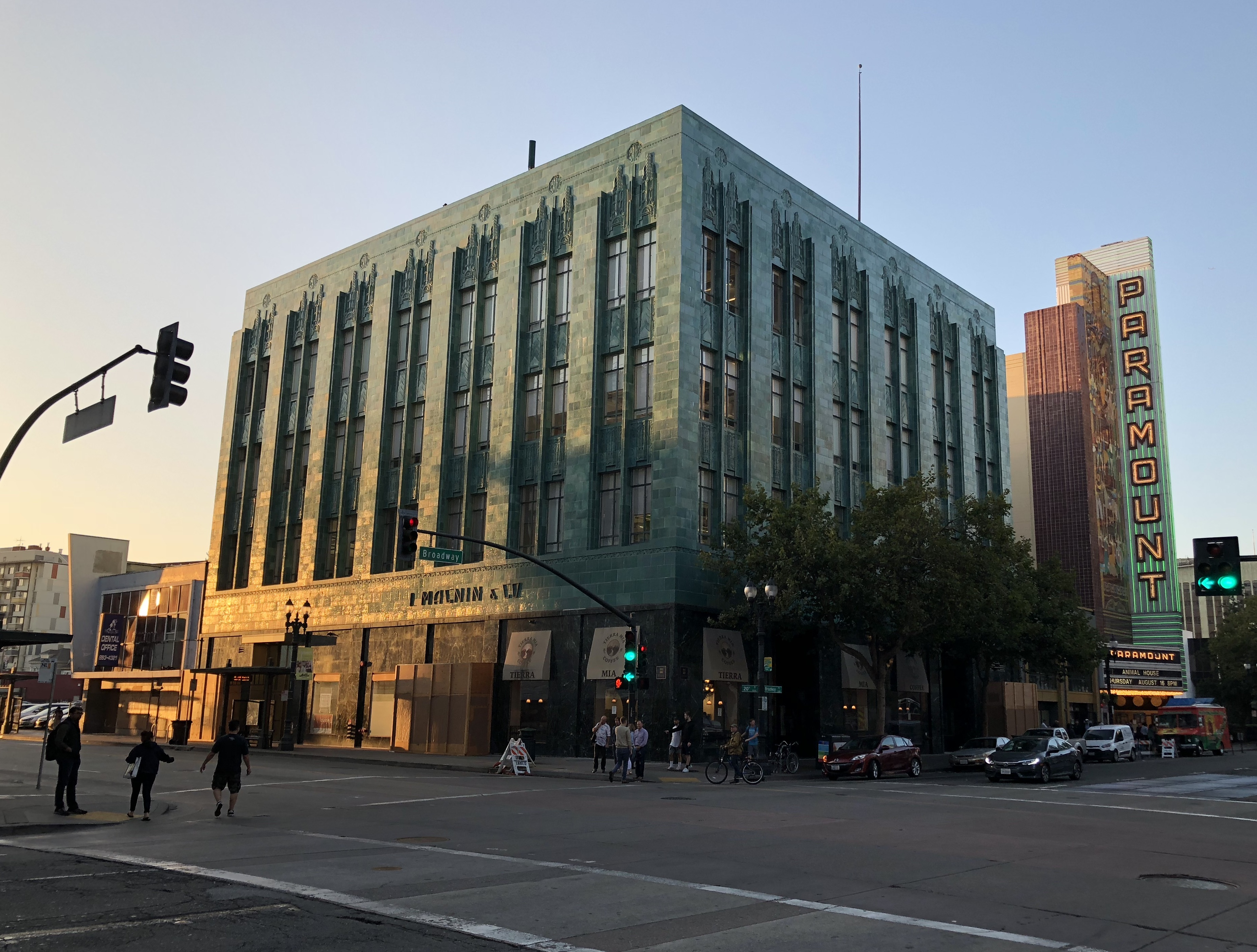
I. Magnin Building with the Paramount Theatre

The I. Magnin Building is a former I. Magnin department store in Oakland, California located at 2001 Broadway. It was built in 1931 and designed by architecture firm Weeks and Day. It housed the upscale department store until it closed in 1995. The building's green terra-cotta facade and art deco ornamentation make it a prominent landmark and a local visitor attraction in the Uptown neighborhood.

The building's interior was completely renovated in 2000, and it now houses retail and office businesses. It had more than 92% occupancy as of 2013. In 2016, Athen B Gallery arranged for Jet Martinez to paint a mural on the windowless rear wall of the building. Martinez painted lilies inspired by Mexican folk art.
