= Oakland School for the Arts =

Public secondary school in Oakland, California, United States

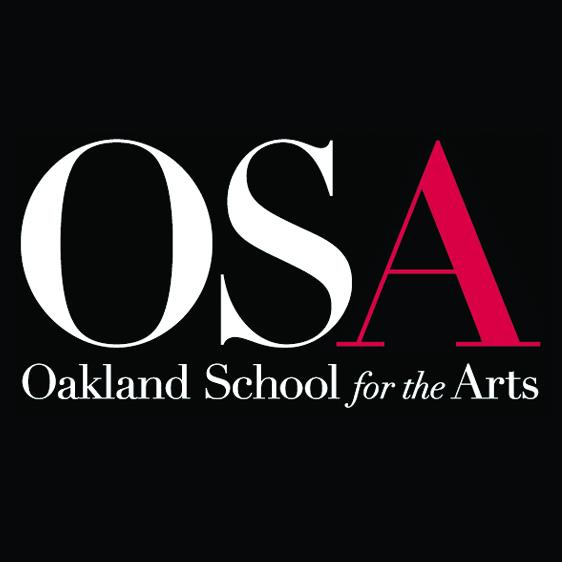

Location
- 530 18th Street; Oakland, California 94612-1512; United States
- 37°48′27.97″N 122°16′15.28″W

Information
- Other name: OSA
- Type: Public charter school
- Established: 2002
- Founder: Jerry Brown
- School district: Oakland Unified School District
- Director: Mike Oz
- Principal: Rachel Dalton
- Grades: 6–12
- Enrollment: 825 (2024–25)
- Campus type: Urban
- Mascot: Arty the fox
- Newspaper: OSA Telegraph
- Website: oakarts.org

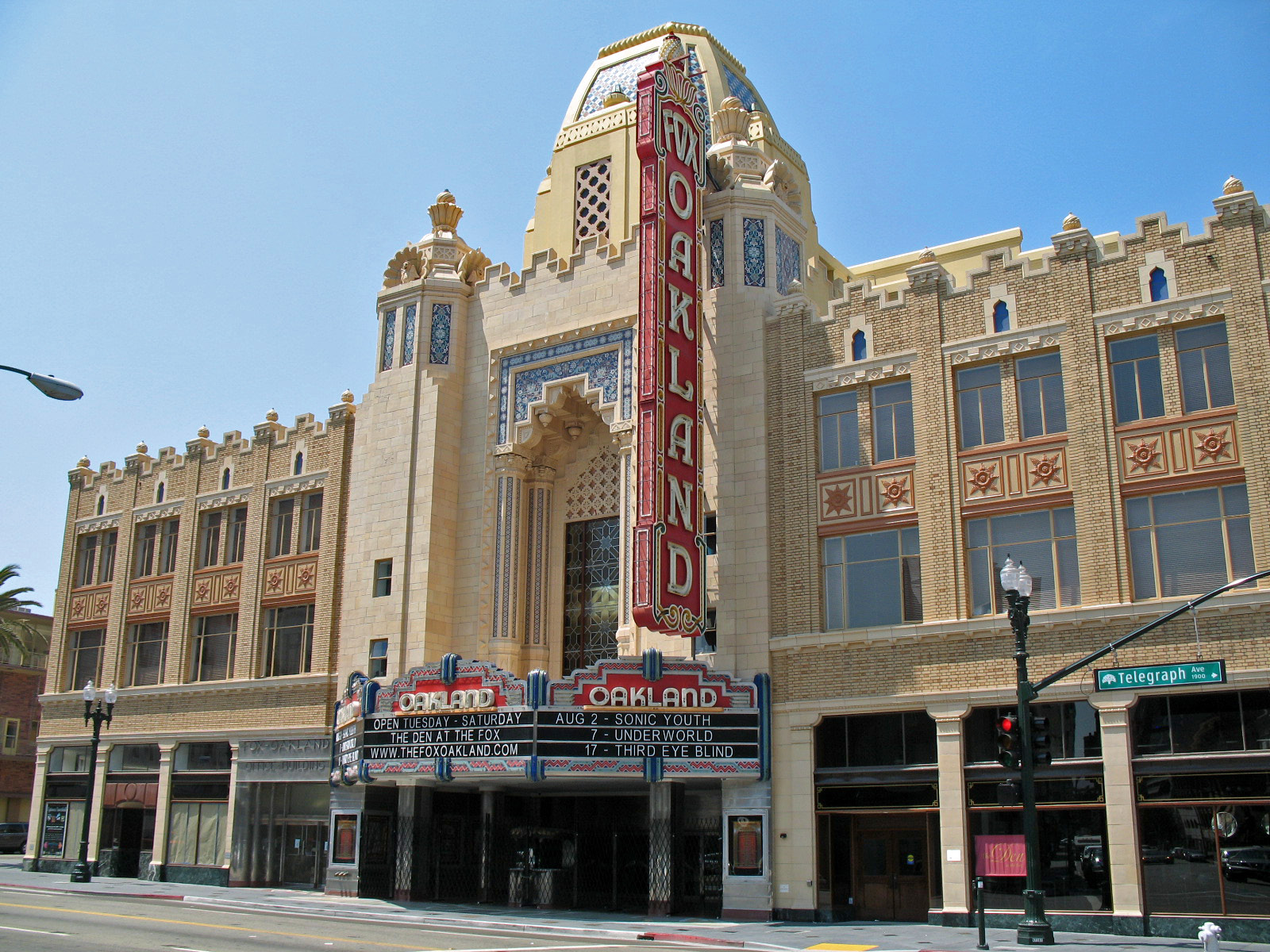
Fox Oakland Theatre building, OSA's main site

The Oakland School for the Arts (OSA) is a public non-profit secondary charter school with specialities in visual and performing arts in Oakland, California, United States. It opened in 2002 and encompasses middle school and high school, offering a curriculum that integrates college preparatory academics with conservatory-style arts training. It is a member of the Arts Schools Network and the National Association for College Admission Counseling.

The school's primary location is the building that also houses the Fox Oakland Theatre, at 530 18th Street at Telegraph Avenue in Uptown Oakland.

== History ==
Oakland School for the Arts was founded as a charter school in the Oakland Unified School District through the efforts of then Oakland Mayor Jerry Brown. It received 501(c)(3) nonprofit status in October 2001. The school opened its doors in September 2002 with a ninth-grade class and added another high school grade each subsequent year. A middle school was added in 2005. In the 2024–25 school year, OSA had 825 students enrolled in grades 6 through 12.

Loni Berry was the director of the school for the first four years, succeeded in the 2006–07 school year by Saul Drevitch. From 2007, Donn Harris was executive director and also artistic director. Since February 2022 the executive director is Mike Oz, who was previously the principal and succeeded Lisa Sherman-Colt.

OSA began with seven arts emphases: Theater, Dance, Literary Arts, Instrumental Music, Production Design, Visual Art, and Vocal Music. During the 2005–06 school year, Production Design was merged into Visual Arts. Faced with budget cuts in 2006, the school merged Theater, Arts Management, Literary Arts, and Visual Art and Design into one Theatre emphasis. In 2007, Literary Arts and Visual Art returned to separate emphases. In the early 2010s the school also offered a Circus Arts emphasis, which won awards, and a Figure Skating emphasis was introduced in 2013.

Admission was by audition until the 2021–22 school year, when admission by lottery was phased in. In 2010, 30% of applicants were accepted. Academic placement is based upon the student's prior preparation.

== Facilities ==
Oakland School for the Arts opened on Alice Street in the Civic Center neighborhood. It moved to temporary buildings behind the Fox Oakland Theatre in Uptown Oakland during the 2004–05 school year and in January 2009 moved into former office and retail space in the Fox Oakland Theater building itself, which it leases. The Fox Theatre had been closed for 30 years; its acquisition by the City of Oakland and reopening as a concert venue and school was part of an effort to revitalize the downtown area.

As its enrollment has grown, OSA has leased various additional spaces. These include the historic Sweet's Ballroom at 1933 Broadway, where the school became the master tenant in April 2014, and the former J.J. Newberry’s Five and Dime. In the 2020s it sought to add additional permanent space, including securing an agreement with the city to convert a vacant lot across the street from the Fox Theater into a park that would include facilities for soccer and basketball and a skate park and would accommodate physical education classes. In 2025 it announced it had signed a lease with agreed purchase price on the Dufwin Theater at 519 17th Street, to be used for dedicated arts spaces.

The school has its own record label, @1819records, and a campus radio station, KOSA.

== Academic performance and ranking ==
The first graduating senior class, the class of 2006, graduated with 100 percent of the class accepted to four-year colleges. High-school graduation and college enrollment rates have continued to rank high among San Francisco Bay Area public schools; in 2013, nearly 100 percent of seniors graduated and 95 percent enrolled in college.

In the 2002–2003 school year, OSA received a score of 8 out of 10 on the STAR (California Standardized Testing and Reporting Program) test, the highest in the school district, and in the 2003–2004 year, it received a 9, again the highest score in the district. While there was a significant drop in test scores during the 2005–06 school year, the school rebounded with improved scores for the 2006–2007 school year. On the state Academic Performance Index, OSA scored below the target 800 out of 1000 in its first decade, scoring 723 in 2009 for example, but its score rose from 786 in 2011 to 822 in 2012 and 837 in 2013. OSA was named a California Distinguished School in 2009 and 2021.

== Incidents and criticisms ==
Some of Jerry Brown's efforts to promote the school in its early years caused controversy. In March 2007, an electronic billboard with rotating ads was installed at the toll plaza on the Oakland side of the Bay Bridge, with some of the advertising revenue benefiting OSA and the Port of Oakland; the sign's dimmer malfunctioned and motorists complained that it impaired their vision at night, and people in the Oakland Hills and in San Francisco that its visibility at those distances was intrusive. The California Department of Transportation called for it to be turned off. Later in 2007, after becoming California Attorney General, Brown sent out letters to Oakland families inviting their children to apply to OSA, using his title and the state seal. Concerns were also raised after he became Governor of California over the propriety of his encouraging gifts to OSA as well as to another charter school he founded, Oakland Military Institute, from organizations and Indian tribes who were lobbying the state government. It was also noted that the millions that Brown raised for both schools made their students' education more expensive than at other Oakland schools without corresponding excellence in academic performance.

In 2021, OSA students spearheaded a movement by Oakland Unified School District students to demand better safeguards against and support for survivors of sexual assault and sexual harassment; they staged a one-day walkout on September 30 and 22 students alleged incidents as far back as the 2018–19 school year. There was conflict among students, including fights between some of those accused; OSA took disciplinary measures and hired an agency to investigate the claims. The investigation led to the firing and subsequent arrest of a longtime teacher on suspicion of having had sexual relations with a student, and to former staff and students describing "a culture that allowed for inappropriate relationships between staff and students" at the school in its early years. Charges were dropped against the teacher in March 2025 and he sued OSA and the investigative agency.

== Notable alumni ==
- Sasha Berliner, jazz vibraphonist
- Kriesha Chu, singer
- Angus Cloud, actor
- Tati Gabrielle, actress
- Kehlani, musician, singer, songwriter, dancer
- Alysa Liu, figure skater
- Adrian Marcel, singer, songwriter
- Leila Mottley, author
- Ari'el Stachel, actor
- Zendaya, actress, singer
