= Sasha Berliner =

American vibraphonist and composer (born 1998)

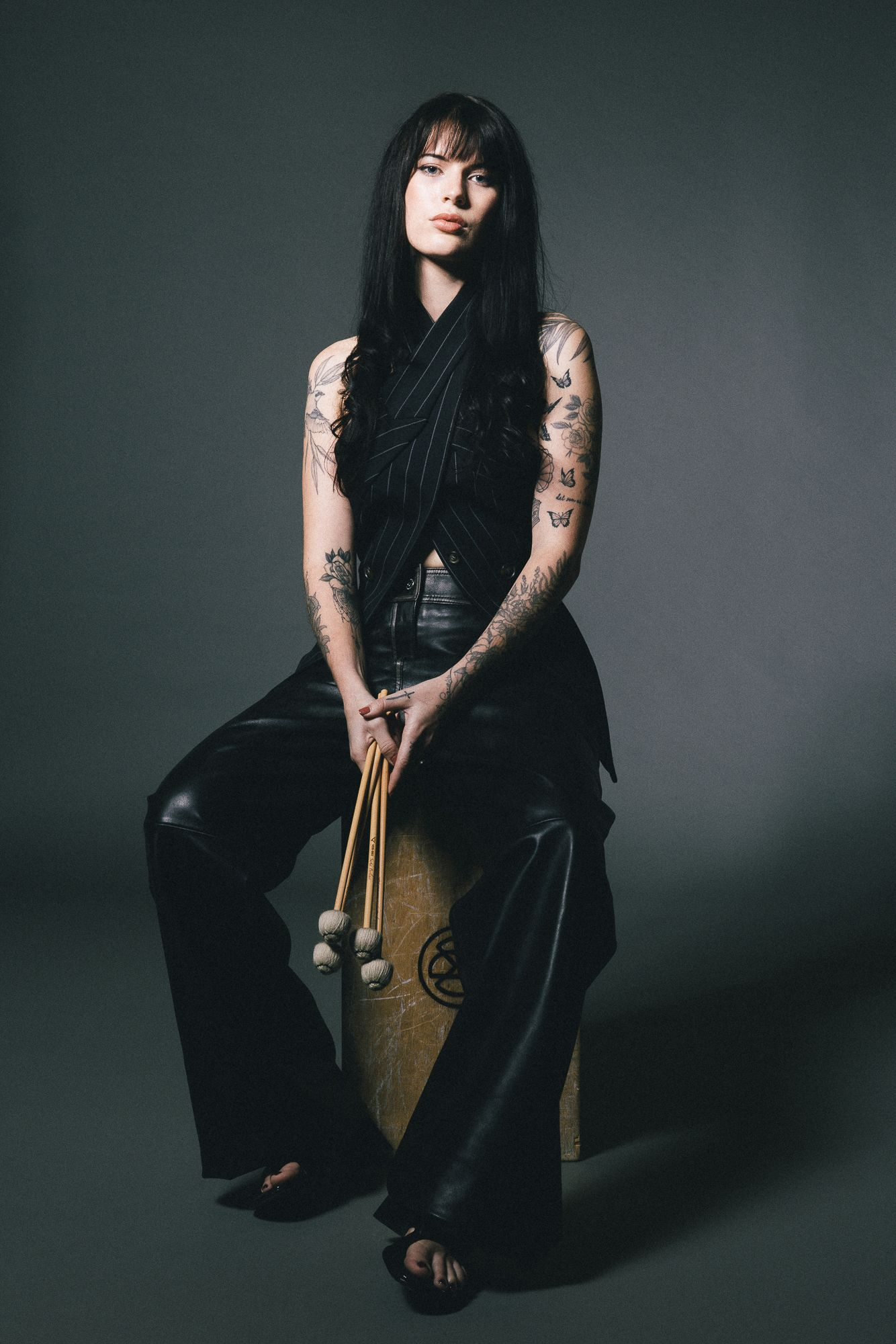

Background information
- Born: June 20, 1998 (age 28); San Francisco, California, U.S.
- Genres: Jazz, avant-garde jazz, experimental, rock
- Occupations: Composer, musician, educator
- Instruments: Vibraphone, drums
- Years active: 2015-present
- Label: JMI
- Website: sashaberlinermusic.com

Sasha Berliner (born June 20, 1998) is an American vibraphonist and composer.

== Early life ==
Berliner was born in San Francisco and grew up in the Bay Area, where she began playing drums at age 8. In her earlier years, Berliner was more focused on rock and indie music, and she participated in the San Francisco Rock Project (formerly the San Francisco School of Rock) along with her entire family: her father, John Berliner, is a bassist on the school's board of directors; her mother, Sheri Evans, was the school office manager; and Berliner and her brother, Cole, played in the school's House Band for a number of years.

In 2011, at the age of 13, Berliner auditioned for the Oakland School for the Arts, but was told they already had too many drummers. The school asked if she would be interested in playing the vibraphone instead, and she agreed without knowing what instrument it was. Despite her initial confusion, she found the vibraphone spoke to her investments in harmony and melody, and she quickly became invested in pursuing it professionally, choosing the school's jazz track. As a teenager, she continued working in a number of genres as a singer and multi-instrumentalist, and in 2013 arranged a version of Beck's "Please Leave a Light On When You Go" from Song Reader for the San Francisco Rock Project; she also ran a fashion blog, in part inspired by her mother's work running a boutique in San Francisco.

== Education and career ==
Berliner joined the SFJAZZ High School All-Stars as a junior, and recorded her EP Gold at age 16. She graduated from high school in 2016 and moved to New York City to attend The New School for Jazz and Contemporary Music.

In 2017, she attended the Banff International Workshop in Jazz and Creative Music, then led by composers Vijay Iyer and Tyshawn Sorey; Sorey invited Berliner to join his newest sextet the following year.

Berliner says the higher-than-usual number of women musicians at Banff and the women faculty's increased transparency about harassment inspired her to speak out about gender-based mistreatment. Shortly after returning from the workshop, in late September of 2017, she published an open letter on her experiences and observations of sexism in the jazz community. The letter began spreading rapidly just a few weeks before the #MeToo hashtag went viral, leading to heightened media attention to issues of workplace harassment and assault.

Then a 19-year-old college sophomore, Berliner was invited to perform as "one of the youngest bandleaders" at the 2018 NYC Winter Jazzfest, and in the following months, her letter received wide coverage in publications including The New York Times Hot House Jazz Magazine, and PBS NewsHour. SFJAZZ Magazine named her one of "10 Rising Women Instrumentalists You Should Know",

In January 2019, she was announced as the LetterOne "Rising Stars" Jazz Award's North American recipient for 2018; the prize was a seven-city tour of North America, including dates at jazz festivals in Canada and the United States. Later in 2019, she signed as an artist with Vater Percussion and Marimba One and released her first full-length record, Azalea.

Berliner has played with artists including Nicholas Payton, Quincy Davis, Christian McBride, Cecile McLorin Salvant, Justin Brown, and Warren Wolf, as well as solo and in her own groups. She was named in DownBeat's Critics Poll in 2020 (as "Rising Star" vibraphonist) and 2022, and the DownBeat Readers Poll for 2019, 2020, 2021, and 2022.

She released her second full-length, Onyx, in 2022 with J.M.I. Recordings. She also has a live album, Sasha Berliner and Tabula Rasa, from her residency at the SWR New Jazz Meeting 2021, which was recorded at her concert at Alte Feherwache in Mannheim, Germany for Enjoy Jazz Festival.

Her third studio album, entitled "Fantome", was released in 2025 on Outside In Music.

== Discography ==
=== As leader ===
Year	Artist	Title	Label	Additional Personnel
2019	Sasha Berliner	Azalea	self-released	Morgan Guerin, Kanoa Mendenhall, Chris McCarthy, Jongkuk Kim, Lucas Saur, Leonor Falcon Pasquali, Tippan Phasuk
2022	Sasha Berliner	Onyx	J.M.I. Recordings	Marcus Gilmore, Burniss Travis II, James Francies, Jaleel Shaw, Julius Rodriguez, Thana Alexa
2023	Sasha Berliner, Kalia Vandever, Matt Sewell, Max Gerl & Michael Shekwoaga Ode	Sasha Berliner and Tabula Rasa (live at Enjoy Jazz Festival with SWR New Jazz Meeting 2021)	Naxos Deutschland GmbH	Kalia Vandever, Matt Sewell, Max Gerl & Michael Shekwoaga Ode

=== As side person ===
Year	Artist	Title	Label
2020	Tyshawn Sorey	Unfiltered	self-released
2023	Nabate Isles	En Motion	Ropeadope
2023	Kaisa's Machine	Taking Shape	Greenleaf
