= Paul Armentano =

American cannabis activist

Paul Armentano is an American cannabis activist. He is the deputy director of the National Organization for the Reform of Marijuana Laws (NORML). He is also a faculty member at Oaksterdam University in Oakland, where he serves as chair of science.

His writing on cannabis and cannabis policy has appeared in over 1,000 publications, scholarly and/or peer-reviewed journals, as well as in more than two dozen textbooks and anthologies. He is a regulator contributor to The Hill newspaper as well as to numerous other print and online publications. Armentano is the co-author of the book Marijuana is Safer: So Why Are We Driving People to Drink? (2009, Chelsea Green), which has been licensed and translated internationally. He is also the author of the book The Citizen’s Guide to State-By-State Marijuana Laws (2015), available from Whitman Publishing. He is the author and editor of the NORML-produced publication Emerging Clinical Applications for Cannabis and Cannabinoids, which summarizes over 400 peer-reviewed studies specific to the safety and efficacy of cannabis among different patient populations.

Armentano was the principal investigator for defense counsel in the federal case US v Schweder et al., one of the first legal cases in decades to challenge the constitutionality of cannabis as a schedule I controlled substance. He was also an expert in the successful Canadian constitutional challenge, Allard v Canada, which preserved qualified patients right to grow cannabis at home.

He is the 2013 Freedom Law School Health Freedom Champion of the Year and the 2013 Alfred R. Lindesmith award recipient in the achievement in the field of scholarship. He is the 2019 Al Horn Memorial Award recipient in appreciation of advancing the cause of justice.

Armentano works closely with numerous state and federal politicians with regard to drafting and enacting marijuana policy reforms, and he is a frequently sought speaker on the topic at legal and academic seminars.
