= Uptown Oakland =

Uptown
- Neighborhood of Oakland
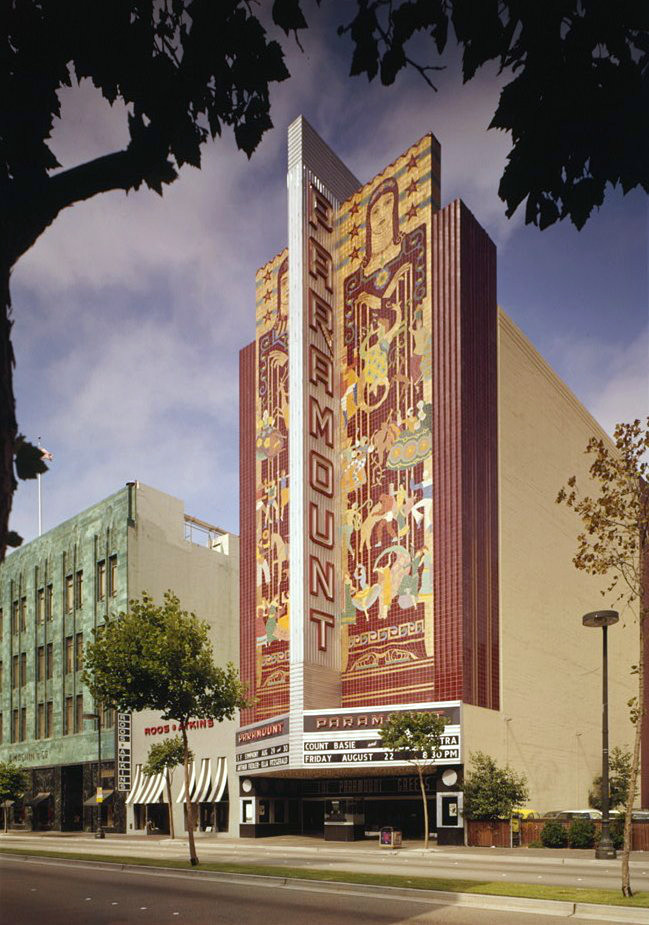
- The Paramount Theatre and I. Magnin Building on Broadway

- Location within Oakland
- Coordinates: 37.809378°N 122.270708°W
- Country: United States
- State: California
- County: Alameda
- City: Oakland

Uptown Oakland is a neighborhood in Oakland, California, United States, located in the northern end of Downtown. It is located roughly between West Grand Avenue to the north, Interstate 980 to the west, City Center and 14th Street to the south, and Broadway to the east. The neighborhood has become an important entertainment district in recent years.

== History ==
The area near 20th Street and Broadway had been Oakland's main shopping district in the mid-20th century. Several buildings from that era remain, including the former H.C. Capwell department store, which later became Sears and is currently being developed into a mixed-use retail and office building called "Uptown Station;" the I. Magnin department store; the Paramount Theater; and the Fox Oakland Theatre. The Payless Drug Store and Market located at Telegraph Ave. and 20th St, housed the drug store small produce markets and seafood sellers. It included a SAAG's sausage counter and even a USO branch. This structure was demolished in the early 1960s to construct a parking structure for Capwell's Department store. The area was home to one of the original Kwik Way hamburger outlets and also at Broadway and Grand Ave the Oakland branch of Breuners furniture.

West of Telegraph Avenue, the neighborhood was for many years largely made up of parking lots and garages. The area has gone through several failed urban renewal projects and proposals, including proposals for a shopping mall, an entertainment district, high-rise housing, and a professional baseball stadium. The area now contains several attractive high-rise apartment buildings.

== Development ==
During Jerry Brown's time as Mayor (1999-2007) The Uptown District was deemed the Entertainment center of the city. Redevelopment has taken place by large upscale apartments and restaurants, bringing some much needed money and foot traffic into the area. The centerpiece has been the city government's 10K program, an effort to bring 10,000 additional residents to the downtown area. The largest of the new apartment complexes is a five-story, three-building apartment complex called "The Uptown" built by Forest City Enterprises, including a new dog-friendly park called Fox Square. A new surface street, Rashida Muhammad Street, was named after the late community activist who died of lung cancer in 2006. Alice Walker immortalized Rashida Muhammad's (aka Dessie X. Woods) story in her collection of essays Living by the Word. The street was built with the stated goal of The Uptown project of enhancing and building a new community in the area. This complex also features the "Remember Them" sculpture by Mario Chiodo, a local artist. The sculpture, when it is complete, will be one of the largest bronze sculptures in the United States. The 25 humanitarians honored in this sculpture include Oskar Schindler, Maya Angelou, Ruby Bridges, Cesar Chavez, Thich Nhat Hanh, and Mother Teresa.

Numerous bars and restaurants have opened between 16th Street and Grand Avenue. Retail continues to add to the landscape of the Uptown District.

In addition to becoming a nightlife destination for East Bay residents, the area has developed well culturally overall. The area now includes many cafes, bakeries, and galleries, as well as being a central hub for the other bars and restaurants located in the surrounding neighborhoods.

== Points of interest ==
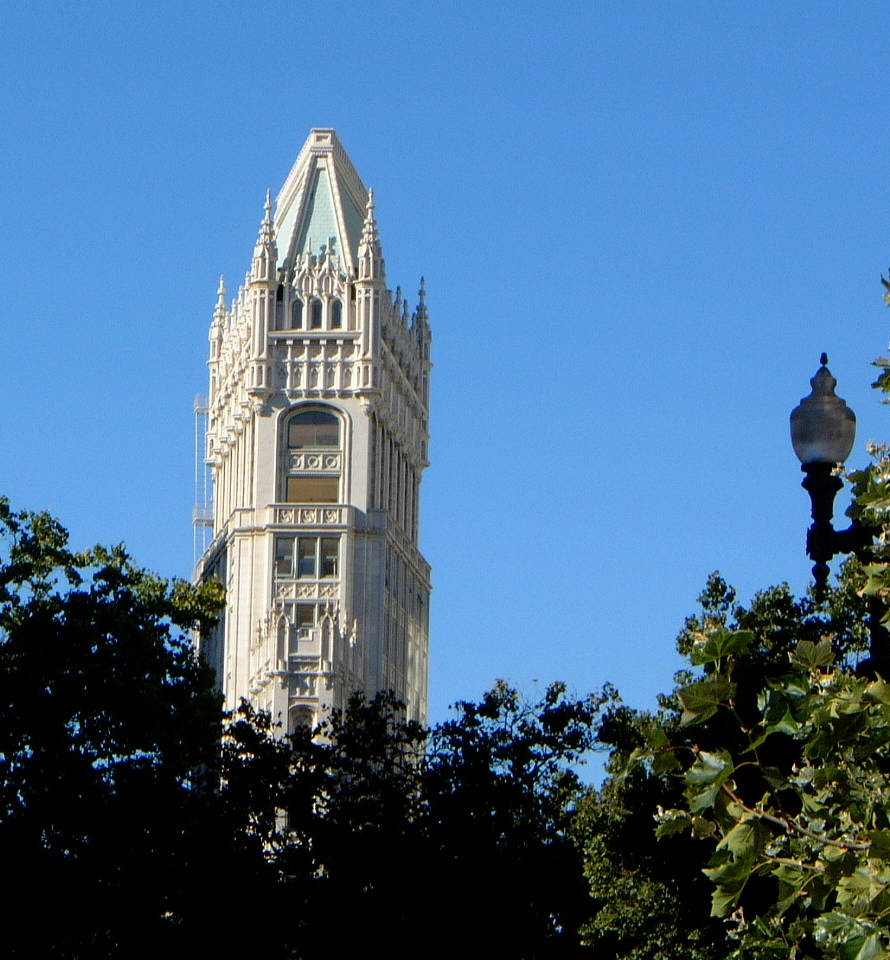
Cathedral Building

=== Architectural landmarks ===
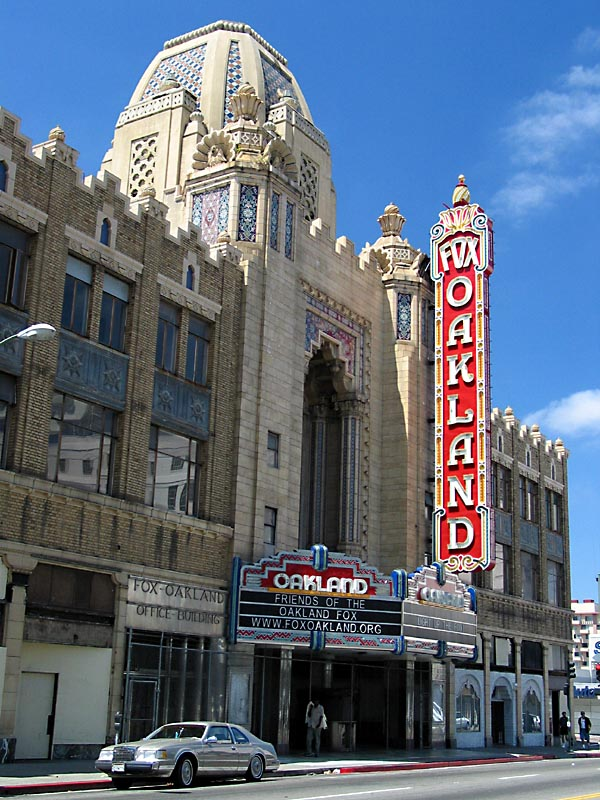
Fox Oakland Theatre

The tallest building, just at the City Center border of the Uptown district, is the 40-floor high-rise apartment building, “Atlas;” at 400 feet high, it is the second tallest building in all of Oakland. The second tallest building in the Uptown district is the 380-foot-tall 34-floor high-rise apartment building, "17th & Broadway." The third tallest is the Gothic Revival Cathedral Building.

Uptown includes a number of classic Art Deco buildings, although some are now in disrepair. These include:

- The Paramount Theatre is a massive movie theater. When it was built in 1931, it was the largest multi-purpose theater on the West Coast, seating 3,476. Today, the Paramount is the home of the Oakland East Bay Symphony and the Oakland Ballet. It regularly plays host to R&B, jazz, blues, pop, rock, gospel, classical music, as well as ballets, plays, stand-up comedy, lecture series, special events, and re-runs of classical movies from Hollywood's Golden Era.
- Near the Paramount is the green terracotta 1931 I. Magnin Building, a former department store that is now office and retail space.
- The Fox Oakland Theatre is a 3,800-seat former movie theater, located at 1807 Telegraph Avenue. The theater was designed by Weeks and Day, is listed on the National Register of Historic Places, and reopened on February 5, 2009 after extensive renovation. In addition to being a major live music venue, the building houses the Oakland School for the Arts.
- The May Bowles Building at 1718 Telegraph Avenue was designed by Douglas Dacre Stone and features a blue-green terracotta frieze, and geometric window screens.
- The Oakland Floral Depot on Telegraph Avenue at 19th Street features an extensive cobalt blue and silver terracotta frieze with geometric and floral motifs. It was designed by Albert J. Evers and built in 1931. It originally functioned as a flower shop. J.J. Newberry was later a tenant. The building now houses The Uptown nightclub and the Flora restaurant.
  - The space above Newberrys housed Sweets Ballroom venue which hosted many big bands and jazz greats from the '30s through the '60s. Some of the performers were Duke Ellington, Cab Calloway, Ella Fitzgerald, Jimmie Lunceford and many others. The ballroom was locally owned by the Sweet family for the whole period.
- At 1955 Broadway is the former H.C. Capwell department store, which was owned by The Emporium. It was designed by architect Ernest Alan Van Vleck and opened in 1929. The building eventually became a Sears store, but closed in 2014. The building was bought by Uber in 2015 and was branded as "Uptown Station." Uber then sold the building to a developer, and in December 2018, Square leased the building with plans to move 300-500 employees there in late 2019.

=== Murals ===
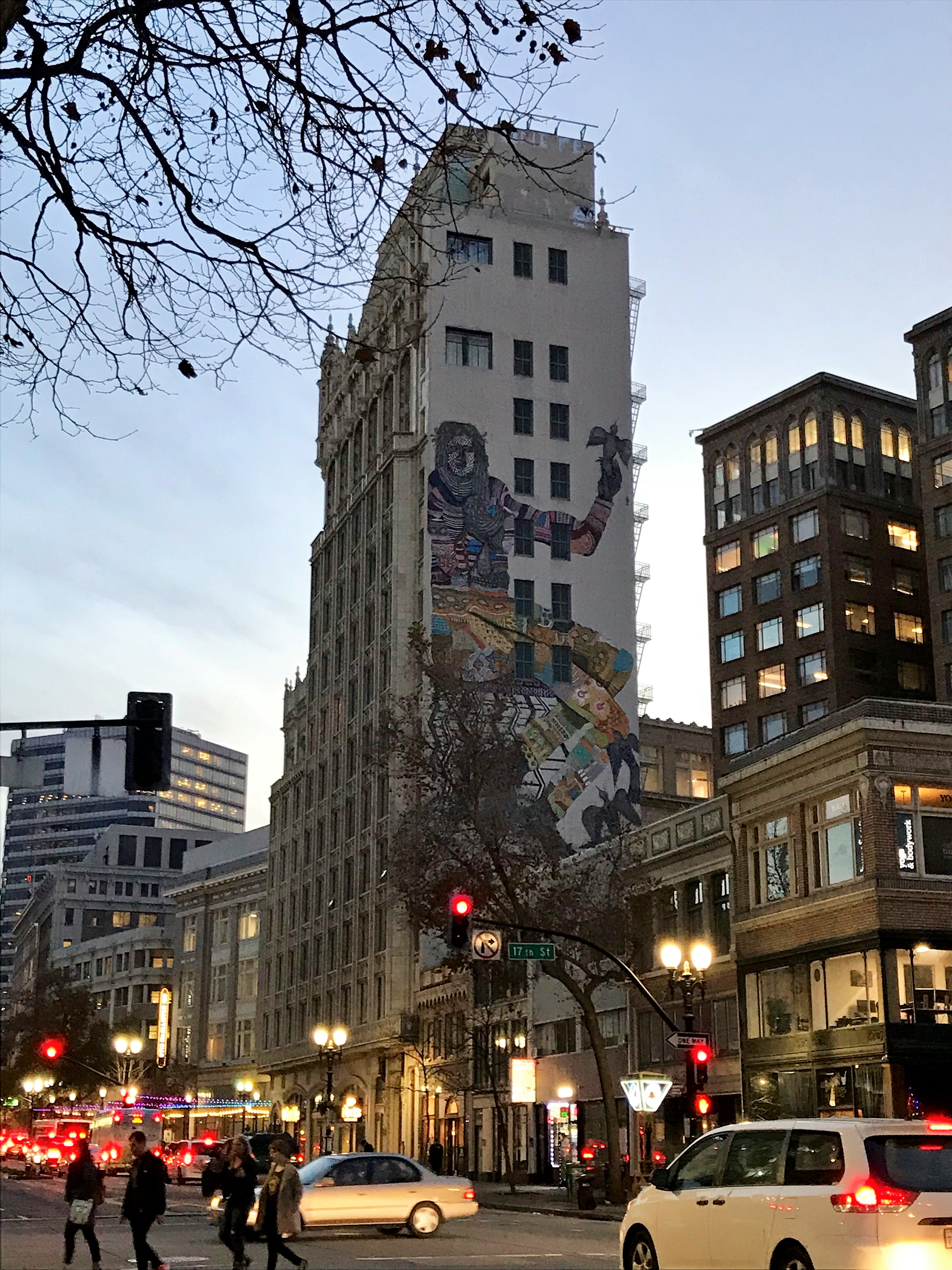
The Zio Ziegler mural on the back of the Cathedral Building

Uptown Oakland has many murals. These include:

- The Oakland Palestine Solidarity mural by various artists on 26th Street between Telegraph Avenue and Broadway
- Lilies mural, 2016, by Jet Martinez of Athen B Gallery on the back of the I. Magnin Building at 2001 Broadway
- Beacon: Frequency Reader, 2017, by Joshua Mays of Athen B Gallery at 1700 Broadway
- United Nations 70th Anniversary mural, 2015, by Zio Ziegler of Athen B Gallery on the back of the Cathedral Building at 1615 Broadway
- Murals on former PG&E building by Max Kauffman of LeQueVive Gallery on Thomas L. Berkley Way at Telegraph Avenue
- I am human through the reflection of your humanity back at me, 2016, by Ricky Lee Gordon of Athen B Gallery on 2123 Franklin St.
- Water Writes, 2011, by various artists and volunteers with the Estria Foundation on 21st Street between Broadway and Franklin
- Stephen Curry commemorative mural, 2022, by Andre Jones of Bay Area Mural Program along Oakland YMCA at 2350 Broadway

== Transportation ==
The 19th Street Oakland BART station is in Uptown, in a subway under Broadway. Oakland's Art Moderne Greyhound bus depot is on the other side of the neighborhood, on San Pablo Avenue at Interstate 980. AC Transit operates the Uptown Transit Center and numerous local buses, including a free weekday shuttle called "The B" that connects the Uptown district with Old Oakland, Chinatown, City Center, Lake Merritt, and Jack London Square.

== See also ==
- Temescal
- Adams Point
- Chinatown
- Jack London Square
- Lakeside Apartments District
- Oakland City Center
- Oaksterdam
- Old Oakland
