= Loni Berry =

American theatre educator

- Loni Berry in November 2014
- Born: November 26, 1954 (age 71); Clifton Forge, Virginia, USA

Loni Berry (born November 16, 1954) is a theatre educator/artist. He has taught at numerous universities and is Artistic Director of Culture Collective Studio, a theatre production company in Bangkok, Thailand.

== Biography ==
Loni Berry was born November 16, 1954, in Clifton Forge, Virginia, to Lonzia James Berry and Agnes Stevens. He grew up in Leesburg, Florida and attended Carver Heights High School and Leesburg Senior High School. He was an All-State musician (clarinet, oboe and piano) and was active in student government and lieutenant governor of Key Club.

Berry attended Brown University where he studied Biology and Music, receiving an AB degree in 1976. He moved to New York and began a career as a pianist/music director - primarily as music director to then Dreamgirl Loretta Devine. His concert and cabaret work with various Broadway actors piqued his interest which led to work at the Mirror Repertory Theatre and the American Place Theatre.

He returned to Brown to study Performing Arts with George Houston Bass, John Emigh and Paula Vogel. His academic focus was American Minstrelsy and he directed the first college production of George C. Wolfe’s The Colored Museum which won him best director in the American College Theatre Festival and performances at the Kennedy Center in Washington, D.C. He began his work as a playwright with George Houston Bass, executor of the Langston Hughes estate, writing his first play …Love, Langston, a collage of Langston’s Hughes’ works set to original music.

After receiving an AM from Brown in 1989, he studied directing at the Yale School of Drama with Lloyd Richards, Earle Gister and August Wilson. His thesis production was an original musical, Tom’s Suite, based on Uncle Tom’s Cabin. Graduating from Yale in 1992, he received a Theatre Communications Group/National Endowment for the Arts Director Fellowship, which allowed him to study with various international theatre directors, including Anne Bogart, Lee Breuer, Peter Minshall, Tadashi Suzuki and George C. Wolfe.

Berry began his teaching career at Williams College in 1992. He has since taught at Smith College, University of California, San Diego and received tenure at California State University San Marcos. Throughout his time as a professor, he directed over 50 plays and has trained such artists as Michael Bakkensen, Quincy Tyler Bernstine, Marsha Stephanie Blake, Melody Butiu, Chris Butler, Ricardo Chavira, Maria Dizzia, Mary Catherine Garrison, Brian Sgambati and Jonathan Silverstein.

In 1995, Berry returned to Brown University to direct an original musical comedy entitled Brer Rabbit at Rites & Reason Theatre. The play was also produced at The National Black Theater Festival (NC). As a professional director, he has served as Artist in Residence at Seattle Repertory Theatre, and his work has been produced at The Public Theatre (NY), The Hartford Stage Company, California Center for the Arts-Escondido, and Great Lakes Theater Festival (Cleveland).

In 2000, Berry accepted a position with California Governor Jerry Brown, (then Mayor of Oakland), as founding director of Oakland School for the Arts. During the six years there, Berry created and implemented the school’s unique interdisciplinary curriculum and developed the school from grades 7 through 12.

In 2006, Berry relocated to Bangkok, Thailand where he taught at Redeemer International School and Mahidol University. In 2015, he teamed with Saratsa Sasitvirarom, Caitlin Haas, and Kelly B. Jones to create Culture Collective Studio, a professional English language theatre, where he serves as artistic director. Berry is also associate professor at Suan Sunandha Rajahit University School for the Arts.

== Sources ==
- M. Brasch, Walter (2000). Brer Rabbit, Uncle Remus, and the 'Cornfield Journalist': The Tale of Joel Chandler Harris. Mercer University Press; 1st edition. ISBN -0865546967.
