= Joshua Mays =

American muralist (born c. 1976)

- Born: Denver, Colorado
- Occupation: Artist
- Known for: Murals

Joshua Mays (born c. 1976) is an American painter, illustrator, and muralist. His work, which typically features Black subjects in fantastical settings, is considered by many to be an example of Afrofuturism, although he does not use the label to describe himself. Mays was born in Denver, Colorado, and he is based in Oakland, California.

== Work ==
Mays is self-taught and sold his first commissioned piece in high school. He names album cover artist Mati Klarwein as an influence, and he has done album art for Jneiro Jarel and Jill Scott.

Mays's murals include the "BEACON" series, which is based on a quote by Maya Angelou: “If one is lucky, a solitary fantasy can totally transform one million realities.” This series consists of murals in Oakland at 23rd Avenue and 24th Street, 829 Vermont St., West Oakland, and 1700 Broadway. The piece at 1700 Broadway is called Beacon Frequency Reader and is one of the city's largest murals. Its subject is a girl with a staff, who is surrounded by birds. Mays is quoted as says the girl is a "gatekeeper to a fantastical realm." The mural's installation was arranged by curator Sorell Raino-Tsui, who negotiated the installations of other large murals in Oakland's Uptown neighborhood.

Joshua Mays and King Britt, working with Mural Arts Philadelphia, created an "augmented reality mural" at 5300 Lansdowne Ave in 2018. The piece, Dreams, Diaspora and Destiny, included a mural by Mays and Mural Arts Philadelphia, music by Britt, and a mobile app for viewers. Other locations where he has painted murals include Johannesburg, Mexico City and Jakarta.

In 2018, San Francisco Magazine named him as one of "100 artists putting the East Bay on the map."

In February 2019, the Obama Foundation hosted an event in Oakland for its My Brother's Keeper initiative, which former president Barack Obama attended. Mays was commissioned by the Obama Foundation to create an installation for the venue, and he produced murals of smiling black boys. He also spoke to youth at the event about life as an artist.

In November 2020 it was announced that Kaiser Permanente and ABG Art Group were partnering to commission a mural about social justice for Liberation Park in Oakland by Mays and Rachel Wolfe-Goldsmith.
