= Richard Lee (activist) =

American marijuana rights activist (1962–2025)

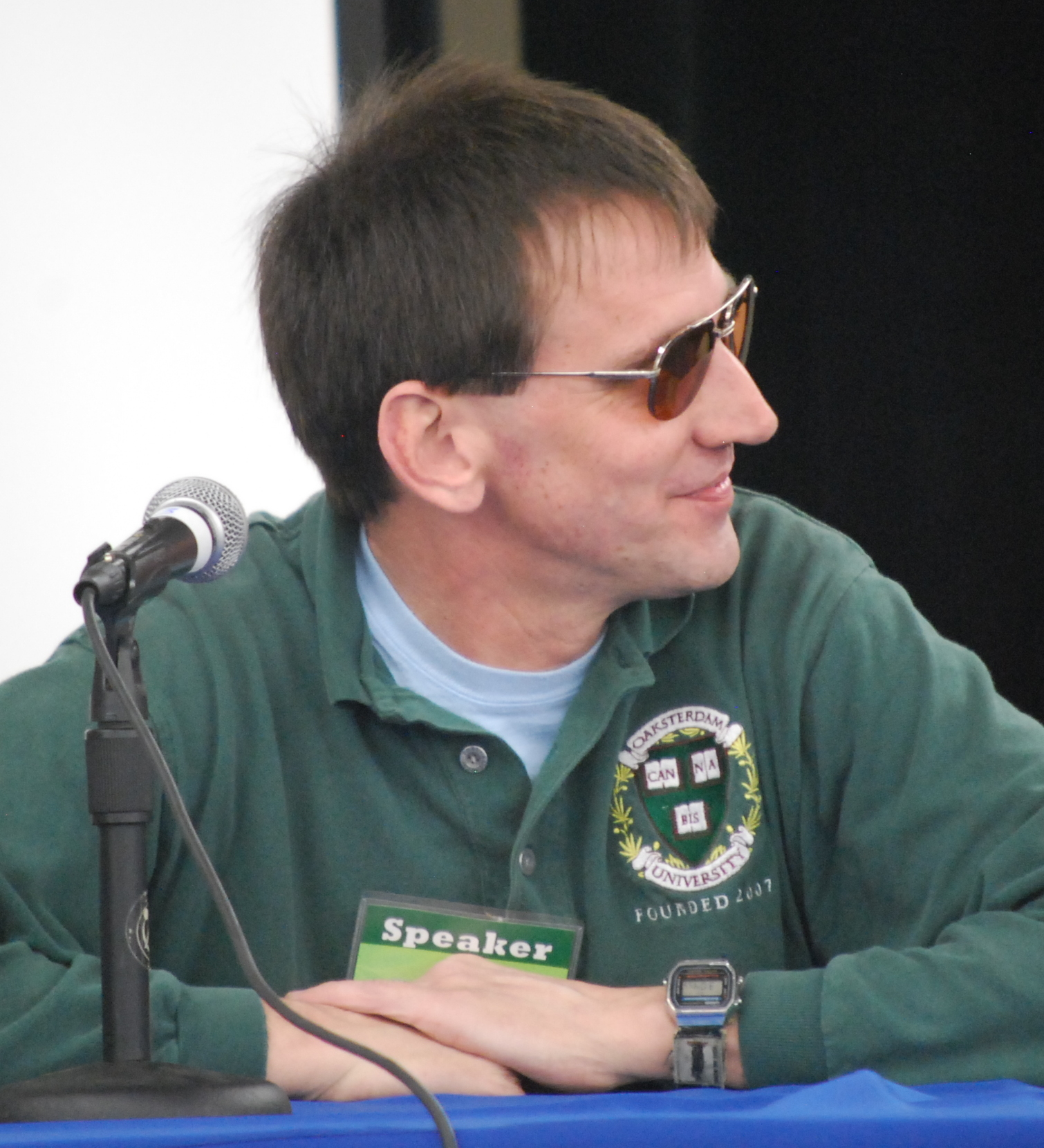
- Lee in 2010
- Born: October 7, 1962; Houston, Texas, U.S.
- Died: July 27, 2025 (aged 62); Houston, Texas, U.S.
- Occupation: Cannabis activist
- Organization: Oaksterdam University

Richard Seib Lee (October 7, 1962 – July 27, 2025) was an American marijuana rights activist who ran various medical marijuana programs throughout downtown Oakland, California. Lee was regarded as a central figure in Northern California's medical marijuana movement. He also operated a coffee shop. He was active in working to end cannabis prohibition from 1992.

== California Proposition 19 ==
Lee was the chief promoter of California Proposition 19, titled the "Regulate, Control and Tax Cannabis Act of 2010", which was a measure to legalize marijuana in California. On December 14, 2009 the secretary of state confirmed receipt of enough signatures to qualify the measure for inclusion on the November 2010 ballot. The initiative failed to pass, with 54% of California voters voting "No", and 46% voting "Yes".

== Oaksterdam University ==
In 2007, Lee founded Oaksterdam University, the United States' first cannabis college. The educational facility offers classes on science, politics, and legal issues related to the cannabis plant including horticulture, business management, extractions, budtending, regulatory licensing and entrepreneurship. Lee led the organization until 2012, when it was raided by federal authorities and reopened under new leadership.

== Personal life and death ==
Lee was born in Houston, Texas in 1962, the son of Robert and Anne (née Edwards) Lee. He had four brothers. Lee was paralyzed in a work accident in 1990 at the age of 28 when he fell from a scaffold while setting up for a concert, fracturing multiple vertebrae and leaving him in a wheelchair. He used marijuana to manage pain from back spasms and nerve pain stemming from his accident.

Lee died in Houston on July 27, 2025, at the age of 62, from cancer complications.

== See also ==
- Oaksterdam University
- California Proposition 19
- Cannabis in California
- The Bulldog
- Berkeley Patients Group
