= Chris Conrad (author) =

American author, activist, publisher, and court-recognized cannabis expert

- Conrad speaking at the 2014 Seattle Hempfest
- Born: March 10, 1953 (age 73); Lafayette, Indiana, United States
- Education: California State University, Dominguez Hills
- Occupations: Author, publisher, museum curator, drug policy activist, expert witness
- Website: chrisconrad.com

Chris Conrad (born March 10, 1953) is an American author, activist, curator, publisher and court-recognized expert in cannabis cultivation and use. He has played a key role in the shaping of the modern industrial and medical cannabis reform movements as the author of such seminal books as Hemp: Lifeline to the Future (1993) and Hemp for Health (1997), as well as through his activist work as the co-founder and first President of the Hemp Industries Association (HIA), founder of the Business Alliance in Commerce and Hemp (BACH), and a signature gathering coordinator for the Proposition 215 volunteer effort which made California the first US state to legalize the medical use of cannabis. The December 1999 issue of High Times ranked Conrad #10 on its list of the top 25 "living legends in the battle for legal cannabis."

== Books ==
Conrad's writing career began when he designed and edited a revised edition of the hemp prohibition classic The Emperor Wears No Clothes by Jack Herer in 1990. He followed this with the publication of Hemp: Lifeline to the Future (1993), which was subsequently translated into Italian, and Hemp for Health (1997), which was subsequently translated into Spanish, Portuguese, Czech and German. He is also the author of Cannabis Yields and Dosages (2004) and Nostradamus and the Attack on New York.

Conrad has co-authored two books with collaborators Virginia Resner and his wife Mikki Norris: Shattered Lives: Portraits From America's Drug War and Human Rights and the US Drug War.

In 2007, Conrad contributed a chapter on cannabis history to Pourquoi & Comment Cultiver Du Chanvre by Michka, where his writing appeared alongside contributions from other notable authors such as Jorge Cervantes, Raphael Mechoulam and Stephen Jay Gould.

== Activist career ==
In 1989, Conrad and his wife Mikki Norris co-founded the American Hemp Council, with the purpose of educating the American public on the many uses of industrial hemp and the laws against the crop in the United States.

In 1996, in the final weeks of the campaign (after the money came in and he was hired to do so), Conrad became the signature-gathering coordinator for the volunteer effort to pass California's Proposition 215, the initiative which would go on to make the state the first in the U.S. to legalize the medical use of marijuana. He was also a vocal supporter of California's Proposition 19 in 2010, which came within four points of making California the first state to legalize all adult uses of cannabis.

Conrad has also been active in the movement to legalize industrial hemp, serving as the first president of the Hemp Industries Association (HIA) and founding the Business Alliance of Commerce in Hemp (BACH).

== Oaksterdam faculty ==
Since 2007, Conrad has taught at Oaksterdam University's Oakland, California campus, where he teaches the history and politics of cannabis.

== Exhibits curated ==
In 1993 and 2000, Conrad curated and designed the Hash-Marijuana-Hemp Museum in Amsterdam, the Netherlands. In 1995, Conrad and his wife Mikki Norris partnered with Virginia Resner to create and curate the "Human Rights '95: Atrocities of the Drug War" photo exhibit to put a human face on non-violent prisoners of the Drug War and to show how the Drug War operates through their stories. Launched at the Fort Mason Center in San Francisco on June 24, 1995, to commemorate the 50th anniversary of the United Nations, the exhibit was put in the context of the UN's Declaration on Human Rights. The grand opening presented a program called "Give Drug Peace a Chance" which included Ram Dass, Paul Krassner, Jello Biafra, Ngaio Bealum, New Riders of the Purple Sage, and Terence Hallinan. They toured with this exhibit for many years, creating smaller excerpted displays that were shown at libraries, universities, conferences, and other events under the name "Human Rights and the Drug War". From 2011 to the present, Conrad has curated the Oaksterdam Cannabis Museum in Oakland, California.

== Awards ==
In 2001, Conrad and Norris received the Drug Policy Alliance's Robert C. Randall Award for Achievement in the Field of Citizen Action, along with collaborator Virginia Resner, Randy Credico of the William Moses Kunstler Fund for Racial Justice and Nora Callahan of the November Coalition.

In 2004, Conrad and Norris received the Outstanding Citizen Activism Award at the 2004 national NORML conference.

In 2010, Conrad was the recipient of Oaksterdam University's Lifetime Achievement Award.

In 2014, Conrad and his wife Mikki Norris were jointly awarded the Seattle Hempfest Outstanding Cannabis Activist Award in recognition of their writing and advocacy work.
