= Mikki Norris =

American drug policy activist and author

- Born: July 18, 1952 (age 74)
- Occupations: Drug policy activist, publisher, author
- Website: hr95.org

Mikki Norris (born July 18, 1952) is an American drug policy activist, former publisher, and author, known for her work highlighting the human cost of the US war on drugs. She co-authored, with husband Chris Conrad and Virginia Resner, Shattered Lives: Portraits From America's Drug War and Human Rights and the US Drug War. Norris was also the co-founder, managing editor, and publisher of the West Coast Leaf, the "cannabis newspaper of record" for the West Coast of the United States from 2008 to 2013. The newspaper has gone digital, and is now The Leaf Online.

== Education ==
Norris earned a bachelor's degree from the University of California, Los Angeles, where she studied sociology. She then pursued graduate studies at California State University, Los Angeles, where she earned a master's degree in education.

== Activism ==
Norris began her Drug War activism in 1989, when she and her husband, Chris Conrad, founded the American Hemp Council. They became outspoken activists and organizers for the many uses of the hemp plant.

In 1993, Norris assisted her husband in curating and designing the Amsterdam Hash, Marihuana & Hemp Museum.

In 1995, Norris and her husband Chris Conrad partnered with Virginia Resner to create the "Human Rights '95: Atrocities of the Drug War" photo exhibit which put a human face on non-violent prisoners of the Drug War and showed how the Drug War operates through their personal stories. Launched at the Fort Mason Center in San Francisco on June 24, 1995, to commemorate the 50th Anniversary of the United Nations, the exhibit looked at the issue in the context UN's Declaration on Human Rights. The grand opening presented a program called, "Give Drug Peace a Chance," and included Ram Dass, Paul Krassner, Jello Biafra, Ngaio Bealum, New Riders of the Purple Sage, Terence Hallinan, and Dennis Peron. In November, 1995, Norris and Conrad created a photo exhibit for the Drugs Peace House in Amsterdam, Netherlands, that traveled to other European Cities. Norris created 30 smaller excerpted displays that were shown at libraries, universities, conferences, and events across the US under the name "Human Rights and the Drug War." In order to reach a wider audience with this information, she developed the web site, Human Rights and the Drug War.

In 1996, for the final six weeks of the signature-gathering period, Norris and Conrad were hired on as Community Action Coordinators, managing the volunteer signature gathering campaign effort for the Compassionate Use Act, later known as Proposition 215.

In 2002, Norris founded the Cannabis Consumers Campaign, which operates a website where cannabis consumers can "come out" about their experiences using the plant and take a stand for equal rights.

In 2006, Norris was a hired consultant on the California Cities Campaign which ran ballot initiatives in three cities to make enforcement of marijuana possession crimes the lowest law enforcement priority. The campaigns were successful in Santa Barbara (66% approval), Santa Monica (65%) and Santa Cruz (64%). In addition, she consulted with city officials in West Hollywood and San Francisco, which passed similar ordinances that same year.

In 2008, Norris was a delegate to the Beyond 2008 NGO Forum in Vancouver, British Columbia, where multiple NGOs met to advise the United Nations on drug policy. The following year, Norris and husband Chris Conrad attended high-level meetings at the United Nations Commission on Narcotic Drugs in Vienna, when that body adopted "respect for human rights" as one of its policy recommendations.

== Awards ==
In 2014, Norris and husband Chris Conrad were awarded the National Cannabis Activist Award at Seattle Hempfest.

In 2010, Norris and Conrad shared the Lifetime Achievement Award from Oaksterdam University.

In 2006, Norris was awarded the Pauline Sabin Award at the national NORML conference.

In 2004, Norris shared the Outstanding Citizen Activism Award with Conrad at the national NORML conference.

In 2001, Norris and Conrad shared the Robert C. Randall Award for Achievement in Citizen Action from the Lindesmith/Drug Policy Foundation.

In 1999, Norris and Conrad received recognition as "Local Heroes" in the Best of the Bay issue of the San Francisco Bay Guardian.
