= Hemp Industries Association =

Non-profit trade group

- Formation: 1994; 32 years ago
- Founder: Chris Conrad
- Founded at: Arizona
- Type: Trade association
- Website: www.thehia.org

The Hemp Industries Association (HIA) is a non-profit trade group representing hemp companies, researchers and supporters in the United States and Canada. The group petitions for fair and equal treatment of industrial hemp. Since 1994, the HIA has been dedicated to education, industry development, and the accelerated expansion of hemp world market supply and demand.

== History ==
HIA was established in 1994 by 45 U.S. hemp industry companies. Cannabis activist and author Chris Conrad served as its first president. By 1998 the association had more than 200 members.

In 2010, the organization bought the diaries of Lyster Dewey and plans to display them to the public for the first time in many years at the first Hemp History Week.

HIA Executive Director Eric Steenstra said in 2014 that hemp seed oil is less than 25 parts per million CBD, thus hemp seed oil is not a source of CBD which could be used in epilepsy treatments.

== HIA vs. DEA ==
On October 9, 2001, the Drug Enforcement Administration (DEA) posted an interpretive rule on its website declaring that all hempseed products containing any traces of THC would be considered seizable contraband, effectively criminalizing all hempseed products in the US. After a period of public comment, the DEA filed the final proposed rule in the Federal Register on March 21, 2003. One week later, the HIA joined with the Organic Consumers Association and several companies which used hempseed in one or more products to file suit against the DEA rule going into effect.

On February 6, 2004, the Ninth Circuit Court of Appeals ruled unanimously for the HIA, opining that the DEA did not have the authority under the federal Controlled Substances Act to ban an otherwise legal product because it might have traces of THC. On September 28, 2004, the Supreme Court of the United States declined to hear the appeal, allowing the Ninth Circuit decision to stand. The settlement between HIA and DEA was finally reached on May 25, 2018, in the Ninth Circuit Court of Appeals.
