= Oaksterdam University =

Trade school in Oakland, California

- Type: Not-for-Profit
- Industry: Cannabis Education
- Founded: November 2007; 19 years ago in Oakland, California, U.S.
- Headquarters: Oakland, California
- Key people: Dale Sky Jones, Jeff Jones, Richard Lee
- Number of employees: 23
- Website: Official website

Oaksterdam University is an unaccredited trade school located in Oakland, California. It was founded in 2007 by marijuana rights activist Richard Lee. The school offers asynchronous, online, and in-person courses covering cannabis horticulture, the business of cannabis, cannabis extraction and manufacturing, and bud-tending.

== History ==
Jeff Jones co-founded the Oakland Cannabis Buyers' Cooperative (OCBC) in 1995. The OCBC initially functioned as a bicycle delivery service, providing cannabis to patients with medical needs in Oakland, California. Richard Lee, a cultivator from Houston, Texas, regularly provided the OCBC with high-quality cannabis, contributing to the reduction of prices. In July 1996, the City of Oakland formally endorsed the OCBC through a resolution.

Subsequently, Jones established the first medical cannabis dispensary sanctioned by the city government at 1755 Broadway. In the same year, California voters approved Proposition 215, which legalized the possession and cultivation of medical cannabis under state law.

In 1997, Lee relocated to Oakland and co-founded the Hemp Research Company. The Oakland City Council established a committee to clarify the medical use of cannabis and to define the city's role in enforcing drug laws. Attorney Robert Reich provided educational opportunities to the Oakland Police Department, advocating for cannabis to be considered their lowest law enforcement priority. In 2000, a District Court case involving Jeff Jones progressed to the U.S. Supreme Court. In United States v. Oakland Cannabis Buyers Cooperative, OCBC argued for the right to manufacture and distribute marijuana for medical patients, but the U.S. Supreme Court did not rule in their favor.

In 2003, Lee opened coffee shop SR-17, which would later become coffee shop Blue Sky, joining other medical cannabis dispensaries that had cropped up in the now cannabis-friendly Oakland.

Lee later said he was inspired to create Oaksterdam University after visiting the Cannabis College in Amsterdam. Lee recalled:

In November of 2006 I visited Amsterdam and saw the Cannabis College there. I've seen in California that there are not enough good people who want to work in the cannabis industry in a professional way, who want to pay taxes and obey regulations and help improve their community. I came back from Amsterdam and the idea just popped into the back of my head...

Lee placed an ad in the East Bay Express that read, "Cannabis Industry, Now Hiring." In the first week, he received more than 200 calls, and Oaksterdam University was born. The university offered its first classes to 22 students in November 2007. They were taught horticulture, cooking, extracts, legal issues and managing successful law enforcement encounters, plus politics and history, from leaders in the cannabis movement, including Jeff Jones, Chris Conrad, attorney Lawrence Lichter, Dennis Peron, and Lee himself. Oaksterdam University quickly became "ground zero" for the international cannabis reform movement.

Demand for classes grew quickly, with multi-month-long waitlists. Dale Sky Jones joined Oaksterdam's staff as a science instructor in February 2008 and was determined to add satellite schools nationwide, starting with the first in Los Angeles, a second in Ann Arbor, Michigan, and a third in Sebastopol, California.

By November 2009, two years after the school's inception, the Oakland campus at 1600 Broadway was renovated to meet increased demand. The new 30,000-square-foot school included multiple classrooms, an auditorium, a hands-on grow lab, a theater, and a 10,000-square-foot basement nursery full of cannabis plants.

In 2009, the City of Oakland Marijuana Tax Measure F passed, making Oakland, California, the first city in the country to assess a tax on medical cannabis clubs and dispensaries. Oaksterdam welcomed thousands of students from around the world, contributing to the revitalization of the neighborhood.

In addition to educating students, Oaksterdam University leaders acted as activists in the legalization movement, beginning with supporting California Proposition 19 in 2010. Lee spent $1.3 million, including profits from OU, to get the initiative on the ballot. While Prop 19 failed, the campaign became a blueprint for the cannabis legalization movement in California and subsequent states.

OU faculty helped write California's 1996 Proposition 215 Medical Marijuana Initiative; 1996 California Senate Bill 420 (also known as the Compassionate Care Act), 2016 California Proposition 64; and multiple state-level ballot initiatives. Faculty continue to advise on the legislation and regulation of cannabis by local, state, and international governments and agencies.

=== Raid ===
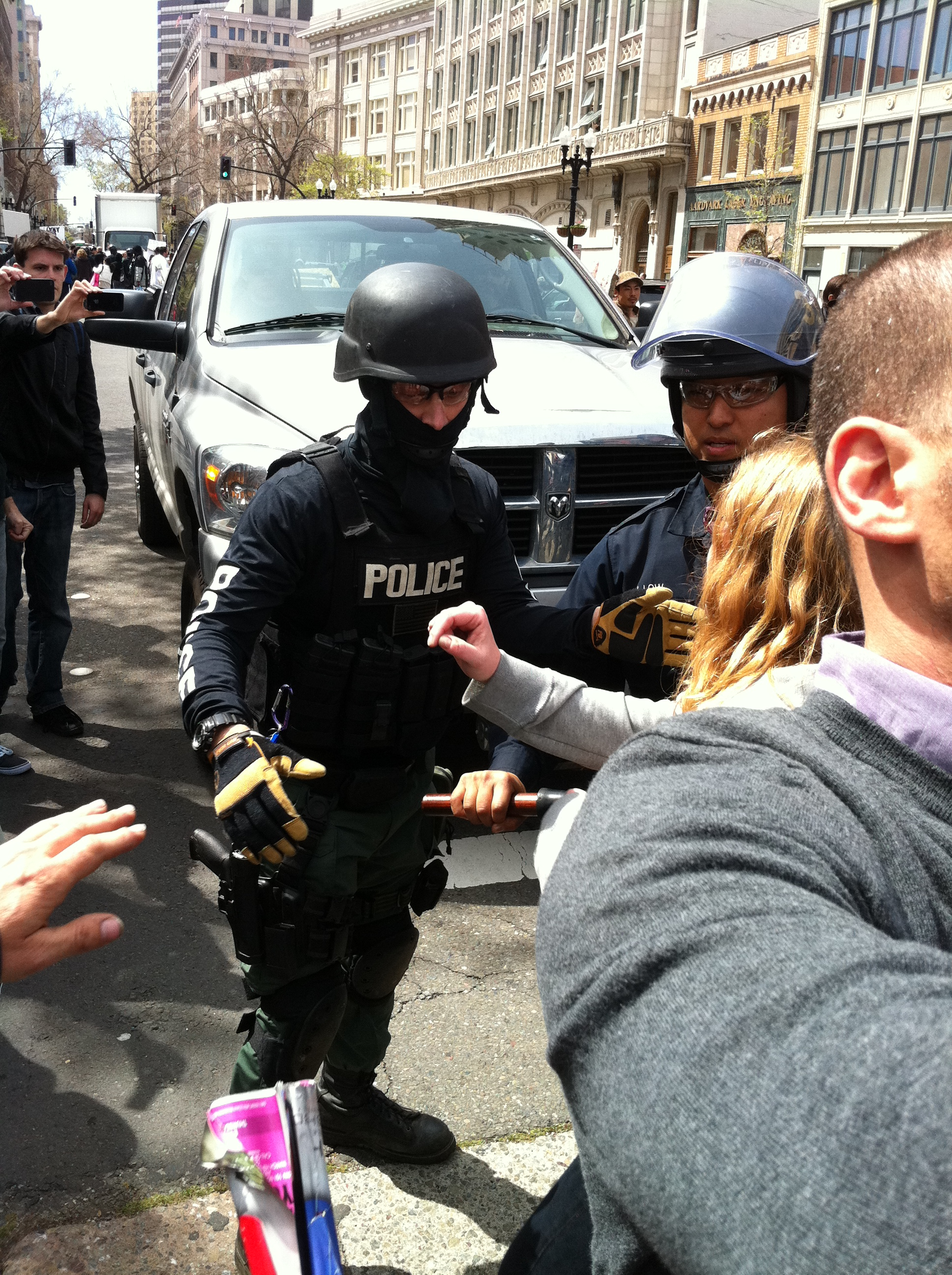
A masked DEA agent during the April 2, 2012 raid

On April 2, 2012, Oaksterdam University was raided by the IRS, accompanied by the DEA and US Marshals Service. The raid additionally targeted coffee shop Blue Sky and the Oaksterdam Museum, both affiliated with Oaksterdam University. A number of the university's assets were seized, including plants, records, computers, and bank accounts.

A city council member told press that Oakland officials had not been briefed in advance about the raid, nor about what crime had allegedly been committed. After the raid, Oaksterdam University officials stated that they would immediately reopen. Oaksterdam University continued classes less than 48 hours later. Founder Richard Lee said he would be giving up ownership of the organization, citing mounting debt and concern for incurring federal charges. Ultimately no charges were filed. After the raid, Richard Lee retired, announcing he would focus on legislative activism.

Consequently, Oaksterdam executive chancellor Dale Sky Jones took over the position of Head of School in April 2012. The school lost many staff members and moved to a smaller venue in downtown Oakland, though some school officials continued to teach classes.

== Curriculum ==
The university's curriculum covers all aspects of the medical marijuana industry, including horticulture, business management, bud-tending, law, politics, history, civics, economics, manufacturing, extraction, advocacy, CBD, hemp, pain management, and more.

The school primarily delivers their curriculum online through synchronous meetings and "self-paced" asynchronous programs.

Certificates are awarded upon completing classes, however the university has failed to receive accreditation due to the federal legality of marijuana. Oaksterdam's certificates are recognized across the industry, and students can transfer up to 18 Oaksterdam credits toward a bachelor's degree in the business of cannabis as part of a partnership with Golden Gate University.

== Notable faculty ==
- Ed Rosenthal – author of books on cannabis horticulture
- Richard Lee – founder of Oaksterdam University, proponent of California's Proposition 19 (2010)
- Chris Conrad – author of Cannabis history and industrial hemp
- Paul Armentano — executive director of NORML
- Robert Raich — attorney who served as legal counsel in both cannabis cases heard by the Supreme Court
- Bruce Margolin — cannabis defense attorney
- Kyle Kushman — American author

== Opposition ==
In 2008, the Drug Enforcement Administration (DEA) opposed Oaksterdam University, arguing that the institution "sends the wrong message in the country's fight against drugs and promotes criminal activity." Despite this, public sentiment has evolved, with increasing numbers of medical professionals, including U.S. Surgeon General Vivek Murthy, acknowledging the potential therapeutic benefits of marijuana. Retired DEA Administrative Law Judge Francis L. Young, in a 1988 ruling, asserted, "The evidence in this record clearly shows that marijuana has been accepted as capable of relieving the distress of great numbers of very ill people and doing so with safety under medical supervision. It would be unreasonable, arbitrary and capricious for DEA to continue to stand between those sufferers and the benefits of this substance in light of the evidence in this record."

The legal landscape for the university experienced a notable shift following the release of the Cole Memorandum on August 29, 2013. This federal guidance deprioritized the prosecution of cannabis businesses in states that had legalized the drug for medical or adult use. Since 2012, multiple states including California have legalized marijuana.

Oaksterdam University offers assistance to agencies aiming to establish a regulated, taxable, and safe cannabis industry within their jurisdictions. The university also offers technical assistance known as Cannabis Social Equity programs in the California cities of Oakland, Los Angeles, Palm Springs, San Francisco, and Monterey. Oaksterdam also worked with the state of Connecticut's Social Equity Council to build a social equity cannabis business accelerator program with the Hartford-based nonprofit reSET.

== In media ==
Oaksterdam University has been featured in worldwide press articles as an organization on the forefront of the cannabis legalization movement and expert source on cannabis business, horticulture, science and medicine.

Oaksterdam is featured in the TV movie Going to Pot: The Highs and Lows of It.

Oaksterdam University is the subject of the 2012 documentary California, 90420.

Dale Sky Jones and Oaksterdam are featured in the 2017 documentary The Legend of 420.

Oaksterdam University is the subject of the 2014 documentaries Legalize It and Let Timmy Smoke.

Oaksterdam was featured in a 2014 episode of 10 Things You Don't Know About.

Oaksterdam University was part of the 2013 video short Clippin' the Buds: Medical Marijuana and the Marijuana Pill.

The 2010 TV movie documentary, Marijuana: A Chronic History, featured OU. Oaksterdam is the primary focus of the 2023 documentary American Pot Story.
