= Kwik Way =

American restaurant chain

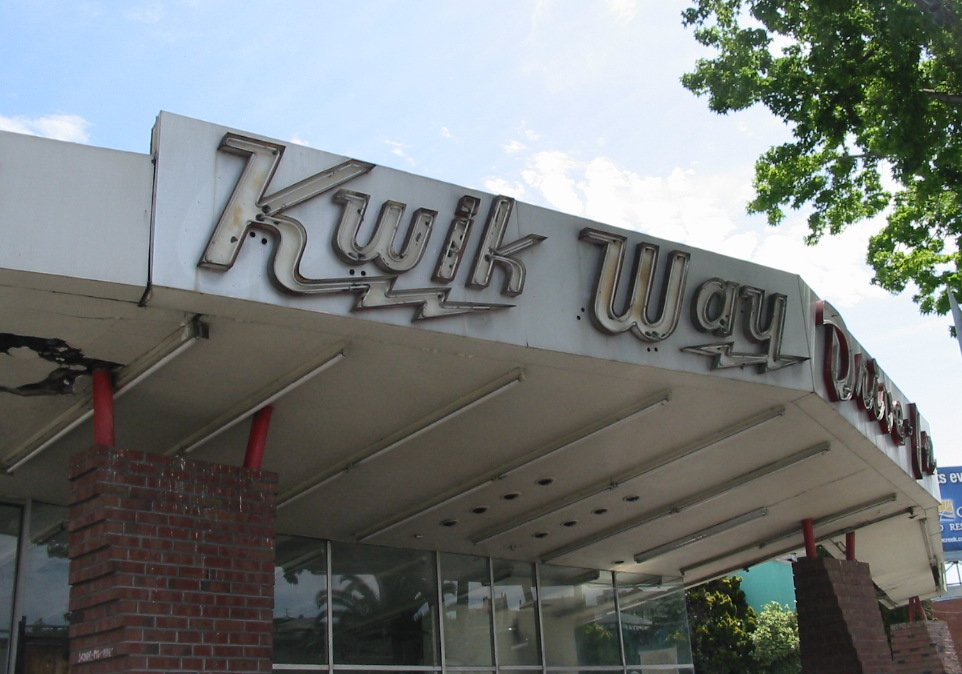
Kwik Way neon sign in Oakland in 2009 before renovation

The original Kwik Way fast food restaurant chain, based in Oakland, California, began at 63rd & E 14th in 1952. Owned by partners Lehman & Mahoney, they followed with a Kwik Way at 22nd & Telegraph, in 1954, followed with a 3rd restaurant, the Grand Lake Drive In, at 500 Lake Park in 1956. All three restaurants were identical in operation in their heyday, and run under common ownership. When partners Lehman & Mahoney retired from active management, each restaurant sold to the then current managers, thereby forever ending the famous Oakland chain. Only one location remains: The Grand Lake Drive In became Kwik Way, a revival of name only. That restaurant near the Grand Lake Theater was later owned by Alex and Charles Hahn, and has been cleaned up and relaunched by Gary Rizzo. That venture closed three years later. In September 2019, the Ecumenical Association for Housing announced plans to develop 50 units of affordable housing on the site, which it purchased the year before.

Not to be confused with the long gone original Kwik Way, the later restaurants became notorious. "Complaints have included greasy food, bad service, unsanitary conditions, and complaints from neighbors about the late-night crowd it attracted. But the kicker came in 1981 when an unsuspecting customer discovered a fried dead mouse in her order." Her claims, however, were never substantiated. Kwik Way gave its name to one of Oakland's only Hardcore bands Kwik Way and was featured in the Commander Cody and His Lost Planet Airmen award-winning music video for their tune "Two Triple Cheese, Side Order of Fries".

Famous Oaklander Frank Oz used to "live on it", but fitting with Kwik Way's reputation, he also said, "I can't believe I didn't die from it. I don't know how I survived because that's where we went."

The last remaining Kwik Way was in negotiations for being turned into a Fatburger and a McDonald's in 2005 which was met with protest. The negotiations fizzled.
