= Your Black Muslim Bakery =

Muslim bakery chain linked to various crimes

- Type: Private (defunct)
- Industry: Bakery
- Founded: 1968 in Santa Barbara, California, U.S.
- Defunct: August 9, 2007
- Headquarters: 5832 San Pablo Avenue, since 1971 in Oakland, California, U.S.
- Number of locations: 5
- Area served: San Francisco Bay Area
- Key people: Yusuf Bey; (Founder); Yusuf Bey IV; (CEO)
- Products: traditional American baked goods
- Services: distribution to retail stores
- Parent: Your Black Muslim Bakery, Inc.

Your Black Muslim Bakery (YBMB) was an American chain of bakeries opened by Yusuf Bey in 1968 in Santa Barbara, California, and relocated to Oakland in 1971. A power broker at the center of a local community, YBMB was held out as a model of African American economic self-sufficiency. However, Bey was later revealed to have been involved in widespread rape, incest, welfare fraud, and murder.

After Bey's death in 2003, YBMB fell into debt and declared Chapter 11 bankruptcy in October 2006. In August 2007, in connection with investigations into the murder of Oakland Post journalist Chauncey Bailey and a number of other crimes, police conducted a massive raid on the company's San Pablo Avenue bakery. A concurrent health inspection resulted in its closure. Later that day, a court ordered the pending reorganization converted into a liquidation bankruptcy.

== Origins ==
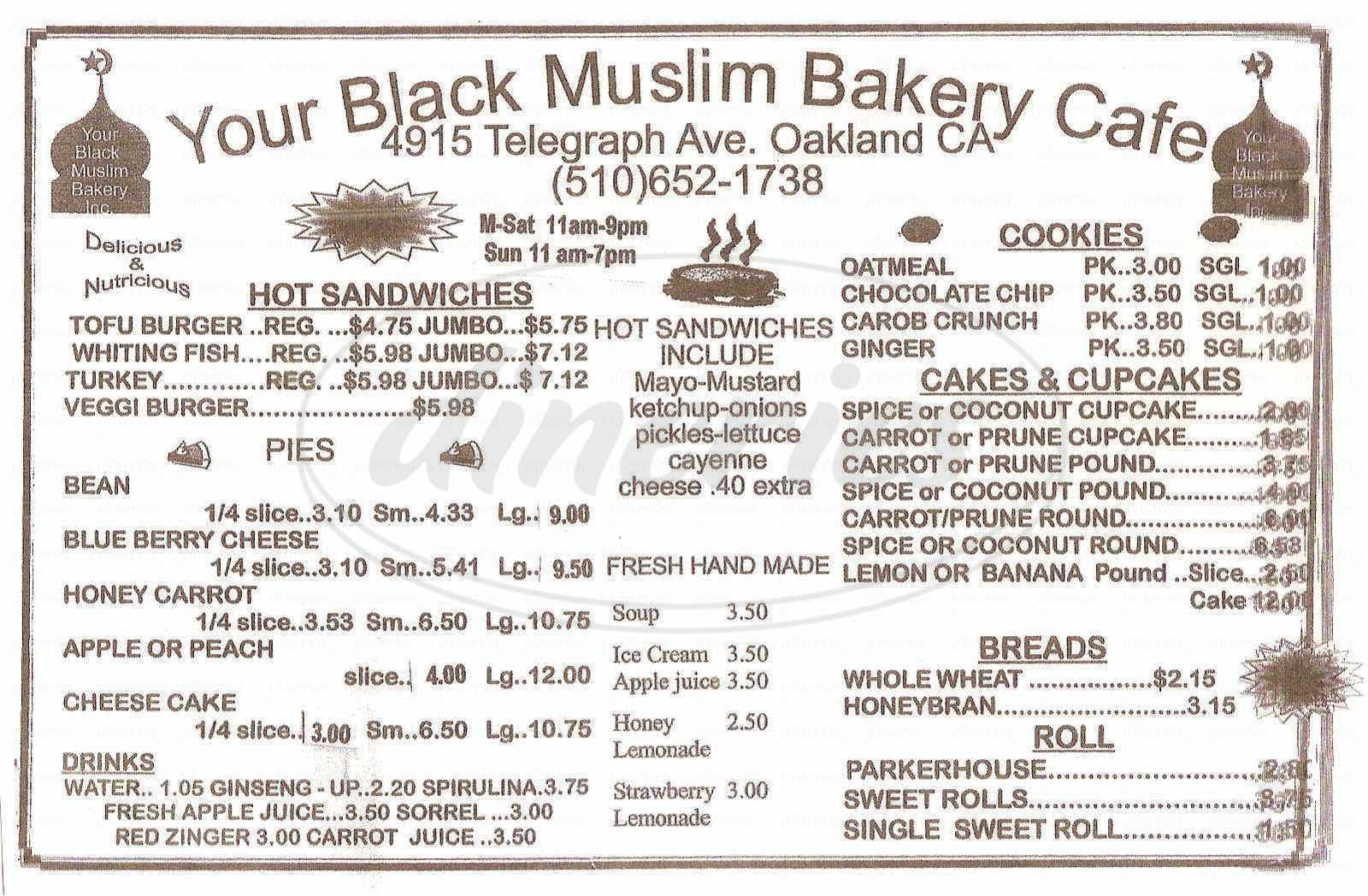
Bakery menu

Yusuf Bey, born Joseph Stephens, came to Oakland, California, with his family from Texas in the early 1950s. He later opened beauty salons in the San Francisco Bay Area and in southern California, before going into the bakery business. After discovering the teachings of Elijah Muhammad in the 1960s, Bey converted to the Nation of Islam (NOI) in 1964 and founded the "Islamic" bakery in Santa Barbara in 1968. The bakery was not officially affiliated with the NOI and not representative of mainstream Muslim cultures. NOI minister Keith Muhammad, of East Oakland's Muhammad Mosque #26, stated that the two organizations were distinct and separate.

Bey named the business Your Black Muslim Bakery (YBMB) on the personal recommendation of Elijah Muhammad, who had become his spiritual guide. In 1971, Bey moved the bakery to Oakland. By 1974 it was the "largest Bay Area bakery specializing exclusively in natural food products", with over 6,000 loaves of bread and over 300 cakes per week sold at 150 stores.

During the mid-1980s, Bey appeared regularly on a local Oakland cable television lecture program, True Solutions, during which he broadcast his hour-long sermons every week. On the program Bey also promoted the bakery, and frequently expounded on the need for the economic self-reliance and "knowledge of self" of African Americans, whom he lectured the audience as being the "Original Man", a racially charged idea derived from the NOI's doctrine of Yakub. By the 1990s, YBMB and its leaders were a respected part of Oakland society, and had substantial influence in local politics. They used their power to obtain favors from the city, influence local elections, and avoid scrutiny from police. Bey ran unsuccessfully for mayor in 1994, garnering 5% of the vote.

By 2007, the company was headquartered at 5832 San Pablo Avenue, with five branch locations listed in Alameda County records, including a store on Telegraph Avenue in Oakland's Temescal district and another at Oakland International Airport. The bakery also had a location at the Oakland Coliseum.

== Yusuf Bey era controversies ==
=== Akbar Bey ===
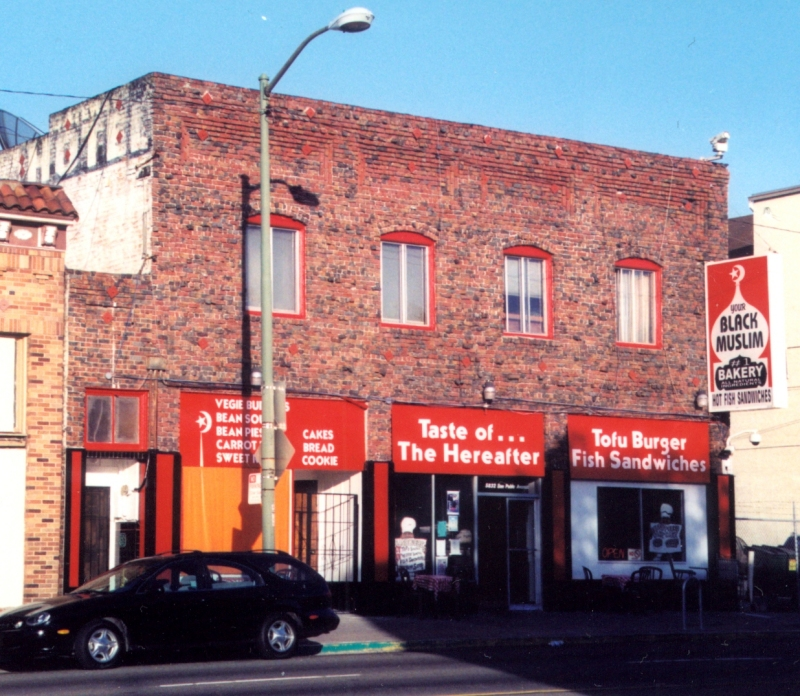
Your Black Muslim Bakery #1, May 2002.

In 1994, Bey's son Akbar was shot four times and killed by a local drug dealer outside the Omni nightclub near the corner of Shattuck Avenue and 50th Street in Oakland. Court records showed the pathologist's conclusion that Akbar was high on heroin or morphine at the time of his death. Three months before his killing, Akbar had been charged with felony counts of carrying a concealed weapon and evading the police, resulting in a car chase and crash at 44th Street and Market Street.

=== 1994 Nedir and Abaz Bey trial ===
On March 4, 1994, Nedir Bey was involved in the torture and beating of a Nigerian home-seller in an apartment on the 500 block of 24th Street in Oakland, involving a real estate deal. The apartment complex served as a compound for the Bey organization. The incident also involved Abaz Bey. Both Abaz and Nedir were standing members of the African-American Advisory Committee on Crime, which also included Oakland's then-mayor Elihu Harris. The committee had organized a massive conference on crime that same weekend, featuring Jesse Jackson as its keynote speaker.

The assault escalated into a massive incident in which 90 Oakland Police officers were engaged in hand-to-hand combat with 30 Black Muslims, some of whom were armed. The two Beys and two other men were charged with felony counts of assault, robbery, and false imprisonment. A year later, all four men pleaded no contest to one felony count of false imprisonment. The prosecutors had cut a plea deal, in part because they were unable to take testimony from any tenant witnesses at the apartment complex where the Bey organization stationed its members as security, like a private compound. Nedir Bey served six months of home detention, and Abaz Bey got eight months' home detention.

=== 1996 City loan ===
In 1996, the City of Oakland loaned YBMB $1.1 million to start a home health care business. The loan was never repaid, and the home health care business never was established.

=== Yusuf Bey rape trial ===
Bey's detractors—notably East Bay Express journalist Chris Thompson—accused him of cultism, corruption, and antisemitism. Many accusations of physical and sexual abuse, including rape and incest, and which were sustained by DNA evidence, were made against Bey, culminating in felony charges which were pending at the time of his death.

On September 19, 2002, Bey turned himself in to Oakland Police when a warrant was issued for his arrest, charged with 27 counts in the alleged rapes of four girls under the age of 14. The cases were pending trial into the following year. The oldest allegation was that, beginning twenty years earlier, he serially raped through coercion a preteen girl who, as a ten-year-old, came under foster care of Bey and his wife Nora. Bey died of cancer in October 2003 at age 67 while the first case was awaiting trial.

Through interviews, birth certificates, sworn depositions and other records in Alameda and surrounding counties it was determined that Bey had at least 42 children with 14 women and girls, with one of his victims becoming pregnant at as young as 12.

== Second-generation controversies ==
=== Waajid Bey ===
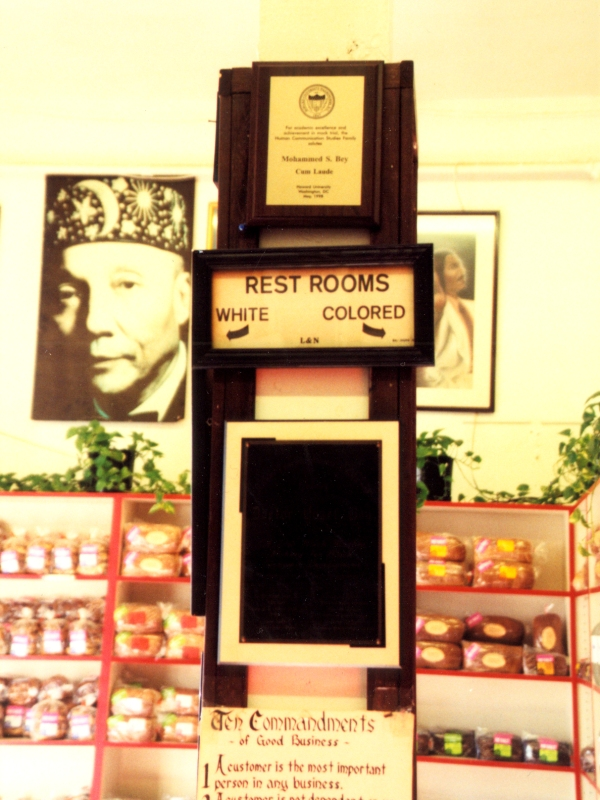
Interior of the bakery, May 2002. The plaque on top grants cum laude status to Mohammed S. Bey from Howard University.

Following the death of Yusuf Bey in 2003, Waajid Aliawaad Bey became chief executive officer of YBMB. In March 2004, at age 51, Waajid disappeared for several months, until the discovery of his badly decomposed body in a shallow grave off Skyline Blvd. in the Oakland Hills. He was determined to be the victim of a homicide.

=== Antar Bey ===
YBMB was then taken over by Yusuf Bey's son, Antar Bey. At age 23 on October 25, 2005, Antar was shot to death in what police believe to have been a failed carjacking while he was stopped to get gas on Martin Luther King Jr. Way, near 55th Street. On December 14, 2007, Alfonza Phillips III was sentenced to life imprisonment for his murder. Another son, Yusuf Bey IV, took over YBMB in October 2005.

=== Yusuf Bey IV ===
Yusuf Bey IV became the CEO of YBMB at the age of 19 in 2005. As was later stated in court documents, "The Bakery did not thrive under the leadership of Antar or [Yusuf Bey IV]." Numerous poor financial decisions made by both Antar and Bey IV eventually led the bakery to file for chapter 11 bankruptcy in 2006. In 2007, Bey rejected a financing offer made by the family of his sister's husband because this financing proposal was contingent on Bey IV's agreement to reorganize the bakery's board and bring in qualified outside individuals to run the business, and Bey refused to agree to these requirements.

In November 2005, two Muslim-owned liquor stores in Oakland were vandalized, one of which was captured on a store surveillance tape. Another store was burned, and a store owner was briefly abducted by men wearing the distinctive bow-tie apparel associated with the NOI. The men had demanded that the stores stop selling alcohol to African Americans based on Islamic prohibitions against alcohol. Yusuf Bey IV was among those arrested in the case and he was charged with having led the attacks. He was also later convicted of stealing a shotgun from an employee of one of these stores. This shotgun was later used in the murder of Chauncey Bailey.

In February 2006, in nearby Vallejo, Yusuf IV was arrested and later found guilty of a number of crimes related to his scheme to buy a $55,000 luxury Mercedes-Benz from a used-car lot by using false credit information and identification. He was also charged with trying to open a bank account with the false information. Vallejo police dropped charges concerning a 9mm pistol and ammunition which had been found in the car in a criminal investigation surrounding the disappearance an alleged drug dealer who attempted to sell drugs to high school students.

Yusuf IV was arrested in San Francisco on assault charges in April 2006, after allegedly trying to run down three security guards outside a strip club in his BMW after he had been thrown out. Then he was charged with missing several court dates, for which he became wanted on a $375,000 warrant. According to later court documents, he also used a stolen identification with a fake driver's license to fraudulently obtain favorable credit to buy a house in the 2500 block of 61st Avenue. Yusuf IV signed all the documents with the name Yasir Human. The US$550,000 loan was through CIT Group/Consumer Finance Inc.

=== Sayyed Yusuf Bey ===
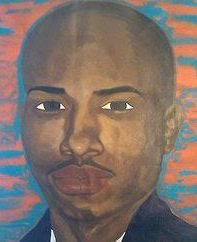
Portrait of Sayyed Yusuf Bey

Sayyed Yusuf "Weedy" Bey was one of the elder Yusuf Bey's older sons. After graduating from the Elijah Education Center in 1994, he joined the True Solutions production team as a camera operator and worked as a baker at YBMB. Sayyed also had a minor role in the 1998 feature film Drylongso. That year, he also moved to Los Angeles to pursue his passion of exotic automobiles and became the owner of Quick N Shine Auto Detail, working with celebrities such as the Wayans family. On February 24, 2009, Sayyed took his own life on Burnside Ave, Los Angeles. Due to Yusuf IV's pending murder trial, the Bey family didn't publish any obituary notices in Los Angeles.

=== 2006 bankruptcy ===
On October 24, 2006, YBMB filed for Chapter 11 bankruptcy. With $900,000 in debts, owed mostly to the mortgage holder, the bakery building was about to be foreclosed upon. The remaining debt, $200,000, was owed to the Internal Revenue Service (IRS). The day after the murder of Chauncey Bailey, on August 3, 2007, Judge Edward Jellen ordered the case to be converted to Chapter 7 liquidation effective August 9.

==== Political fallout ====
It was revealed that three local prominent elected officials wrote letters in July 2007 to Judge Jellen asking him not to dissolve YBMB to pay off creditors. Congresswoman Barbara Lee, Oakland Mayor Ron Dellums, and California Assemblyman Sandré Swanson all wrote letters at the request of longtime YBMB associate Ali Saleem Bey. Lee later expressed regret for her support. Dellums' office offered the explanation that Ali said that he hoped to gain control of YBMB, and return it to its historical roots. Swanson's letter was dated July 17, 2007 and his office first admitted to having "made a mistake", and also stated that Swanson was not aware of the bakery leaders' legal problems. However, later Swanson's office stated that the letter was a routine response to a routine request such as they receive from small businesses, and that the earlier statement did not represent the official position of the assemblyman.

Elmhurst-East Oakland City Council member Larry Reid said that he had refused the request by Bey to write a similar letter of support for YBMB in July, because the bakery had failed to repay the 1996 loan and because of the well-publicized criminal charges that had been brought against Bey organization leaders by that time, including the 2005 liquor store incidents. Reid said he respected the old guard of the bakery represented by John and Ali Bey, but that was not enough.

=== 2006 Health Code violations ===
On December 19, 2006, YBMB's San Pablo Avenue bakery headquarters received four "major" health code violations, with dangerously unsanitary conditions, during a restaurant inspection by the Alameda County Environmental Health Department. The conditions were grave enough to risk immediate closure, if not fixed immediately, according to department policy. However, the bakery remained open, and no follow-up inspection was recorded by the department. The major violations included issues with grease, lack of smooth and cleanable surfaces, lack of adequate stove hood venting, and inadequate lighting. In addition inspectors cited four minor violations involving employee behavior and cleanliness.

=== May 2007 kidnapping ===
Three men associated with YBMB, including Yusuf IV, later confessed to a May 17, 2007 kidnapping of two women, a mother and daughter, and tortured the latter, who they believed was a drug dealer. According to court records and a police affidavit, 20-year-old Joshua Bey and 21-year-old Tamon Oshun Halfin staked out the women at a bingo parlor at Foothill Square in East Oakland. Halfin and Joshua admitted that Yusuf IV ordered them to keep watch, and to notify him when the two women left. The men believed that both the women and a male friend had a lot of cash, which the Beys and Halfin were trying to get for the bakery.

Joshua and Halfin were riding in a fake police car, with flashing lights, which was registered to Yusuf IV. The car pulled the women over on Interstate 580. Wearing dark clothing and masks, the two men took the women at gunpoint into the fake police car. A third man was behind the wheel. The men covered the women's heads and drove off, while the third man followed them, driving the women's car. They ended up at a house in the 6800 block of Avenal Avenue, a couple miles from the bingo parlor. Police said that YBMB owned the house and used it as a rental. The mother was left inside the car while the daughter was taken inside the house, where she was tortured, hit in the head and knee with a hard object, and was threatened with being set on fire. An Oakland Police officer in the area that night looking for a stolen car spotted the fake police car with the mother inside and, when he stopped to investigate, the men fled the house. The daughter broke a window of the house and called for help. The mother was found unharmed. A cell phone found in the house belonged to Joshua.

Joshua and Halfin were later among those arrested in the raid on the bakery. Police later held Yusuf IV without bail for kidnapping for ransom in the case.

=== July 2007 Roberson Homicide ===
On July 7, 2007, Odel Roberson, a relative of Alfonza Phillips III, Antar Bey's killer, was murdered in the 1000 block of 60th Street. At the time of his death, Roberson was a homeless drug addict who often sought food handouts from YBMB. He had no involvement in Antar Bey's murder, but after their attempts to kill Alfonza Phillip's father failed, Devaughndre Broussard and Antone Mackey were instructed by Yusuf Bey IV to murder Roberson as "revenge" for the murder of Bey. The men lured Roberson around a corner with the promise of drugs, after which Broussard shot him at least eight times. The court later stated that "Broussard never had problems with Roberson and had no reason to kill him except that Bey told him to do it."

=== July 2007 Wills Homicide ===
On July 12, 2007, another victim, Mike Wills Jr., was gunned down in the 6200 block of San Pablo Avenue. On August 6, the police stated that the two murders were committed with an AK-47 found at the bakery during the August raid. Devaughndre Broussard later said that Antoine Mackey killed Wills because he was white and that Mackey and Bey had been inspired by the racially motivated Zebra murders, which Yusuf Bey IV allegedly enthusiastically endorsed as "giving White people a taste of their own medicine".

== Murder of Chauncey Bailey ==
Before his shooting death in August 2007, editor Chauncey Bailey of the Oakland Post was working on a story about the finances of YBMB, involving its pending bankruptcy. Ali Saleem Bey was Bailey's source for the story, which the Post withheld on the belief that it was not yet ready for publication.

According to Ali, YBMB had been seized from its rightful heirs in a coup, through fraud and forgery, by a younger branch of the family, that included Antar Bey and Yusef Bey IV. Ali revealed that in June 2005, John Bey, a former head of the Bey security service who had tried to expose the fraud behind the coup, fled Oakland with his family after an attempt on his life in a shooting outside his home. In 2005, Antar mortgaged the bakery property, to cover back taxes and other debt, and then defaulted, which led to threat of foreclosure.

On the morning of August 2, 2007, Bailey was murdered in Downtown Oakland by Devaughndre Broussard, a 19-year-old YBMB handyman who was on probation for a San Francisco robbery conviction. Broussard was a close associate of Yusuf Bey IV and deeply involved with the activities of YBMB. Prior to the murder, Bey described Bailey to Broussard and Antoine Mackey as “the motherfucker who killed my father," an undeniably false statement, since Bey's father had died of cancer. Following this, Bey IV also told Broussard and Mackey that Bailey worked for the Oakland Post and told them to follow him and learn his routine because he wanted to "take him out." Later, he offered both men "credit hook-ups" in exchange for the hit on Bailey, telling them that it needed to be done quickly, as he was afraid Bailey's exposé of the bakery's underground activities and sordid past would be published soon.

The California Court of Appeal later described the event in People v. Mackey (233 Cal. App. 4th 32 (Cal. Ct. App. 2015), paragraph 15) as follows:

""Mackey and Broussard drove along the bus route until they saw Bailey walking. Mackey said that location was “too hot,” so they drove ahead, parked near 14th and Alice Streets, and waited for Bailey to arrive. When Broussard saw Bailey approach that intersection, he jumped out of the van, ran across the street to where Bailey was, and shot him twice in the torso at close range and started to run back across the street. Then he remembered that Bey had made it clear they should be sure Bailey was dead, so he returned to Bailey lying on the ground, fired a third shot into Bailey’s face, and ran back to the van. After the shooting Mackey drove them back to the Bakery, where they went upstairs and told Bey, “It’s done.”"

Witnesses described the killer, later identified as Broussard, as wearing a ski mask and all black clothing, arriving in a white Ford Aerostar without license plates, and approaching Bailey with a Mossberg shotgun. The shotgun was later discovered to have been stolen in 2005 by Yusuf Bey IV. After the shooting, Broussard escaped in the van.

Broussard initially denied repeatedly that he had killed Bailey, including during an interview with 60 Minutes. But eventually, Broussard admitted to police that he did in fact ambush and murder Bailey on Bey's orders and implicated Antoine Mackey as the driver of the van during the murder.

== Closure of bakery and conviction ==
The Alameda County Health Department closed YBMB after rat droppings were found inside the bakery and dead rats were found on the rooftop, along with other waste which was leaking into drainage lines. As a result, police officers called in Oakland's Vector Control during the raid, along with the State of California Department of Fish and Game and the Alameda Country District Attorney's Office environmental crimes unit. Pending fines could have reached up to $5,000 per day.

On August 4, 2007, Broussard was booked on suspicion of murder for the killing of Bailey, having told police detectives that he considered himself "a good soldier". Yusuf IV was also arrested that day on the outstanding San Francisco warrant, and held without bail in the May kidnapping-for-ransom case. His brother Joshua, Halfin, and one of the other arrestees from the morning prior were being held in connection with the earlier kidnappings, including the assault of a woman in May.

On August 7, Broussard was arraigned in Alameda County Superior Court for Bailey's murder, and also charged with being a convicted felon in possession of a firearm and with having a prior felony conviction from San Francisco. He chose to plead guilty and testify against Bey and Mackey. In August 2011, he was sentenced to 25 years in state prison. On June 9, 2011, Yusuf IV was convicted on three counts of first-degree murder. Antoine Mackey was convicted of two counts of first-degree murder the same day. Both were sentenced to life in prison without the possibility of parole on August 26, 2011. In 2015, a state appeals court upheld both of their convictions and sentences.

On June 5, 2025, Broussard was released from prison on parole. He must remain within 70 miles of San Luis Obispo.

== See also ==
- Yusuf Bey
- Chauncey Bailey
- Nation of Islam
