= Murder of Chauncey Bailey =

2007 murder in Oakland, California, US

- Location: Oakland, California, U.S.
- Date: August 2, 2007
- Attack type: Assassination by shooting
- Victim: Chauncey Bailey
- Perpetrators: Devaughndre Broussard, assisted by Antoine Mackey, on the orders of Yusuf Bey IV

Chauncey Bailey, an American journalist and the editor-in-chief of The Oakland Post, was assassinated on a downtown Oakland street on August 2, 2007. He was the victim of a crime syndicate. Bailey's death outraged fellow journalists, who joined together to create the Chauncey Bailey Project dedicated to continuing his work and uncovering the facts of his murder.

In June 2011, Yusuf Bey IV, the owner of Your Black Muslim Bakery (YBMB), was convicted of ordering Bailey's murder, along with other charges, and sentenced to three life terms in prison. An associate of Bey's, Antoine Mackey, who also worked for YBMB and previously participated in various criminal activities with other Bakery members, was also convicted for participating in Bailey's murder. A third man, bakery handyman Devaughndre Broussard, had earlier confessed to being the triggerman. Bailey was the first American journalist killed for domestic reporting since 1976.

== Circumstances ==
Chauncey Bailey had been working on a story about the finances of Your Black Muslim Bakery (YBMB), which was on the verge of bankruptcy. Oakland Post publisher Paul Cobb later revealed that, prior to Bailey's killing, Cobb had withheld a story that Bailey had written earlier from publication, saying only that it was about "things like" what happened to Bailey. Cobb later stated that the police had asked him not to reveal anything about the matter. A former YBMB employee, Ali Saleem Bey – who is not a relative of the bakery's owner, but who adopted the Bey name – revealed that he was Bailey's source for the withheld story, which the Post had decided was not ready for publication. Bailey had asked Ali Bey to give him information for the story.

According to Ali Bey, YBMB had been seized from its rightful heirs in a coup, through fraud and forgery, by a younger branch of the Bey family, including Antar Bey and Yusuf Bey IV, the bakery's CEO. In June 2005, John Bey, the former head of the Bey security service who had tried to expose the fraud behind the YBMB coup, fled Oakland with his family after an attempt on his life in a shooting outside his home. In 2005, Antar mortgaged the YBMB property to cover back taxes and other debt, and then defaulted, which led to threat of foreclosure. An attorney for the Post confirmed that Bailey had been working on the story about the "financial status of the organization" and including the possibly criminal "activities of a number of people who were working in the organization".

On October 24, 2006, YBMB filed for Chapter 11 bankruptcy. With $900,000 in debts, owed mostly to the mortgage holder, the bakery building was about to be foreclosed upon. The remaining debt, $200,000, was owed to the Internal Revenue Service (IRS). The day after Bailey's death, on August 3, 2007, Judge Edward Jellen ordered the case to be converted to Chapter 7 liquidation effective August 9.

== Final days ==
By the summer of 2007, Bailey was living in an apartment near the south end of Lake Merritt, not far from Downtown Oakland. His regular morning routine involved walking to work along 14th Street, which included a stop to eat breakfast at a McDonald's restaurant at corner of Jackson Street.

On the morning of August 2, Bailey was being followed by a white Ford Aerostar van carrying Devaughndre Broussard, a 19-year-old YBMB employee who was on probation for a San Francisco robbery conviction, and driven by Antoine Mackey, a 21-year-old YBMB employee who was on probation for selling cocaine. Broussard had worked at the bakery as a handyman and cook between August 2006 and March 2007, before leaving to find other work. He was rehired at the bakery in July 2007. Mackey had only been working at the bakery since May 2007.

=== Assassination ===
Broussard spotted Bailey leaving the McDonald's restaurant. After the van was parked on Alice Street, Broussard – wearing a ski mask and dark clothing – approached Bailey at the 200 block of 14th Street, wielding a Mossberg shotgun. One witness said Bailey said: "Please don't kill me." This witness claimed he recognized Bailey, and that he was in trouble, but stopped in his tracks when he saw the shotgun. Other witnesses said Broussard fired at least three rounds from the shotgun. Broussard's first shot hit Bailey in the chest. He then stood over Bailey and fired again at his face, before finally firing a coup de grâce to make sure he was dead. Broussard then ran back to the waiting van and Mackey drove away. Bailey was pronounced dead at the scene.

Bailey was survived by his father, three of his four siblings, and his teenage son living in southern California. A funeral Mass for Bailey was held at the East Oakland St. Benedict's Catholic Church on the morning of August 8, 2007, with an overflow crowd of 700 in attendance, including a line of people outside for more than an hour into the service. Attendees included Oakland Mayor Ron Dellums, U.S. Representative Barbara Lee, and well-known local attorney John Burris. Bailey was buried at Holy Sepulchre Cemetery in nearby Hayward.

== Suspects ==
=== Shooter ===
Devaughndre Broussard grew up in San Francisco's Western Addition district. In January 2006, at age 18, he pleaded guilty to an assault charge and served a first-time offender sentence of one year in San Francisco County Jail. Upon release, he was further ordered to three years of supervised probation. In addition to being on probation, Broussard was also wanted on an outstanding failure-to-appear warrant related to charges involving a 2006 assault with a firearm in San Francisco.

On the night of August 1, 2007, Broussard first went looking for Bailey at his apartment complex near the south end of Lake Merritt. Early on the next morning of August 2, Broussard looked for Bailey at his office at the Post, but Bailey had not yet arrived. Broussard also went looking for Bailey twice at his apartment complex again that morning. At 7:17 a.m. an AC Transit bus driver reported seeing a man who may have been Broussard standing near Bailey's apartment complex at First Avenue and International Boulevard with a shotgun. The driver called his dispatcher, who reported the incident to the Alameda County Sheriff's Office. The driver continued on his route, and deputies responded to the location, but could not locate the man in their search.

=== Yusuf Bey IV ===
Yusuf Bey IV
- Born: Yusuf Bey IV; 1986 (age 39–40); Oakland, California, U.S.
- Occupation: Baker
- Status: Incarcerated
- Allegiance: Black Muslims
- Criminal charge: Murder
- Penalty: Life imprisonment

Yusuf Bey IV was born in Oakland in 1986. He was the son of Yusuf Bey, the founder of YBMB, and Daulet Bey, one of multiple women who the elder Yusuf took as his wives. His life was marred by arrests and accusations of serious crimes. Yusuf's father was said to have fathered forty-two children by different women at the time of his death in 2003. He had one legal wife, Farieda Bey, but no other formal marriages took place. Bey claimed he had "spiritually" adopted his followers, who all took his surname. People who worked for YBMB were considered "members" of the business and the mosque from which the bakery had grown.

From a young age, Yusuf had run-ins with the law, including at the age of 15 in 2001, when he was arrested in El Cerrito for failing to stop at a stop sign and possessing a loaded firearm magazine.

=== Battle for control of the bakery ===
After the death of the elder Yusuf, his follower and designated successor, Waajid Aljawwaad (who sometimes used the additional last name of Bey), became the CEO of YBMB. However, on February 27, 2004, Aljawwaad failed to arrive for work at the bakery. His body, bound with electrical tape and wrapped in a tarpaulin, was found in Oakland Hills in July of that year. No one was ever charged with the murder.

Antar Bey, Daulet and Yusuf Bey's son and the older brother of Yusuf Bey IV, seized control of YBMB. In an effort to keep the business afloat, he took out $700,000 in loans, but was then killed in a carjacking in Oakland in October 2005. Authorities suspected Yusuf IV of ordering Antar's execution, but this could never be proven, and eventually Oakland police charged a man unrelated to the bakery with the murder. After Antar's death, Yusuf IV took full control of YBMB.

==== Bakery ownership years (2005–2007) ====
Yusuf IV seemed primarily interested in YBMB's profits and the power over the members of the business his father had engendered, not the day-to-day operation of the business itself, and the court would later note that "the bakery did not thrive" under his leadership. He alternately took money from YBMB and conducted various fraudulent operations to support himself and the business. This eventually forced the bakery to file for bankruptcy in 2006, though the proceedings dragged on until Bey was arrested in 2007.

Yusuf IV continued his father's practice of delivering fiery Black Muslim sermons to bakery followers, including one videotaped sermon from July 2007, where he asserted, "We fight the government, we fight the police, we fight our own families, we fight our own people, and we fight Caucasian people daily—just to do right."

Some of the crimes Bey IV committed during this period included theft by deception and forgery involving the purchase of several cars; fraudulent sub-prime home loan applications; possession of a firearm after attempting to open a checking account using forged identification; and a bizarre kidnapping and assault on a woman Yusuf IV believed was connected with drug dealers who owed him money, or whom he could rob. Despite several arrests, he remained free and flouted subpoenas and court dates. His lawyer said at the time, "The view was, 'We're Black Muslims, we can do anything we want.' They got sucked in. I thought it was 'acting out' behavior. But it caused just a whirlwind of trouble."

==== Criminal record ====
Some of Yusuf Bey IV's charges and arrests include:

- In November 2005, Yusuf IV was charged with grand theft for fraud connected with the purchase of a 2002 Mercedes from a Vallejo car dealership. He used a stolen identity to buy the car and pleaded no contest when the crime was discovered. A Solano County judge allowed him to remain free.
- That same month, a group of men in suits, presumably led by Yusuf IV, stormed two Muslim-owned stores that sold liquor. The men destroyed wine in cases and groceries. He later claimed, "If you say you're a Muslim, you should have the action of a Muslim," and that alcohol was "killing our people". During one of these incidents, Bey also stole the Mossburg shotgun that would later be used in Bailey's murder.
- In 2006, Yusuf IV was charged with assault with a deadly weapon after he tried to run over the bouncer of a San Francisco strip club from which he'd been ejected.
- In June 2006, Yusuf IV purchased a home in Oakland using falsified information. The sub-prime loan involved a first and second mortgage, and investigators later theorized the motive was to obtain money from the home's equity. The loan went into default in October. Yusuf IV used his own Social Security number but a driver's license with a falsified name for the loan paperwork. Later, investigators discovered that he and his associates had purchased a total of five homes, most of which were in default.
- That same month, Yusuf IV and associates used false information to buy three cars from a San Bruno dealership, which later resulted in charges of grand theft. Yusuf IV used the same name to purchase the cars that he had used to purchase the house in Oakland. One of the accomplices later said he could not remember using a false name or several other details of the fraudulent car purchase or the liquor store vandalism, in which he also allegedly participated.
- In May 2007, Bey IV and four men kidnapped a woman known as a drug dealer and her mother and took them to the home of Bey's brother-in-law. The men beat the blindfolded women and demanded money. While the crime was in progress, police saw a Ford Crown Victoria, a car often used by police, outside the house and grew suspicious. Police went to the door and the men fled on foot, leaving their cars behind. The police confiscated the vehicles as evidence and Joshua Bey, Bey IV's half-brother, was arrested. Since the arrest, Bey IV has alternately admitted and denied various aspects of this crime.
- Bey IV wanted Alfonza Phillips Sr., the father of the man who killed Antar Bey, executed. But because Bey IV's accomplice Devaughndre Broussard could not find Phillips, Bey IV told him to kill another relative of the carjacker, Odel Roberson. In July 2007, Broussard, who was 19, found Roberson. Antoine Mackey, another member of the bakery, handed him a rifle, and Broussard shot the unarmed man. He said at trial that he had fired eight or ten rounds and carried out the murder "because Yusuf Bey IV told me to".
- Later in 2007, Bey IV, Antoine Mackey and Devaughndre Broussard were driving around Oakland discussing the "Zebra" murders. Bey IV or Broussard saw Michael Wills, a white man who worked as a chef, returning to work on foot after purchasing a pack of cigarettes. Bey IV and his accomplices discussed who should kill Wills and Mackey volunteered. He got out of the car and shot Wills six times. The three left the scene and returned to the bakery compound.

=== Antoine Mackey ===
In May 2007, Antoine Mackey began working at YBMB after moving to Oakland from San Francisco, where he had obtained a lengthy criminal record for crimes that included weapons violations and had been shot on multiple occasions in what police later indicated were likely gang-related incidents. He quickly became involved in criminal activities with Yusuf Bey VI and Devaughndre Broussard, including allegedly being present for the murder of Odel Roberson, which was ordered by Bey, and allegedly being the triggerman in the murder of Michael Wills, both crimes for which he was later convicted. In 2007, he was convicted of selling cocaine, and in 2008, he was convicted of burglary.

Mackey's role in Bailey's murder was not initially known, but later evidence emerged that he drove Broussard to and from the scene, was present for the murder itself, and was a participant in the prior planning and surveillance of Bailey leading up to the killing.

== Investigation and trial for murder ==
On the day of the killing Oakland Police and Crime Stoppers of Oakland offered up to $25,000 in reward money for information leading to the arrest of the killer.

Beginning early at 5 a.m. on the following morning of August 3, 2007, more than 200 Oakland police officers and SWAT team members armed with search warrants closed off a number of blocks of San Pablo Avenue, a major thoroughfare in North Oakland. The area of focus included homes and the business properties of Your Black Muslim Bakery, which operated two business locations on either side of the street between Stanford Avenue and 59th Street. The group was a Black Muslim splinter organization founded by Yusuf Bey, and at the time was led by his son Yusuf Bey IV. The pre-dawn raids followed a two-month investigation into a variety of violent crimes, including kidnapping and murder. Police used stun grenades and broke down doors to gain entry. In a news conference later that day, Oakland Deputy Police Chief Howard Jordan said that several weapons and other evidence of value linked the killing of Chauncey Bailey to members of the group. Police also recovered spent ammunition from the rooftops, and detained 19 people for questioning.

In addition to the bakeries, the police also raided nearby homes. In the 1000 block of 59th Street, police recovered the shotgun used in the killing of Bailey in a closet of the home where Broussard was also detained. The rear yard of the home connected directly to the bakery property. Police also raided a home in the 900 block of Aileen Street a few blocks east of the bakery. Of the 19 detainees on that morning, five were arrested along with Broussard, and Yusuf Bey IV on probable cause arrest warrants, along with other outstanding arrest warrants stemming from the prior investigations.

Broussard was booked on suspicion of murder on August 4, 2007, for the killing of Bailey, having told police detectives that he considered himself "a good soldier". Though other charges were made against those arrested, none of them were initially charged with Bailey's murder. On August 7, Broussard was arraigned in Alameda County Superior Court on charges of murder and possession of a firearm by a convicted felon.

Broussard initially confessed to killing Bailey, then recanted his confession. In a 2008 60 Minutes interview, Broussard claimed he was coerced by Yusuf Bey IV to plead guilty for the benefit of the bakery and others arrested. In an interview for CBS News, Broussard said that the Oakland Police put him and Bey IV together in a room, and that Bey IV convinced him to plead guilty for the purpose of releasing other murder suspects. He later pled guilty to manslaughter charges in exchange for a 25-year sentence and full testimony at the trial of Bey IV and others. Broussard was released on parole in 2025.

In June 2008, a videotape of Bey IV in custody whispering to his half-brother Joshua Bey and another bakery associate, Tamon Halfin, and disclosing details of Bailey's murder was obtained and posted by the Chauncey Bailey Project. Journalists from the Chauncey Bailey Project created a transcription of the conversation which seemed to indicate Bey was involved in Bailey's murder.

A grand jury indicted Bey IV for ordering the execution of Chauncey Bailey in April 2009, almost two years after the murder. He was also charged with ordering the deaths of Roberson and Wills, along with an additional charge of firing a weapon at an occupied vehicle. In the same indictment, Antoine Mackey was also charged with the murders of Bailey, Roberson, and Wills.

Broussard testified for the prosecution at the trial of Bey IV and Antoine Mackey in 2011. He stated in court that Bey ordered him to find, track and kill Bailey before the journalist could print his latest article on the bakery.

On June 9, 2011, Bey IV and Mackey were both convicted by a trial jury of multiple counts of murder and sentenced to life in prison without the possibility of parole. Yusuf Bey IV was found guilty of three counts of first-degree murder.

In 2013, Bey's attorney, Lorna Brown, was convicted of smuggling documents out of jail for him. One of the documents, a hit list ordering an associate to kill a witness, was intercepted by police before the associate could carry out the murder.

In 2015, a state appeals court upheld the convictions of Yusuf Bey IV and Antoine Mackey.

Bey IV also threatened former bakery followers to intimidate them from testifying against him. Based on recorded calls between Bey IV and follower Kahlil Raheem, Bey first cajoled and then warned Raheem not to testify against him. As the trial progressed, allegations of intimidation by Bey IV and other former bakery members persisted. The Contra Costa Times editorialized on April 30, 2011 that the intimidation must stop and that the judge, Thomas Reardon, along with bailiffs and the sheriff should get control of the trial to allow justice to be done. Some witnesses called to testify changed their story from the original information they gave the police or said they did not remember what happened. A man who worked at the convenience store that Bey IV allegedly attacked with his followers said he did not remember over 50 times at trial. Even Broussard testified later that he did not remember Bey IV giving him specific orders to kill Odel Roberson or Chauncey Bailey.

== See also ==
- Chauncey Bailey
- Your Black Muslim Bakery
- Yusuf Bey
- Nation of Islam
