= Yusuf Bey =

African-American activist and religious leader (1935–2003)

- Born: Joseph Stephens; December 21, 1935; Greenville, Texas, U.S.
- Died: September 30, 2003 (aged 67); Oakland, California, U.S.
- Occupations: Activist and religious leader
- Organization: Your Black Muslim Bakery
- Title: Bey
- Children: 42+

Yusuf Bey (born Joseph Stephens; December 21, 1935 – September 30, 2003) was an American Black Muslim activist and leader who was a member of the Lost-Found Nation of Islam, an offshoot of Louis Farrakhan's Nation of Islam (NOI).

After discovering the teachings of Elijah Muhammed in the 1960s, he adopted the name Yusuf Bey and moved to Oakland, California, and then Santa Barbara, California, where in 1968 he opened a bakery. The bakery moved to Oakland by 1971. Renamed Your Black Muslim Bakery, it became the center of a local Black nationalist community. Held out at the time as a model of African-American economic self-sufficiency, the business fell apart after Bey's death and a series of murders linked to criminal activities.

== Biography ==
=== Early years ===
Bey was born and raised in Greenville, Texas. As a student in the early 1950s, he moved with his family to Oakland, California, where he attended Oakland Technical High School, and then enlisted for four years in the U.S. Air Force. He first obtained a cosmetology degree and ran beauty salons in neighboring Berkeley and then in the southern city of Santa Barbara before going into the bakery business instead. Having converted to Islam in 1964, Bey founded the Islamic bakery in Santa Barbara in 1968. The group was not affiliated with Louis Farrakhan's movement, the Nation of Islam, though early connections and similarities were evident. Nation of Islam minister Keith Muhammad, of East Oakland's Muhammad Mosque #26, stated that the two organizations are distinct and separate.

The baked goods Bey sold were in accordance with strict Muslim diets and free of refined sugar, fats, and preservatives. He named the business Your Black Muslim Bakery on the personal recommendation of his spiritual guide, the Nation of Islam leader Elijah Muhammad. In 1971, Bey moved the bakery to Oakland.

=== Black Muslim era ===
Although the bakery was not affiliated with the Nation of Islam, Yusuf Bey's activism originated with that group. After he came to Oakland in the early 1970s, Bey became a member of the 200-member Nation of Islam Mosque No. 26 in San Francisco, which had a strict fundamentalist reputation of strictly adhering to the edicts from the Nation's Chicago headquarters. At that time Bey went by the name Capt. Joseph X.

Prior to establishing Mosque No. 26B, Joseph Stephens (he had not yet changed his name to Bey) and his brother, Minister Billy X, opened a mosque in Santa Barbara, California. He became the Secretary of the mosque and his brother was the minister.

Together with Bey's brother, Minister Billy X Stephens, the two men then received permission to establish a new congregation, Mosque No. 26B, in Oakland. Around that time the two Bey brothers associated with a single young woman named Capt. Felicia X, who was the head of a training program for women in the San Francisco mosque. Felicia X then defected to the brothers' new Mosque No. 26B. Minister Henry Majied, the leader of Mosque No. 26, then retaliated with charges against Felicia X, sparking a bitter rivalry between the two mosques.

Part of the rivalry stemmed from competition over selling of Muhammad Speaks newspapers on the streets. Bey's group outsold the San Francisco group, but did it partly by selling to whites, violating the Nation's written policy to not sell where whites might buy it. Minister Henry retaliated by ordering his members to confiscate any copies of the newspaper if they saw any of Bey's group selling them downtown to whites. As a result, Elijah Muhammad expelled Minister Henry, for ordering Muslims to "attack" other Muslims.

After 1972, the Beys and the bakery split off from Mosque No. 26B, and from the Nation of Islam. Bey's brother, Minister Billy, returned to the Nation of Islam before the Million Man March in 1995. Currently, he remains active with the movement where he lives in Las Vegas, Nevada.

=== Soul Beat era ===
By the mid-1980s, Bey appeared regularly on a local Oakland Soul Beat cable television lecture program, True Solutions, during which he broadcast his hour-long sermons every week on station KSBT. On the program Bey also promoted the bakery and frequently expounded on the need for the economic self-reliance and "knowledge of self" of African-Americans, whom he lectured the audience as being the "Original Man", a racially charged idea deriving from Nation of Islam doctrine. Bey repeated the NOI doctrine of Yakub, which teaches that the non-black races are the result of a 6,000-year-old genetic experiment conducted in a mythic black utopia on the Arabian peninsula, which "peopled the world with "blue-eyed devils." Bey even went as far as to proclaim repeatedly in his sermons that the black man "is God," essentially avatars of Allah, and the white man "is the Devil."

=== Death of Akbar Bey ===
In 1994, Yusuf's son Akbar Bey was shot four times and killed by a local drug dealer associate outside the old Omni nightclub near the corner of Shattuck Avenue and 50th Street. Court records showed the pathologist's conclusion that Akbar Bey was high on heroin or morphine at the time of his death. An Oakland police lieutenant described Akbar Bey as "a little street thug" once seen well-armed and wearing a bulletproof vest in a blatant show of force to the police. Three months before his killing, Akbar Bey had been charged with felony counts of carrying a concealed weapon and evading the police, resulting in a car chase and crash at 44th Street and Market Street.

=== Crimes of Nedir and Abaz Bey ===
On March 4, 1994, followers and self-proclaimed "adopted" sons of Bey (they were never legally adopted), Nedir Bey and Abaz Bey were involved in the torture and beating of a Nigerian home-seller in an apartment on the 500 block of 24th Street in Oakland over a real estate deal. The complex served as a compound for the Bey organization. The two Beys and two other men were charged with felony counts of assault, robbery, and false imprisonment. A year later, following a plea deal, Nedir Bey served six months of home detention, and Abaz Bey got eight months' home detention.

Primarily through lobbying and orchestrating by Nedir, who was the public face of the Bey organization, Yusuf Bey cultivated the patronage of Oakland's civic, political, and religious leaders. In 1994, he ran unsuccessfully for mayor against then-incumbent Oakland Mayor Elihu Harris, gaining 5% of the vote.

=== Felony charges and warrant ===
Yusuf Bey's detractors—notably East Bay Express journalist Chris Thompson—accused Bey of cultism, corruption, and antisemitism. Many accusations of physical and sexual abuse, including rape and incest, sustained by DNA evidence, were made against Bey, culminating in felony charges that were pending at the time of his death.

On September 19, 2002, Bey turned himself in when a warrant was issued for his arrest, charged with 27 counts in the alleged rapes of four girls under the age of 14. One of the victims gave testimony that Bey had begun to rape her when she was only 8. The cases were pending trial into the following year. The oldest allegation was that, beginning twenty years earlier, he had serially raped a pre-teen girl who came under the foster care of Bey and his wife Nora Bey. In her request for a temporary restraining order one month prior to the arrest, the woman claimed that Bey's wife also knew of the serial rapes, but did nothing. The girl gave birth to a child at the age of 13 in 1982. Oakland's district attorney's office claimed to have conclusive DNA evidence identifying Bey as the father.

Through interviews, birth certificates, sworn depositions and other records in Alameda and surrounding counties it was determined that Bey had at least 42 children with 14 women and girls. The youngest of the mothers was 12 when became pregnant with the first of three children she would have with Bey.

Bey's first attorney in the criminal case was Andrew Dósa, who also represented him in a companion family law case for custody and support brought by the woman. Attorney Lorna Patton Brown represented Bey in the criminal case at the time of his death.

=== Death ===
On September 30, 2003, before trial began on the first case, Bey died from cancer at the age of 67 in Oakland, California.

== Related figures ==
=== Yusuf Bey IV ===
Bey's son Yusuf Bey IV has been the subject of a series of civil claims and criminal investigations. Investigative reports in 2006 and 2007 uncovered his links to at least three murders, widespread housing and welfare fraud, indentured servitude, and physical and sexual abuse. In 2011, Bey IV was convicted of ordering three murders, including the murder of Oakland journalist Chauncey Bailey, and was sentenced to life in prison.

=== Sayyed Yusuf Bey ===
Sayyed Yusuf "Weedy" Bey was one of Yusuf Bey's older sons and his mother was Shamsun. Sayyed graduated from Elijah Educational Center in 1994. He worked as a cameraman, filming his father's weekly television program True Solutions. Sayyed also worked as a master baker at landmark family business Your Black Muslim Bakery. In 1997, he moved to Los Angeles and worked with the Wayans family to run and eventually own Quick N Shine Auto Detail. On February 24, 2009, after becoming gravely ill, Sayyed took his own life and was found in his home on Burnside Ave by his ex-girlfriend. His body was shipped to Oakland, California and due to the nature of his head trauma, the family had a closed casket ceremony. Sayyed was buried next to his father and brothers Akbar and Antar in a Rolling Hills, California Cemetery.

== See also ==
- Chauncey Bailey
