= 1994 Oakland mayoral election =

- June 7, 1994 (first round); November 8, 1994 (runoff)

Candidate	Elihu Harris	Ted Dang	Mary V. King
Party	Democratic	Nonpartisan	Nonpartisan
First round vote	22,785	18,255	13,067
First round percentage	37.20%	29.80%	21.33%
Runoff vote	64,831	35,786	eliminated
Runoff vote	64.43%	35.57%	eliminated
Candidate	Yusuf Bey
Party	Nonpartisan
First round vote	3,177
First round percentage	5.19%
Runoff vote	eliminated
Runoff vote	eliminated
Mayor before election
Elihu Harris
Democratic
Elected mayor
Elihu Harris
Democratic

The 1994 Oakland mayoral election was held on June 7, 1994, and November 8, 1994, to elect the mayor of Oakland, California. It saw the reelection of Elihu Harris.

Since no candidate secured a majority in the first round, a runoff election was held between the top-two finishers, Harris and Ted Dang.

== Candidates ==
Advanced to runoff

- Ted Dang, real estate developer
- Elihu Harris, incumbent mayor

Eliminated in first round

- Hugh E. Bassette
- Arthur R. Boone
- Yusuf Bey, black Muslim activist
- General Philip Haymon
- Mary V. King, member of the Alameda County Board of Supervisors
- Michael Joseph Kinane
- Cliff Sherman

== Background ==
Incumbent first-term mayor Elihu Harris had been elected the city's second-ever African American mayor in the 1990 election.

At the time, Oakland was one of the few large cities in the United States that had a "weak mayor" system of government. While the position of mayor had limited authority, the role still had ceremonial importance, and its occupants tended to have sway over important policy.

In Elihu Harris' first term, the city had been beset by numerous issues stemming from the damage of the 1989 Loma Prieta earthquake and the Oakland firestorm of 1991. The city's inefficient bureaucratic structure had hampered Harris' ability to lead a quick response to these disasters. Harris had also exhibited a low-key personality and absence of leadership. This, perhaps, helped foster an increase in anti-government sentiments in Oakland. Harris would often complain that he was the victim of unfair expectations, arguing that the weak mayor system made him incapable of meeting the public's expectations of him.

Oakland was also struggling with crime and economic issues.

Harris received credit for playing a role in putting many racial and ethnic minorities (such as Asian Americans and hispanics) in city government positions and on city commissions. This possibly helped to garner strong multiracial support for his reelection campaign.

Oakland had seen its registered voters identify as predominantly Democratic ever since the 1940s. liberal Democrats did not come to have electoral success in the city's municipal elections until the 1970s, when the city saw a shift in its municipal election patterns beginning with the 1977 election of Lionel Wilson as mayor. Ever since this shift, the city had favored liberal Democrats.

With Elihu Harris and his predecessor Lionel Wilson both being African American, the city had seen 18 consecutive years with an African American mayor.

== Campaign ==
=== First round ===
More than a dozen individuals entered the race. Not all, however, would ultimately appear on the ballot.

Mary V. King was initially seen as the foremost challenger of Harris. King would suffer from a lack of name recognition, and would fail to voice a consistent message or outline a clear policy agenda for her candidacy.

Ted Dang launched his candidacy in late February, becoming the thirteenth challenger to enter the race against Harris. Dang, a first-time candidate for elected office, had some experience in political activism, as well experience with the city's camber of commerce and experience on the city housing authority board. Upon entering the race, Dang was seen as a longshot, as he lacked major political experience, had not raised funds before launching his campaign, and announced his candidacy a mere four month before the initial round of the election.

Dang's campaign manager was Duane Baughman, who had previously worked as a lieutenant on the successful 1993 Los Angeles mayoral campaign of Richard Riordan. Baughman's strategy for Dangs campaign was to have Dang run in a similar lane to that which Riordan had run. On April 20, Dang released a 64-page "action plan", outlining his views on city management. The "action plan" took many conservative stances, and, in many ways, echoed the themes that Republican Party members such as Riordan and Rudy Giuliani of New York City and had used in recent years in their successful mayoral campaigns in Democratic-dominated cities. Oakland was also a predominantly Democratic city. Dang took stances such as hiring 100 additional police officers (to appear tough-on-crime), term-limited city council members to two terms, and freezing wages and cutting "exorbitant" salaries in order to decrease the city's spending (this would include cutting the mayor's salary by 10%). Dang was a strong critic of the city's government and elected officials. Dang promised to run the city like a business. He painted an image of a bloated municipal government, and focused heavily on appealing to fears about crime.

Dang characterized both Harris and King as fiscally irresponsible. He, falsely, accused them of having voted to approve pay raises for themselves. He also characterized them as "career politicians".

Early into his candidacy, Dang showed strength as a candidate, performing contrary to the expectations of political analysts. He joined King as a top challenger to Harris.

Fong received early support from Citizens of Oakland Against Taxes, a group focused on advocating for the repeal of the city's Lighting and Landscaping Assessment Tax (which taxed wealthy areas of the city in order to fund citywide lighting and landscaping expenses). This group had successfully gathered enough signatures to secure a ballot initiative on the repeal of this tax as part of the November elections. Dang received the endorsement of the Oakland Tribune editorial board on June 3, just four days before the June 7 election day.

Dang, himself an Asian American, failed to secure endorsements from many prominent Asian American figures in Oakland, and was actually discouraged to run by some. This lack of support from them was perhaps, in part, attributable to the fact that Dang had not involved himself in the successful effort in 1993 to redistrict the Oakland City Council in such a manner that an Asian-American majority district and a Latino-majority district would be created. This 1993 effort had prevailed amid much controversy, and had seen much organized public pressure on both sides. Elihu Harris, on the other hand, had been an ally of the efforts to pass this redistricting, and had, through providing his support for the redistricting plan, managed to receive the support of many of the city's prominent Asian Americans for his reelection.

Dang struggled in fundraising. Weeks before the June 7 first-round election day, he self-funded his campaign $100,000. He then utilized these funds to run mailers which attacked Harris and King.

Yusuf Bey's campaign rhetoric received criticism for being homophobic and antisemitic. The most widely reported incident of Bey's campaign was a May 13 fundraiser at the city's Calvin Simmons Theater, where guest speaker Khalid Abdul Muhammad gave a speech which attacked White people, Jews, conventional black leaders, and Pope John Paul II.

In the initial round, Harris would place first with 37% of the vote, which was regarded as a poor performance. Dang placed second with 29%. Mary V. King underperformed expectations, receiving 21% of the vote. With no candidate receiving a majority of the vote, a runoff would be held between Harris and Dang, the top-two finishers.

Analysis of the first-round vote showed that Dang had been supported strongly in more affluent "hill" parts of the city, while Harris performed strongly in most of the low-income and mid-income "flatland" parts of the city. Concerning to Harris, as he looked to the runoff, was that many of the areas where he had received the greatest share of the vote in the first round had low turnout.

The turnout in the first round was regarded to be low, at 31.7%.

=== Runoff ===
Despite having been considered to have performed weakly in the first round, Harris was regarded as the front-runner to win the runoff, as analysts anticipated that Mary V. King's supporters would largely migrate to his candidacy over Dang's. Additionally, while the turnout had been low, Oakland had a history of municipal elections having a lower turnout in June and increased turnout in November.

The runoff was anticipated by analysts to be contentious. This would prove to be the case, with Dang having a combative campaign style, and the election proving to be divisive.

In his June 7 election night remarks, Harris had complained about the negative campaigning Dang had conducted in the first round, commenting, " I never have been in a more bitter, negative campaign, nor ave I witnessed one in any community". He also accused Dang of dishonesty.

Racial tensions arose to some degree in the runoff. The first major instance where race was raised was when former mayor Lionel Wilson (who was the city's first African American mayor) commented at an NAACP gathering, "When I see Black folks tell me they’re gonna vote for a Chinese man, it makes me angry. . . . If Ted Dang wins, the White folks will be standing in line to take it away from us". Dang had, incidentally, supported Wilson as mayor, and had once been appointed by Wilson to the city's housing authority board. In the closing week of the campaign, Dang sent out mailers which received criticism by some for verging on racism, including once that included an extreme close-up image of Harris, that some Oakland residents argued was reminiscent of the tactics used in the Willie Horton ad run by the campaign of George H. W. Bush in the 1988 United States presidential election.

As the runoff election day approached, analysts projected the race as being very close.

Ultimately, Harris won a surprisingly large 65% victory in what was a high-turnout election.

Harris was credited with running a successful get-out-the-vote effort. Analysis demonstrate that, towards the end of the runoff campaign, a portion of Dang's support in the affluent "hill" parts of the city had dissipated. An exit poll conducted by Larry H. Shinagawa showed that Dang received 79.5% and Harris received 20.5% of the Asian American vote, while Harris received 86% and Dang received 14% of the African American vote. Harris won the majority of the white and Latino vote, which were seen as critical to either candidate's prospective victory in this election. Harris received 57.5% while Dang received 42.5% of the white vote, and Harris received 53.1% while Dang received 46.9% of the Latino vote.

The ballot initiative on repealing the Lighting Landscaping Assessment Tax, which Dang hoped could energize voters in a manner that would aid his candidacy, was overwhelmingly rejected by voters.

Dang's negative campaigning put off some voters, particularly in the final week when some mailers were seen as verging on racism. Oakland Tribune columnist William Wong, who before the election had predicted that Dang would win, retrospectively assessed that Dang had sabotaged his own chances by having permitted, "tasteless, borderline racist hit pieces to be mailed to voters during the last week of the campaign.

Timothy P. Fong would publish a paper in the June 1998 edition of the Journal of Asian American Studies which attributed Dang's defeat to three factors. The first was his failure as an Asian American candidate to mobilize the city's Asian American communities and interest groups. The second was Dang's conservative positioning while running for the mayoralty of a "liberal and socially-conscious community". Fong argues that Dang, who had described himself as being fiscally conservative, was too conservative to appeal to the majority of the city's electorate. The third was Dang's negative campaign tactics and the negative mailers his campaign had distributed, which Fong argues acted to increase racial tension. Fong argues that Dang would have needed to have fostered a broad multiracial coalition of support to have won the election.

== Results ==
=== First round results ===
The first round saw turnout in excess of thirty percent.

1994 Oakland mayoral election first round results
Candidate	Votes	%
Elihu Mason Harris (incumbent)	22,785	37.20
Ted W. Dang	18,255	29.80
Mary V. King	13,067	21.33
Yusuf Bey	3,177	5.19
Hugh E. Bassette	1,079	1.76
Cliff Sherman	914	1.49
Michael Joseph Kinane	777	1.27
Arthur R. Boone	761	1.24
General Philip Haymon	440	0.72
Total votes	61,255	

=== Runoff results ===
The runoff saw turnout in excess of sixty percent.

1994 Oakland mayoral election runoff results
Candidate	Votes	%
Elihu Mason Harris (incumbent)	64,831	64.43
Ted W. Dang	35,786	35.57
Total votes	100,617	100
