= Chauncey Bailey =

American journalist (1949–2007)

- An undated family photo of Bailey
- Born: Chauncey Wendell Bailey Jr. October 20, 1949; Oakland, California, U.S.
- Died: August 2, 2007 (aged 57); Oakland, California, U.S.
- Cause of death: Murder by shooting
- Education: Merritt College; San Jose State University
- Occupation: Journalist
- Notable credit(s): The Detroit News; Oakland Tribune
- Spouse: Robin Hardin (div.)
- Children: 1

Chauncey Wendell Bailey Jr. (October 20, 1949 – August 2, 2007) was an American journalist noted for his work primarily on issues of the African-American community. He served as editor-in-chief of the Oakland Post in Oakland, California, from June 2007 until his murder.

Bailey was shot dead on a Downtown Oakland street on August 2, 2007, the victim of a crime syndicate he was investigating for a story. His death outraged fellow journalists, who joined to create the Chauncey Bailey Project dedicated to continuing his work and uncovering the facts of his murder. In June 2011 Yusuf Bey IV, owner of the Your Black Muslim Bakery, and his associate Antoine Mackey were convicted of ordering Bailey's murder. A third man, bakery handyman Devaughndre Broussard, had earlier confessed to being the triggerman. Bailey was the first American journalist killed for domestic reporting since 1976.

== Biography ==
=== Early years ===
Chauncey Wendell Bailey Jr. was born in Oakland, California, into a Catholic family who were members of St. Benedict's Catholic Church on 82nd Avenue. His 37-year career in journalism included lengthy periods as a reporter at The Detroit News and the Oakland Tribune. He lived in East Oakland neighborhoods for many years and attended Hayward High School in the nearby city of Hayward. Bailey earned an associate degree from Oakland's old Merritt Community College in 1968, and a Bachelors in Journalism from San Jose State University in 1972.

=== Career ===
Bailey first wrote for the Oakland Post in 1970, and made his foray into television news that year as an on-air reporter with station KNTV in San Jose, California, where he continued through 1971. During the next three years he worked at the San Francisco Sun Reporter.

In the mid-1970s, Bailey moved to Hartford, Connecticut, to work on the Hartford Courant for three years. After working for a year on the rewrite desk at United Press International in Chicago, he returned to Oakland in 1978 and wrote for the California Voice through late 1980. Bailey again moved to Chicago, where he worked as a publicist for the nonprofit Comprand Inc., and then relocated to Washington, D.C. in 1981 to work for a year as press secretary for the freshman U.S. Representative Gus Savage, D-Ill. From 1982 Bailey spent the next decade as a reporter and columnist for the Detroit News, where he covered city government and worked on special projects. In 1992 he returned to Oakland as public affairs director and newscaster on Bay Area radio with station KDIA, which was co-owned by then mayor of Oakland, Elihu Harris and then California Assembly Speaker Willie Brown. During this era Bailey was seen throughout the 1990s as an interviewer and commentator on Soul Beat Television on the Oakland cable station KSBT, where he worked along with former Oakland actress Luenell. Bailey worked at the Oakland Tribune from 1993 until 2005. In the mid-1990s Bailey split from his wife.

In 2003 Bailey quit his program on Soul Beat after he failed in his attempt to buy the station. His program was canceled in 2004. In 2005 he began writing freelance travel stories for the Oakland Post. He became editor in June 2007, and then editor-in-chief of all five Post weeklies. The Post is the largest Black weekly newspaper in northern California, published in Oakland, California, by the Post News Group, and serving mainly Oakland, Berkeley, Richmond and San Francisco. In late 2004 Bailey became one of the producers, co-founders and hosts for OUR-TV (Opportunities in Urban Renaissance Television) on Comcast Channel 78. Bailey had been known for his aggressive questioning of city officials. Oakland Police spokesman Ronald Holmgren said: "I know him as being a somewhat outspoken type individual, assertive in his journalistic approach when trying to get at matters at hand."

== Murder ==
Bailey had written several articles about the problems of Your Black Muslim Bakery. Saleem Bey, half-brother of Antar and Yusuf IV, had anonymously told Bailey that he believed both Antar and Bey IV had looted the business. By this time, the business was in Chapter 11 bankruptcy and was over one million dollars in debt.

Bailey's article was never published. As Bailey walked to work on the morning of August 2, 2007, a van pulled up and a man jumped out and shot the reporter. According to a witness the man had a "long gun" and ran "full tilt" across the street. Oakland Fire Capt. Melinda Drayton said Bailey had been shot first in the back and then once in the head. Bailey's funeral was held at St. Benedict's Catholic Church in East Oakland.

The killer was later identified as Devaughndre Broussard. He confessed to the murder, but after almost two years of incarceration, he agreed to testify against Bey IV in exchange for a 25-year sentence. He told authorities that Bey IV had a hit list of people "he wanted to get rid of" who had "done stuff to" the bakery and that Chauncey Bailey's name was on the list.

Broussard was booked on suspicion of murder on August 4, 2007, for the killing of Bailey, having told police detectives that he considered himself "a good soldier". Though other charges were made against those arrested, none of them were charged with Bailey's murder. On August 7, 2007, Broussard was arraigned in Alameda County Superior Court, on charges of murder and possession of a firearm by a convicted felon.

Broussard testified for the prosecution at the trial of Bey IV and Antoine Mackey in 2011. He stated in court he was ordered by Bey to find, track and kill Bailey before the journalist could print his latest article on the bakery. Bey IV and Mackey were both convicted of multiple counts of murder and sentenced to life in prison without the possibility of parole.

=== Recognition ===
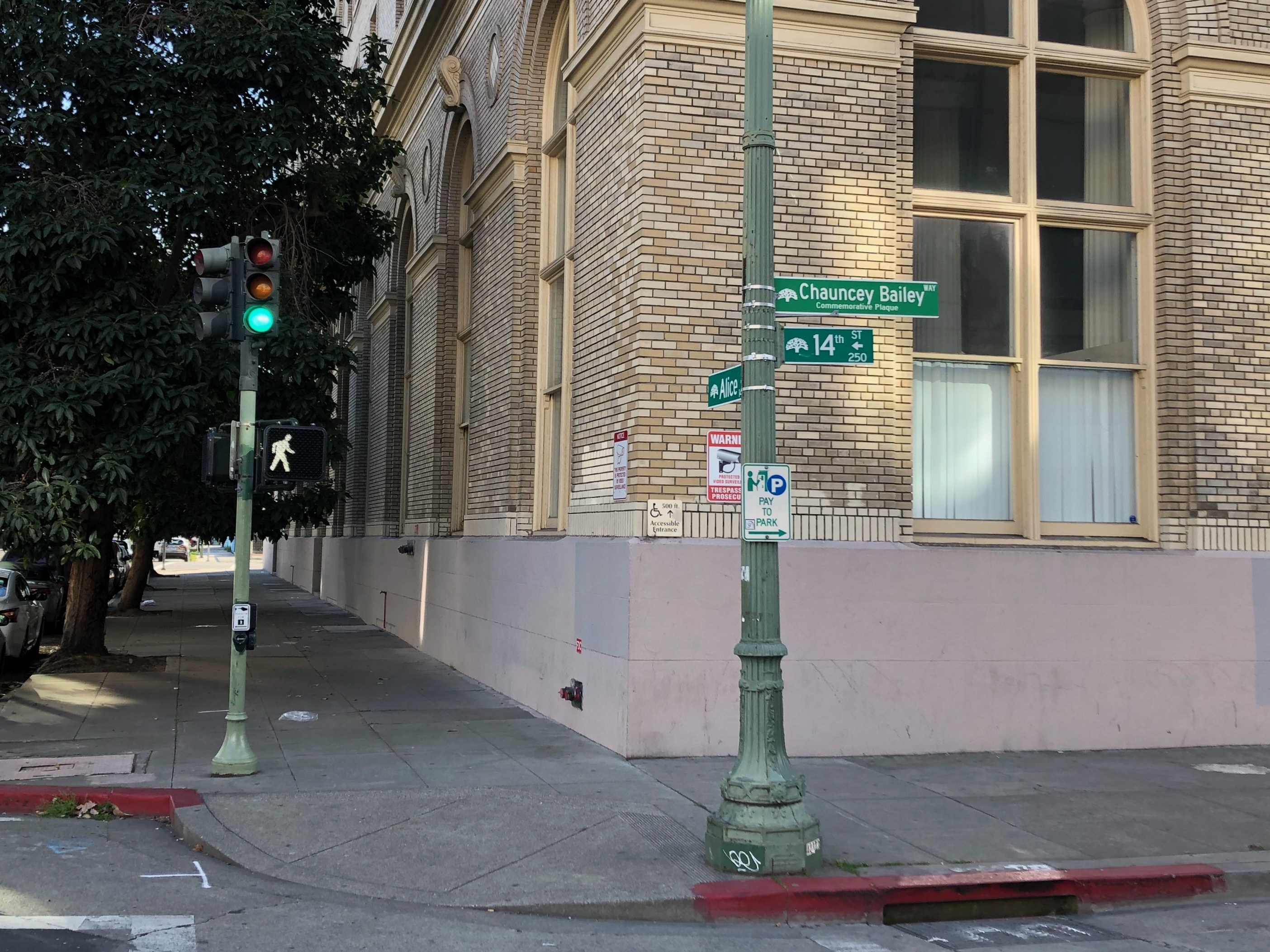
Intersection of Alice St and 14th St, including Chauncey Bailey Way marker

In March 2020, the Oakland City Council voted to publicly memorialize Bailey by renaming a portion of 14th Street between Broadway and Oak Street to "Chauncey Bailey Way", a street where he frequently walked to work before he died there. This street name was presented in a ceremony in March 2022.

== The Chauncey Bailey Project ==
To continue Bailey's work and answer questions regarding his death, more than two dozen reporters, photographers and editors from print, broadcast and electronic media, as well as journalism students, formed a group called the Chauncey Bailey Project. It was convened by New America Media, the Pacific News Service and the Robert C. Maynard Institute for Journalism Education.

In June 2008, the Chauncey Bailey Project released a secretly recorded police video that reveals how Black Muslim Bakery leader Yusuf Bey IV kept the gun used in the Chauncey Bailey killing in his closet after the attack and bragged of playing dumb when investigators asked him about the shooting. Bey goes on to describe Bailey's shooting in detail, then laughingly denies he was there, and boasts that his friendship with the case's lead detective protected him from charges. Bey also claims he knew he was being recorded.

Bay Area activist, investigative journalist, and radio talk show host J.R. Valrey (who works under the pseudonym "Minister of Information JR"), has accused the Chauncey Bailey Project of inaccurate and "self-congratulatory" reporting. Valrey's criticisms largely stem from a 2008 Chauncey Bailey Project article published in the Oakland Tribune entitled "Evidence Ignored", of which Valrey's connections to Chauncey Bailey and Your Black Muslim Bakery was one of the focuses.

In 2010, Thomas Peele, Josh Richman, Mary Fricker and Bob Butler received the McGill Medal for Journalistic Courage from the Grady College of Journalism and Mass Communication for their work on the project.

== See also ==
- List of journalists killed in the United States
- Censorship in the United States
