= Downtown Oakland =

Central business district of Oakland, California

Coordinates: 37.80436°N 122.27114°W

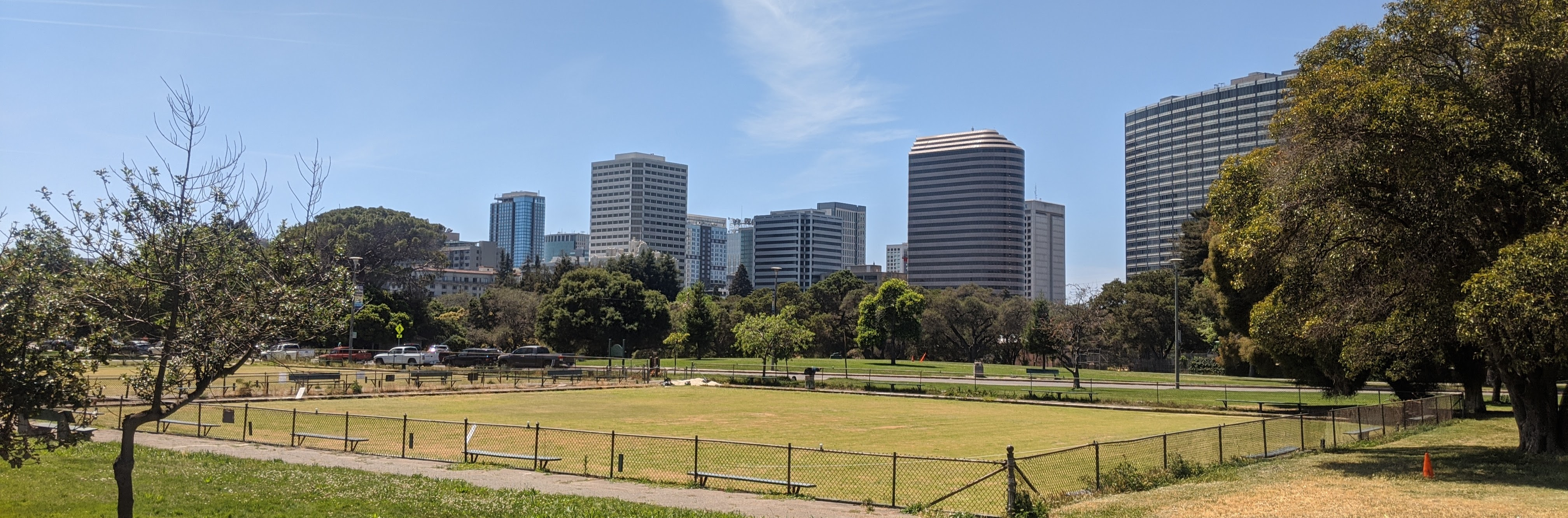
Downtown Oakland from Lake Merritt

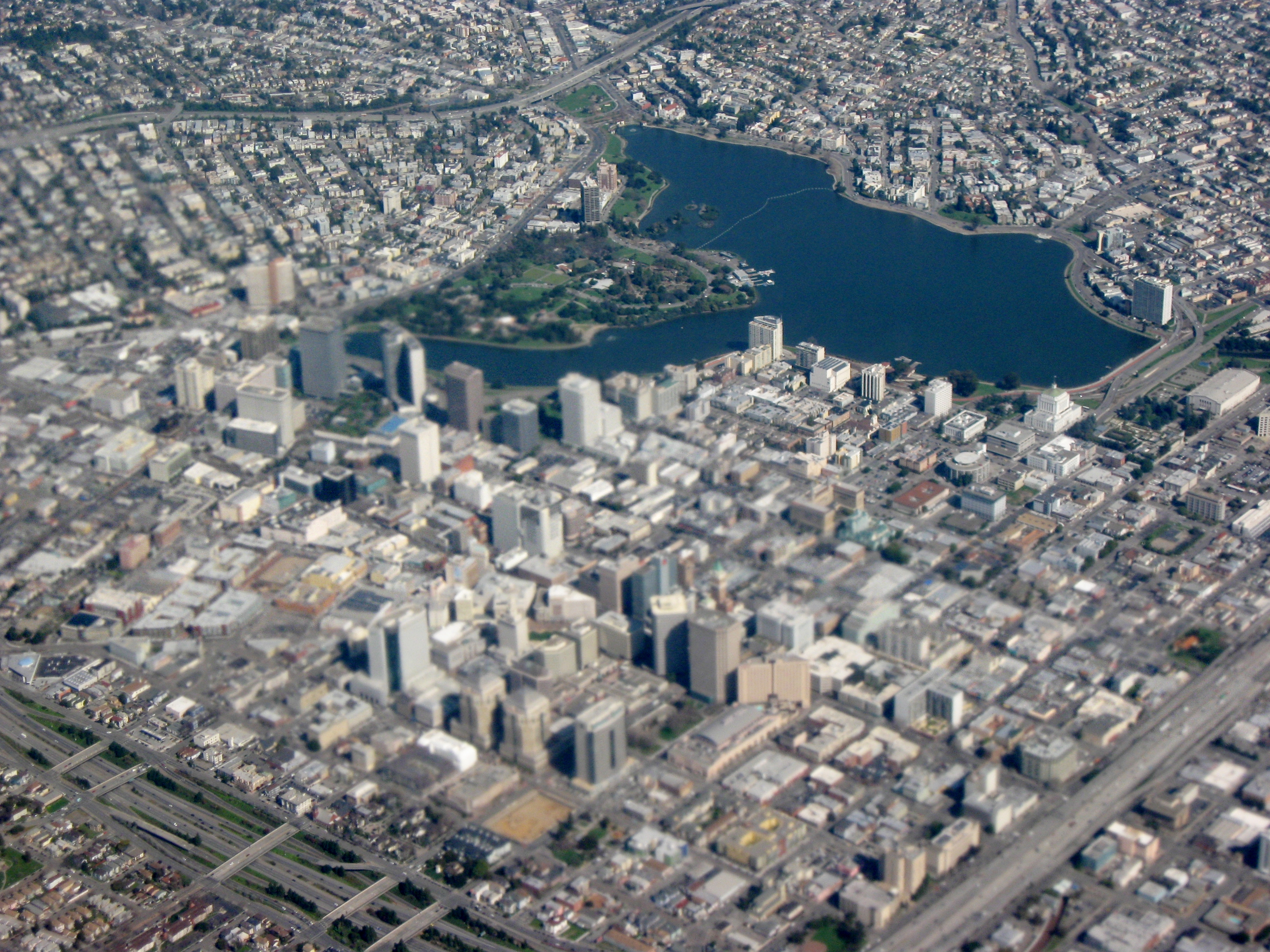
Aerial view of Downtown Oakland and Lake Merritt

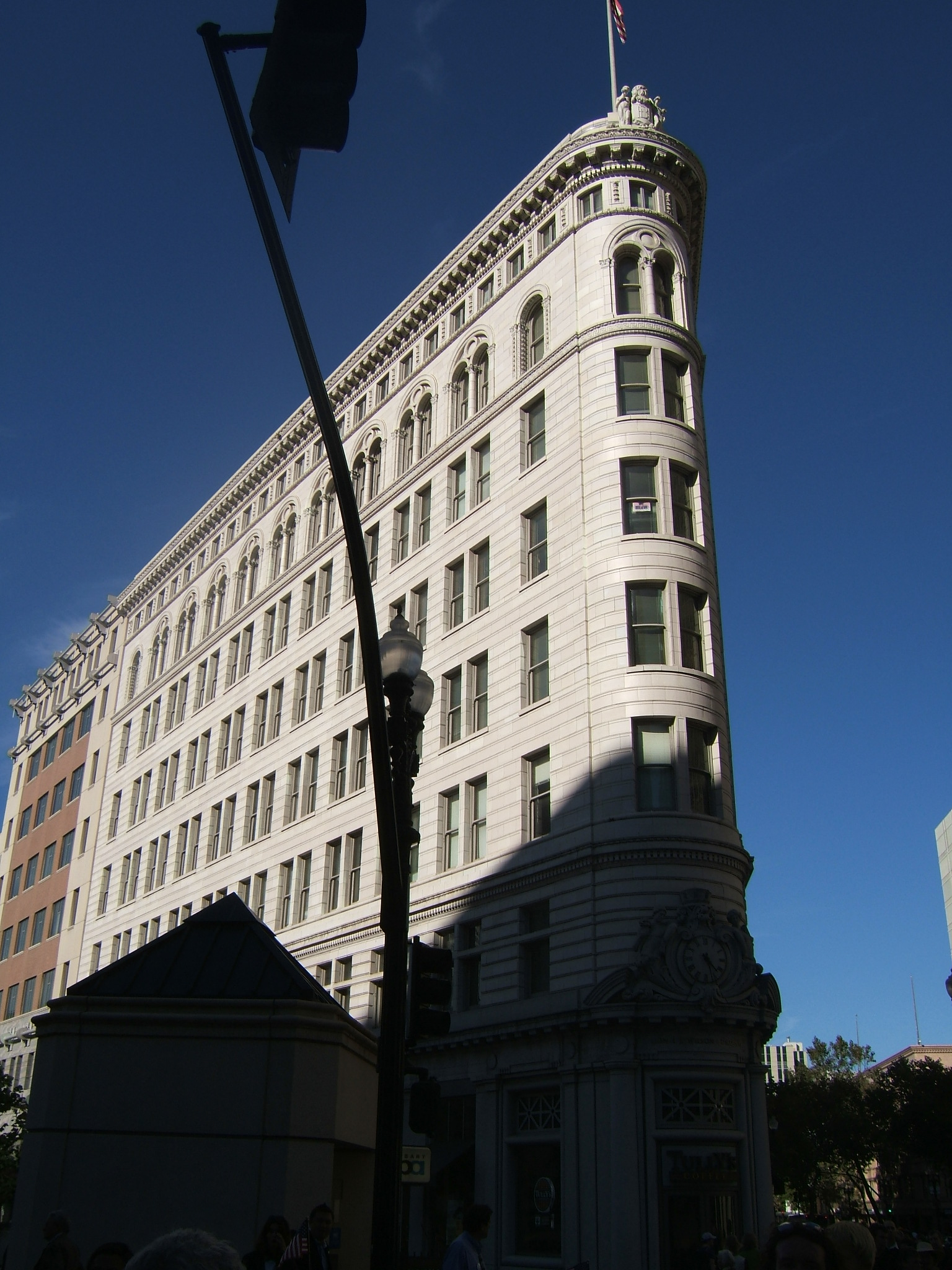
Lionel J. Wilson/Broadway Building at 150 Frank H. Ogawa Plaza

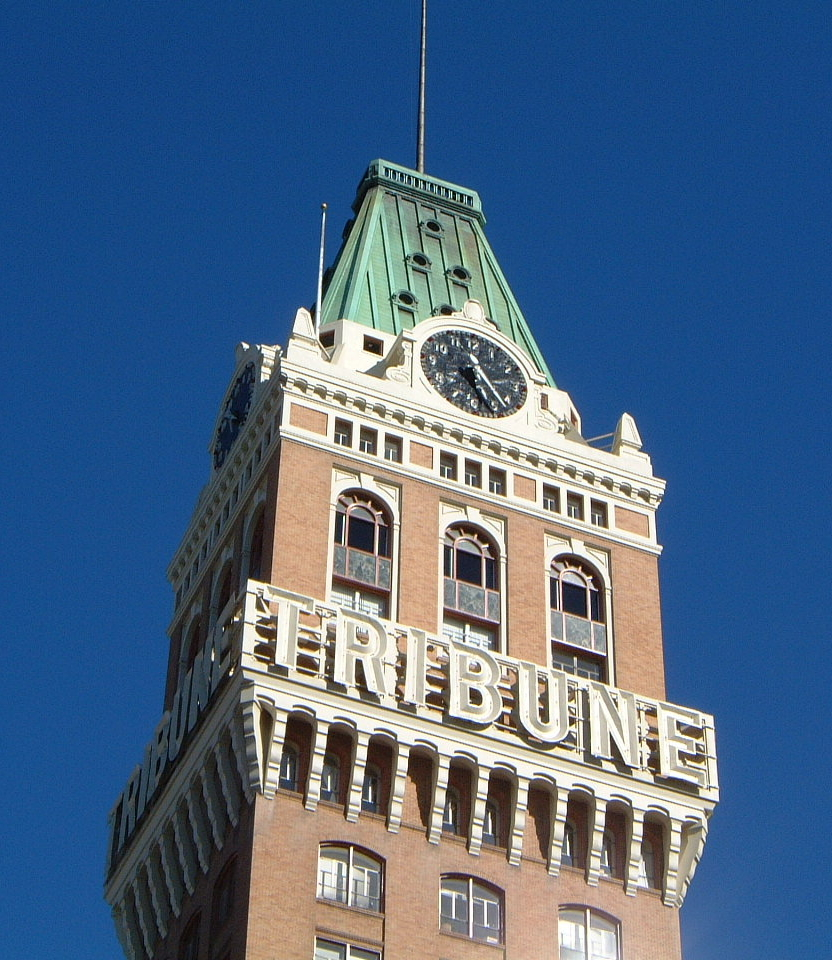
Detail of the Romanesque Revival Tribune Tower. The building serves as a quintessential Oakland landmark, timepiece, and navigation aid, as its unique green roof and massive red neon sign and clock can be seen for miles.

Downtown Oakland is the central business district of Oakland, California, United States. It is located roughly bounded by both the Oakland Estuary and Interstate 880 on the southwest, Interstate 980 on the northwest, Grand Avenue on the northeast, and Lake Merritt on the east.

The Downtown Oakland area is sometimes expanded to refer to the industrial and residential Jack London Square and Jack London warehouse district areas, the Lakeside Apartments District, which are a largely residential neighborhood on the west side of Lake Merritt, the Civic Center district, Chinatown, and the south end of Oakland's Broadway Auto Row, an area along Broadway which has historically been used by car dealers and automobile repair shops. While many consider these areas outside of downtown proper, they are generally considered more geographically proximate to Downtown Oakland than to East Oakland, North Oakland or to West Oakland and are thus sometimes associated with Downtown Oakland. In the 21st century, during and after the COVID-19 pandemic, Downtown Oakland experienced a significant exodus of businesses.

According to Point2Homes.com, using U.S. Census Bureau data, Downtown Oakland has over 5,000 residents.

== Culture ==
=== Black Cowboy Parade ===
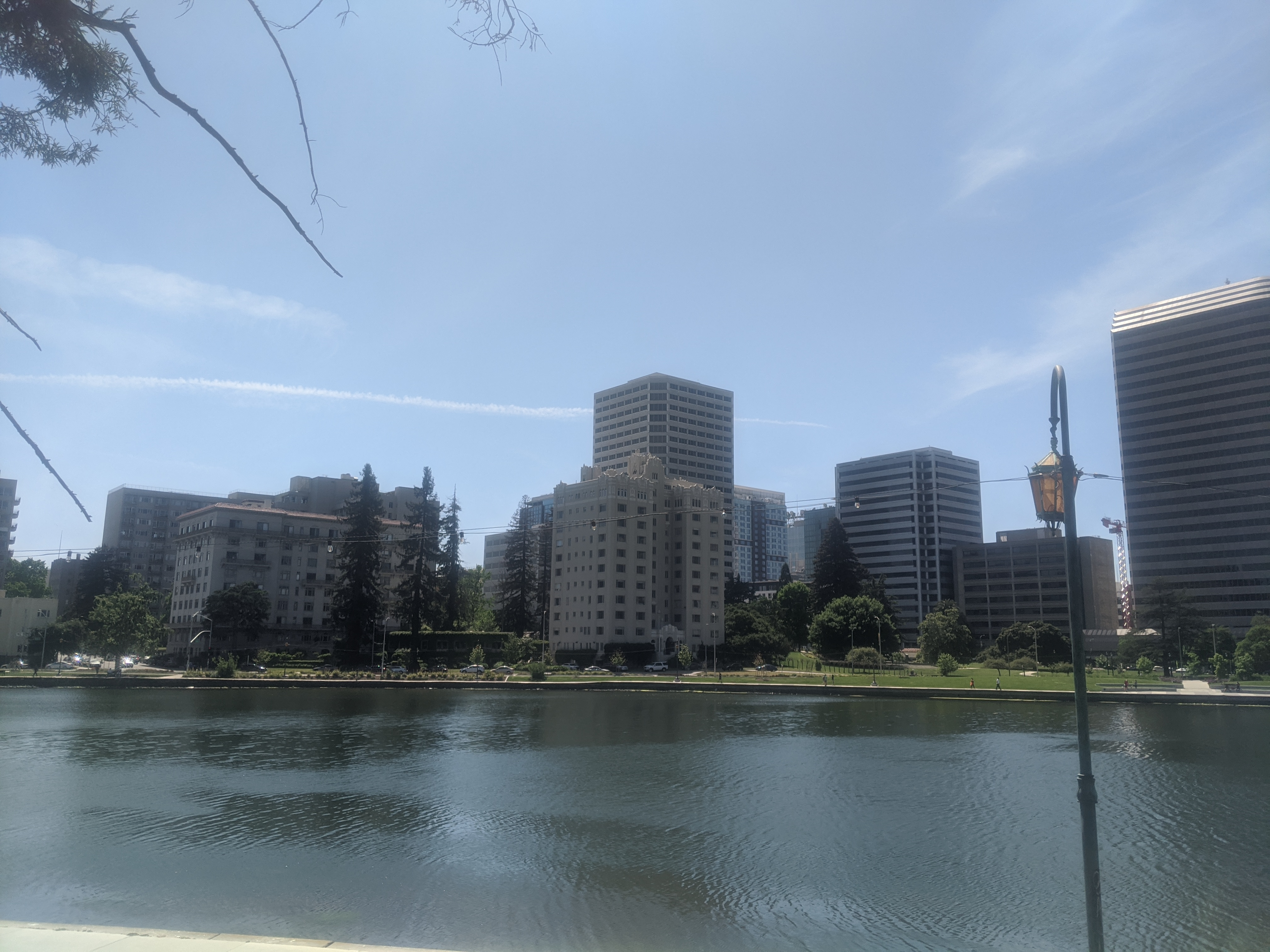
Downtown Oakland view from Lake Merritt

Downtown Oakland hosts the only celebration of its kind in the nation in memory of the black cowboys who helped settle the American West. The annual parade typically begins on an early October weekend at DeFremery Park in West Oakland en route to Frank H. Ogawa Plaza where judging booths are set up. After an awards ceremony, the parade returns to DeFremery Park for a celebration.

In 2026, a portion of Downtown Oakland was officially recognized by the California Arts Council as the Black Arts Movement and Business District after years of advocacy from Black activists, business owners, artists, culture workers, and city officials. The district includes important sites such as Malonga Casquelourd Center for the Arts, the African American Museum and Library, and is home to the annual Black Joy Parade.

== Land use and points of interest ==
Downtown Oakland includes apartment and condominiums, numerous retail businesses, tall modern office buildings, shorter mixed-use historic buildings, and hubs of AC Transit and BART. The city's official Entertainment District includes the historic Paramount and Fox Theatres, nightclubs, restaurants, the headquarters of Clorox, City Center, a portion of Old Oakland, and a portion of Chinatown.

Downtown includes a portion of the oldest part of the city. The area from the Oakland Estuary inland to 14th Street between West Street and the Lake Merritt Channel was the original site of Oakland, and there are several 19th-century houses scattered around the edges of downtown and in Chinatown. The Oakland Museum is located on Oak Street near the southeastern edge of Downtown.

The Black Panther Museum is located downtown, by the Civic Center.

== Education ==
=== Higher education ===
Laney College, with more than 12,000 students, is located on Fallon Street near the Lake Merritt BART station. Other educational institutions include Lincoln University, a small business school catering mainly to international students, and a downtown office of Cal State East Bay. Oaksterdam University, a business college which prepares students for medical cannabis work, is located on 15th Street in an area referred to as "Oaksterdam".

The original campus of UC Berkeley was located between Franklin, Harrison, 12th and 14th streets; and the University of California system is currently headquartered in Downtown.

=== Public primary and secondary education ===
Lincoln Elementary School, one of the few public elementary schools in the downtown of a major US city, is on the edge of downtown, near the center of Chinatown. The Oakland School for the Arts, a charter school, is building a new facility surrounding the Fox Oakland Theatre in Oakland's Uptown Oakland.

== Transportation ==
=== Motor vehicle limitations ===
City Hall Plaza is a city park and a "pedestrian plaza" which includes what was once the terminus of San Pablo Avenue where it met Broadway at 14th Street. It also includes 15th Street, which once ran through what is now "Kahn's Alley", past the 250 Frank H. Ogawa Plaza building, across Clay Street, through what is now a glass windowed lobby of the California State office building, connecting with Jefferson Street on the building's west side entrance. Motor vehicle traffic has also been excluded from where former city streets, Washington street and 13th street, were once aligned through what is now the Oakland City Center development. Today, the area features an outdoor retail mall with pedestrian streets laid out to replicate the original street grid.

=== BART ===
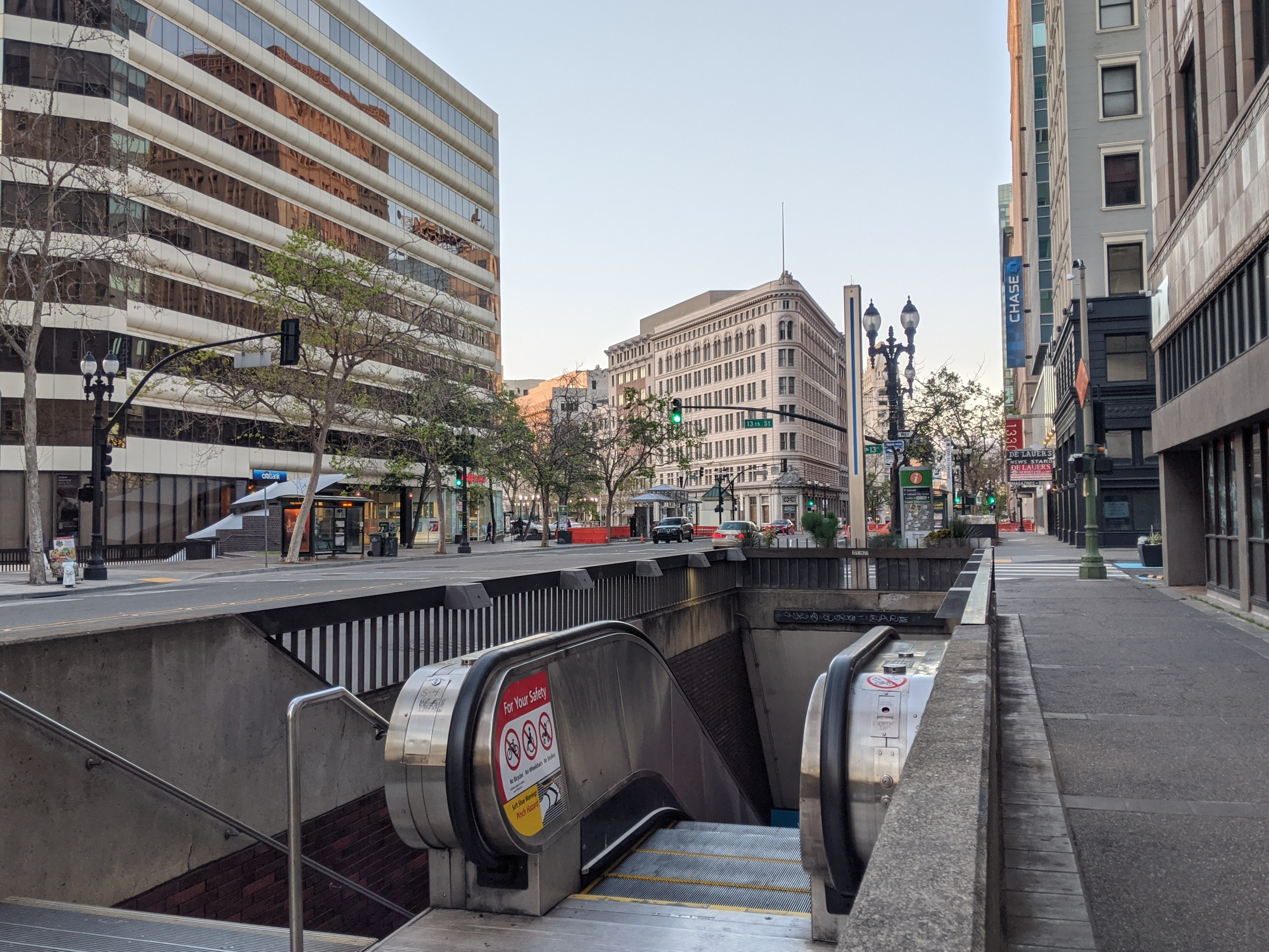
BART's 12th Street Station entrance at 1245 Broadway

Three subway Bay Area Rapid Transit stations serve downtown: 12th Street Oakland City Center station, located at 1245 Broadway, and 19th Street Oakland station, located at 1900 Broadway, are both located on the Broadway subway corridor. The Lake Merritt station is in the eastern area of Chinatown, at 800 Madison Street. All of BART's main services travel through the Oakland Wye, an underground flying wye.

=== AC Transit ===
Several routes operated by AC Transit pass through or end in Downtown Oakland. These include:

Local Routes

- 1T: upgraded bus service featuring partial center dedicated lanes and median stops, from Downtown Oakland (11th + Clay) to San Leandro BART via International Boulevard
- 6: Downtown Oakland (10th + Washington) to Downtown Berkeley (Oxford + Addison) via most of Telegraph Avenue
- 12: Jack London Square Amtrak Station to Berkeley–Westbrae (Gilman + Sixth) via parts of Grand Avenue, Martin Luther King Jr. Way (mostly in Berkeley), and Gilman Street (Berkeley)
- 14: West Oakland BART to Fruitvale BART via 14th Street and parts of East 18th Street, East 21st Street, East 27th Street, School Street, and High Street
- 18: Lake Merritt BART to Albany–UC Village via parts of Martin Luther King Jr. Way, Shattuck Avenue (mostly Berkeley), and Solano Avenue (Berkeley and Albany)
- 19: Downtown Oakland (11th + Jefferson) to Fruitvale BART via Buena Vista Avenue (Alameda)
- 20: Downtown Oakland (11th + Jefferson) to the Dimond District (Fruitvale + MacArthur) via parts of Webster Street (in Alameda), Alameda South Shore Center, Park Street (Alameda), and Fruitvale Avenue
- 29: Emeryville (Christie + 64th) to Trestle Glen (Lakeshore + Walavista) via Hollis Street (mostly Emeryville), Peralta Street, parts of 10th, 11th, and 12th Streets, and Lakeshore Avenue
- 33: Piedmont (Highland Avenue + Highland Way) to Montclair (Moraga + La Salle) via Hampton Road (Piedmont), Oakland Avenue, Harrison Street, and eventually to Park Boulevard
- 40: Downtown Oakland (11th + Jefferson) to Bay Fair BART via parts of Foothill Boulevard, Bancroft Avenue, and East 14th Street (San Leandro)
- 51A: Rockridge BART to Fruitvale BART via Broadway and parts of Webster Street and Santa Clara Avenue (both Alameda)
- 62: West Oakland BART to Fruitvale BART via parts of 7th and 8th Streets, 8th Avenue, and 23rd Avenue, passing in front of Highland Hospital. This bus line is unique in not providing service near 12th Street BART station, instead continuing straight on 7th and 8th Streets through Chinatown and into West Oakland.
- 72 and 72R: Jack London Square (2nd + Clay; no Amtrak service) to Hilltop Mall via parts of San Pablo Avenue. The 72R serves limited stops along the 72 route at higher frequency from Jack London Square to Contra Costa College; 72 line trips also short turn at Contra Costa College when Hilltop Mall is closed. A few 72, 72R, and 72M trips begin and end outside of downtown Oakland, usually at the beginning and end of service hours, or when providing supplementary service to schools in El Cerrito.
- 72M: Jack London Square (2nd + Clay) to Point Richmond (Castro + Tewksbury) via parts of San Pablo Avenue and Macdonald Avenue (Richmond)
- 88: Lake Merritt BART to Downtown Berkeley via parts of 11th and 12th Streets, Market Street, and Sacramento Street (Berkeley)
- 96: Dimond District (Montana + Fruitvale) to Alameda Point (West Midway + Monarch) via 14th Avenue. This line serves both Lake Merritt and 12th Street BART stations before entering the Posey and Webster Street tubes and serving the west of Alameda.

The 314 formerly made two trips per week through downtown Oakland from the West Oakland Post Office to the Walmart Supercenter at Hegenberger Road and Edgewater Drive in East Oakland, via Santa Clara Avenue (Alameda) and Doolittle Drive. Service has been suspended on this line since March 2020 due to the COVID-19 pandemic.

Transbay Routes

- NL: Salesforce Transit Center (San Francisco) to Eastmont Transit Center via parts of West Grand Avenue, 20th Street (Thomas L. Berkley Way), Grand Avenue, and MacArthur Boulevard, serving limited stops
- O: Salesforce Transit Center to Fruitvale BART, mainly via Santa Clara Avenue (Alameda). In the San Francisco direction, buses make one stop at 7th and Alice Streets in Chinatown; towards Fruitvale BART, one stop is made near downtown at 5th and Washington Streets, and another in West Oakland at 5th and Market Streets.
- W: Salesforce Transit Center to Bridgeside Shopping Center (Alameda) via parts of Webster Street and High Street (both only in Alameda). The W serves the same stops in Oakland as the O.

All-Nighter Routes (all routes meet near 20th Street and Broadway)

- 800: the sole late-night Transbay service, from the Salesforce Transit Center to Richmond BART/Amtrak via parts of 7th Street, Telegraph Avenue, University Avenue (Berkeley), San Pablo Avenue (Berkeley, Albany, El Cerrito) and Macdonald Avenue (Richmond), approximating the route of BART service from Richmond
- 802: to Berkeley Amtrak via San Pablo Avenue
- 805: to Oakland San Francisco Bay Airport via parts of Grand Avenue, MacArthur Boulevard, and 73rd Avenue
- 840: to Eastmont Transit Center via parts of Foothill Boulevard
- 851: Downtown Berkeley BART to Fruitvale BART via parts of Bancroft Way and Durant Avenue (Berkeley), College Avenue, Broadway, and Santa Clara Avenue (Alameda)

The 1T continues to run at late nights, replacing a segment of line 801 upon the opening of line 1T in August 2020. Passengers may transfer at San Leandro BART to 801 service via International Boulevard, East 14th Street, and Mission Boulevard, approximating the route of BART service from Fremont.

Transit passengers traveling in and out of downtown are serviced by various AC Transit stops near Broadway and 12th Street, loosely connected to 12th Street BART, as well as the Uptown Transit Center bus mall on 20th Street, connected to 19th Street BART. The Uptown Transit Center features multiple bus shelters with seating, NextBus arrival prediction signs, and local and Rapid Bus service to Oakland's streetcar suburbs. These stations host local service, Rapid service, Transbay Express, and All Nighter service. (Some, but not all, other bus stops in downtown Oakland also include shelters and arrival signs.) A Clipper Add Value Machine is located at AC Transit headquarters at 1600 Franklin Street, as well as at all BART stations.

=== Gondola ===
The Oakland Athletics made a proposal to have a privately financed gondola lift travel on Washington Street from 10th Street near City Center to Water Street in Jack London Square. It is proposed as a new mode of transportation to the team's future ballpark in Jack London Square. There would be approximately 12-14 gondola cabins, each of which would carry about 35 people, with a projection of 6,000 people transported per hour. This project wasestimated to be completed in 2023, but the Athletics decided to go ahead with their move to Las Vegas instead.

== Community Benefit District ==
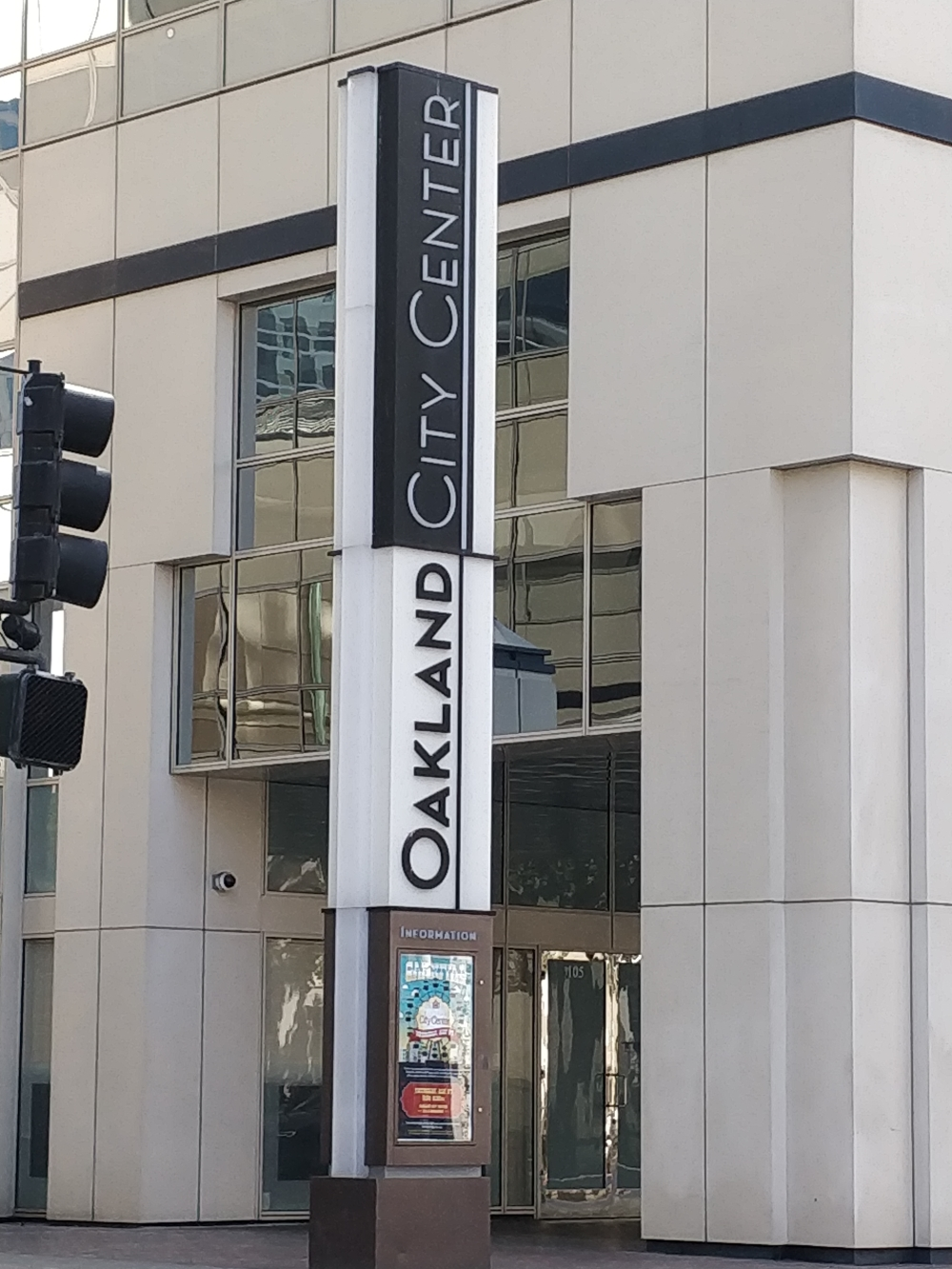
Oakland City Center in 2018

The Downtown Oakland Association (DOA) and Lake Merritt-Uptown District Association (LMUDA) are community benefit districts (CBDs) that were formed in February 2009. Property owners in both Downtown Oakland and the Lake Merritt/Uptown Districts voted by a margin of almost 8 to 1 to support a voluntary property tax to fund services that would improve the quality of life in their respective communities. The associations meet and function jointly. Services funded by these Districts include maintaining cleanliness and order in the public rights of way, improving district identity and advocating on behalf of the area's property owners, business owners and residents. In June 2013, the districts were recognized by the International Downtown Association (IDA) and named the IDA's June Downtown of the Month. On July 24, 2018, DOA and LMUDA were renewed as CBDs for another 10-year term. Oakland Chinatown Improvement Council (OCIC) was established in 2021 and designated a CBD as well.

Previously, the DOA/LMUDA had three organizational committees, the District Identity and Street Improvement (DISI) Committee, the Sidewalk Operations, Beautification & Order (SOBO) Committee and the Joint Organization (ORG) Committee.

The districts have helped fund several neighborhood beautification/improvement projects and initiatives, including The Latham Square pedestrian plaza, back of BART planter boxes, hanging flower baskets and banners, and median landscaping projects.

== Historic districts ==
The Downtown Oakland Historic District was listed on the National Register of Historic Places in 1998. The listing included 43 contributing buildings, one contributing site and one contributing object.

Other historic districts have been designated in Old Oakland: the Lakeside Apartments district, Preservation Park, and the Waterfront Warehouse district.

== Incidents of crime ==
=== Murder of Chauncey Bailey ===
On August 2, 2007, journalist and editor-in-chief of the Oakland Post, Chauncey Bailey was assassinated by Your Black Muslim Bakery handyman Devaughdre Broussard as Bailey was walking to work, around 7:30 am at the southeast corner of 14th and Alice streets; across from Lakeside Apartments District.

=== Lake Merritt Juneteenth shooting ===
A small group of protestors rallied outside of Oakland City Hall calling for Thao to address a Juneteenth 2024 celebration mass shooting at Lake Merritt that wounded 15 people, and the FBI raid at her home. JaJuan Kelly was arrested in connection with the shooting, and was paroled two years later. The group supported the recall election and demanded Thao's resignation.

=== 2026 bar shooting ===
On March 7, 2026, two people (a male, aged 25, and a female, 33) were killed and five others were injured in a shooting that occurred at a bar on the 400 block of 14th Street, at 3:30 a.m. The following afternoon, it was reported by local news sources that at least one person was detained in connection with the shooting. A video shows a man shooting at patrons while curled up on the floor in a fetal position.

== See also ==
- 10k Plan
- African American Museum and Library at Oakland
- Black Bloc
- Cathedral of Christ the Light
- Oakland Chinatown
- Jack London Square
- Jack London Warehouse District
- Lake Merritt
- List of tallest buildings in Oakland
- Oaksterdam
- Oakland City Center
- Old Oakland
- Ordway Building
- Tribune Tower
- Uptown Oakland
