= Oakland Post (California) =

African-American weekly newspaper

- Type: Weekly newspaper
- Format: Broadsheet
- Owner: Post News Group
- Publisher: Paul Cobb
- Founded: 1963
- Headquarters: Oakland, California
- Website: postnewsgroup.com

The Oakland Post is the largest African-American weekly newspaper in Northern California, headquartered in Downtown Oakland. It is one of five local newspapers published by the Post News Group, along with the Berkeley Tri-City Post, the Richmond Post, the San Francisco Post and the South County Post. At its height, the paper circulated 55,000 copies a week.

== History ==
The Oakland Post founded in 1963 by Thomas L. Berkley and his spouse, Velda M. Berkley as the first paper of the Post News Group. Headquartered in downtown Oakland The weekly serves the San Francisco Bay Area communities of Oakland, Berkeley, Richmond and San Francisco.

After Thomas Berkley's death in 2001, his widow, Velda Berkley became the sole owner of the paper. In December 2004, Berkley sold the Oakland Post to Paul Cobb, the former director of the Oakland Citizen's Committee for Urban Renewal (OCCUR). Before acquiring the paper, Paul Cobb had worked as a reporter for the Oakland Post for 39 years. Thomas Berkley's daughter, Gail Berkley, is still an executive editor of the Oakland Post. The paper continues to publish news and advertising, circulating 25,000 copies a week.

E. F. Joseph served as a photojournalist for the paper.

== Murder of Chauncey Bailey ==
In June 2007, prominent African-American journalist Chauncey Bailey had been promoted to editor-in-chief of all five Post newspapers. On the morning of August 2, 2007, Bailey was killed by a gunman at close range, as he was walking to work, around 7:30 am at the southeast corner of 14th and Alice streets; across from Oakland's Lakeside Apartments District. Oakland Police described the murder as an assassination. Witnesses said a single gunman wearing dark clothing and a ski mask approached Bailey, shot twice and ran to a waiting get-away van. Three men were later sentenced to prison for the crime.
