= Elihu Harris =

American politician (born 1947)

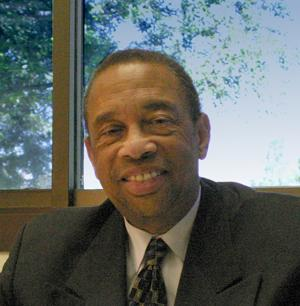
- Harris, circa 2012

Chancellor of the Peralta Community College District
- In office December 2, 2004 – December 6, 2010
- Preceded by: Ronald J. Temple
- Succeeded by: Wise E. Allen

46th Mayor of Oakland
- In office January 3, 1991 – January 4, 1999
- Preceded by: Lionel Wilson
- Succeeded by: Jerry Brown

Member of the California Assembly from the 13th district
- In office December 4, 1978 – December 3, 1990
- Preceded by: John J. Miller
- Succeeded by: Barbara Lee

Personal details
- Born: Elihu Mason Harris; August 15, 1947 (age 79) Los Angeles, California, U.S.
- Party: Democratic
- Spouse: Shelia Wells-Harris
- Education: California State University, Hayward (BA); University of California, Berkeley (MPP); UC Davis School of Law (JD)

Elihu Mason Harris (born August 15, 1947) is a retired American politician and college administrator. A member of the Democratic Party, Harris served as the 46th Mayor of Oakland, California from 1991 to 1999; he previously served for 12 years (1978–1990) as a member of the California State Assembly. He was the Chancellor of Peralta Community College District from 2004 to 2010.

== Early life ==
Born in Los Angeles, Harris moved to Berkeley, California during childhood and graduated from Berkeley High School in 1965.

Harris earned a B.A. in political science from California State University, Hayward, where he served as student body vice-president. Harris received a Master of Public Policy from University of California, Berkeley in 1969 and a J.D. degree from University of California, Davis School of Law in 1972. He is a member of Kappa Alpha Psi.

== Career ==
Harris as mayor, in 1998

Harris was the Mayor of Oakland from 1991 until 1999. He has also served as a California Uniform Law Commissioner since 1981.

From 1992 to 1997, Harris co-owned Oakland, California radio station KDIA along with former California Assembly Speaker Willie Brown. Harris also co-owned Fresno radio station KFIG with Mark A. Lindquist until it was sold in 2005 and disbanded on Jan 16, 2008.

Harris was the first major party politician to lose a state legislative race to a Green Party candidate. He ran in a 1999 special election in hopes of regaining the California State Assembly seat he previously held from 1978 to 1990, but lost to Green challenger Audie Bock. In the 1999 election, Harris, an African-American, sent targeted mailers to households in selected precincts, mostly African American, urging voters to vote for him and receive a fried chicken meal if they presented a voting stub at selected supermarkets. There was voter backlash because of the perception of vote buying and had a subtext of racism. In his losing effort, Harris outspent Bock better than 16 to 1 ($550,000 to $33,000).

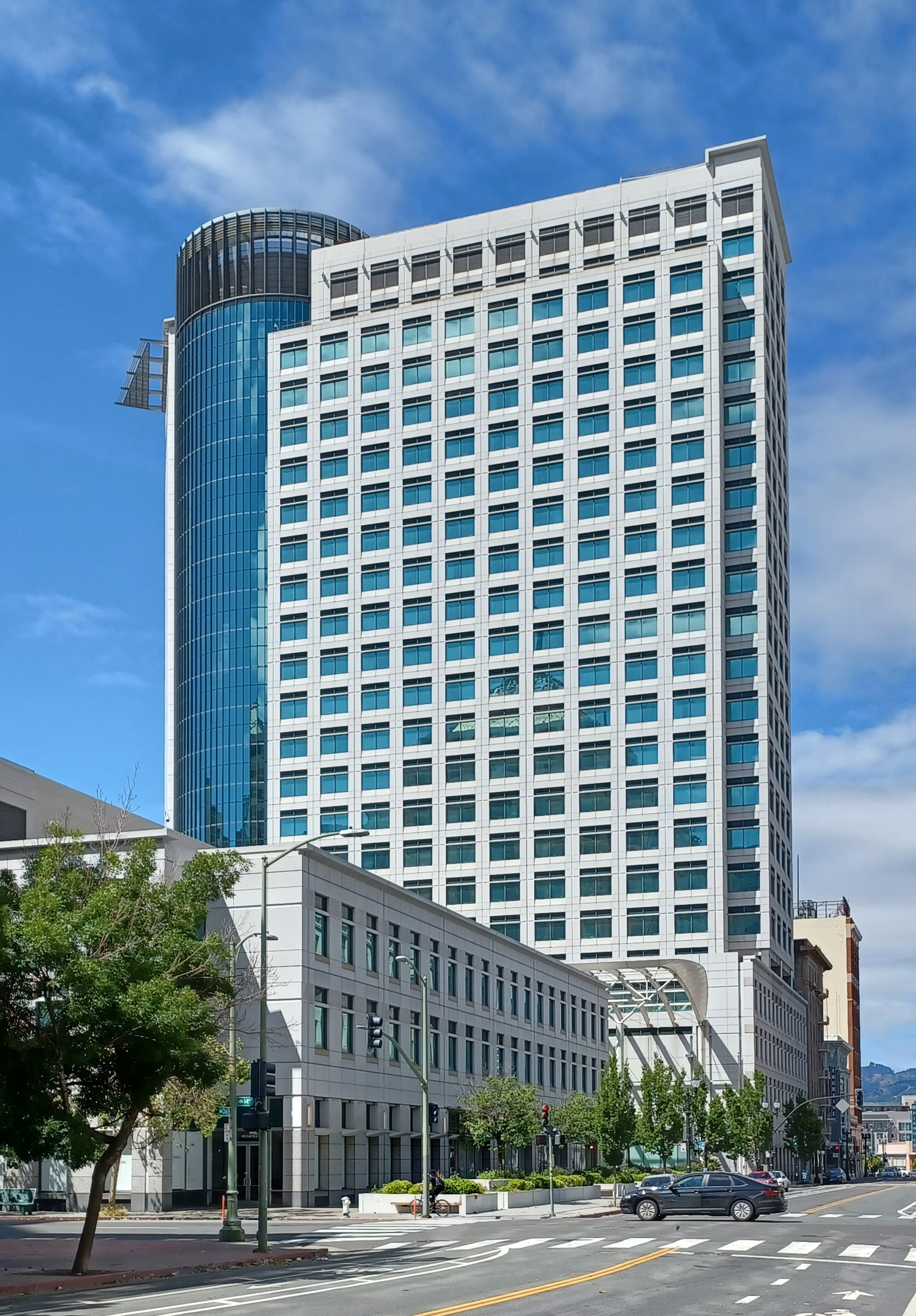
The Elihu M. Harris State Office Building is named after Harris.

His legacy in Oakland includes the naming of the Elihu M. Harris State Office Building after him, which was built in downtown Oakland near the pre-existing Federal Building and City Hall. The three proximate structures form a large triangle of massive government buildings in a larger business redevelopment area.

From 2003 to 2010, Harris was Chancellor of Peralta Community College District. He had been interim chancellor from 2003 until receiving the post on a permanent basis. Following news coverage that raised questions about Harris' leadership, his contract was not renewed by the Board of Trustees when it expired on June 30, 2010.

Harris and his wife also run a Berkeley funeral home that his parents once owned, according to county records listing him as its owner.

== FBI investigation ==
In March 2011, Harris was investigated by the FBI in relation to a no-bid contract awarded to his business partner, Mark A. Lindquist of 1701 Associates, Inc, for $948,796 back when Harris was still Chancellor of Peralta and Lindquist was still President of the district's foundation, serving as a boardmember on its Board of Trustees. There were complaints about Lindquist's work and Harris did not disclose his business relationship with Lindquist until after the contract was awarded. Harris also declared his Piedmont partnership with Lindquist and three other partners in 2008 after Lindquist won the contract. But Harris and Lindquist signed real estate documents in August 2007 when the business bought a Piedmont property from Pacific Gas and Electric Company. Records show the deal had been negotiated for more than a year.

== See also ==
- 1994 Oakland mayoral election

Political offices
Preceded by John J. Miller	Member of the California State Assembly from the 13th district December 4, 1978 – December 3, 1990	Succeeded by Barbara Lee
Preceded by Lionel Wilson	Mayor of Oakland; January 7, 1991 – January 4, 1999	Succeeded by Jerry Brown
