= Lists of journalists =

This is a list of lists of journalists.

- List of investigative journalists

== By country ==
- List of American print journalists
- List of Argentine journalists
- List of Armenian journalists
- List of Brazilian journalists
- List of Bulgarian journalists
- List of Canadian journalists
- List of English journalists
- List of Eritrean journalists
- List of newsreaders and journalists in France
- List of German journalists
- List of Haitian journalists
- List of Hong Kong journalists
- List of Indian journalists
- List of Italian journalists
- List of Malawian journalists
- List of Pakistani journalists
- List of Slovenian journalists
- List of South African journalists
- List of Sri Lankan journalists
- List of Swedish journalists
- List of Uruguayan journalists

== Other by country ==
- List of journalists killed during the War in Afghanistan (2001–14)
- List of journalists killed in Bangladesh
- List of journalists killed in Europe
- List of journalists killed in Guatemala
- List of journalists killed in Honduras
- List of journalists killed in India
- List of journalists killed in Assam (India)
- List of victims of the Sicilian Mafia (Italy)
- List of journalists and media workers killed in Mexico
- List of journalists killed during the Balochistan conflict (1947–present) (Pakistan)
- List of journalists killed under the Arroyo administration (Philippines)
- List of journalists killed in Russia
- List of journalists killed during the Somali civil war
- List of journalists killed in South Sudan
- List of journalists killed during the Mahdist War (Sudan)
- List of journalists killed during the Syrian civil war
- List of journalists killed in Tajikistan
- List of arrested journalists in Turkey
- List of journalists killed in Turkey
- Timeline of reporters killed in Ukraine
- List of journalists killed in Ukraine
- List of journalists killed in the United States
- List of journalists killed in Yemen
- List of journalists killed in the Philippines
- List of journalists killed in Pakistan
- List of journalists killed and missing in the Vietnam War
- List of journalists killed during the Israeli–Palestinian conflict
  - List of journalists killed in the Gaza war
- List of journalists killed during the War in Afghanistan (2001–2021)
- Violence against Palestinian journalists
- Assassination of Vietnamese-American journalists in the United States
- Attacks on journalists during the Israel–Hezbollah conflict (2023–present)

== See also ==
- Journalism
- Glossary of journalism
- International Day to End Impunity for Crimes Against Journalists
- List of imprisoned, detained and missing journalists
- List of journalists killed in 2017
- Journalist
- Maguindanao massacre
- Assassinations of Little Haiti journalists
