= Bocharov =

Bocharov and Bocharova (Russian: Бочаро́в, Бочаро́ва) are respectively male and female Slavic occupational surnames derived from Bochar (бочар) which means cooper.

== Males with the name ==
- Alexander Bocharov (born 1975), Russian professional road bicycle racer
- Andrey Bocharov (born 1969), Russian politician
- Anton Bocharov (born 1995), Russian footballer
- Dmitry Bocharov (chess player) (born 1982), Russian chess grandmaster
- Mélovin, (Kostyantyn Bocharov, born 1997), Ukrainian singer
- Mikhail Bocharov (1872–1936), Russian opera singer
- Nikita Bocharov (born 1992), Russian footballer
- Petko Bocharov (1919–2016), Bulgarian journalist and translator
- Stanislav Bocharov (born 1991), Russian ice hockey player

== Females with the name ==
- Aleksandra Bocharova (born 1943), Russian rower
- Maria Bocharova (born 2002), Russian beach volleyball player
- Nina Bocharova (1924–2020), Soviet/Ukrainian gymnast
- Tatyana Bocharova (born 1974), Kazakhstani triple jumper

== See also ==
- Bocharov Ruchey, the summer residence of the President of Russia
