= Areh =

Areh may refer to:

- Valentin Areh (b. 1971), Slovenian journalist
- Areh, Iran, a village in Kerman Province, Iran
- Areh, Syria, a village in as-Suwayda Governorate, Syria
