= WGMA =

WGMA may refer to:

- WGMA (AM), a radio station (1490 AM) licensed to serve Hazleton, Pennsylvania, United States
- WCYZ, a radio station (99.7 FM) licensed to serve Ocala, Florida, United States, which held the call sign WGMA from 2013 to 2022
- WLQY, a radio station (1320 AM) licensed to serve Hollywood, Florida, which held the call sign WGMA from the mid-1960s to 1980
