= List of Bulgarian journalists =

A list of notable Bulgarian journalists:

- Maxim Behar
- Oggy Boytchev
- Velizar Enchev
- Deyan Enev
- Valentin Fortunov
- Ivo Indzhev
- Nadezhda Kehayova
- Nikolay Kolev
- Doncho Papazov
- Gerri Peev
- Plamen Petrov
- Petko Bocharov
- Volen Siderov
- Stefan Tafrov
- Milen Tsvetkov
- Ralitsa Vassileva
- Elena Yoncheva
