= Commission on Human Rights in South Sudan =

UN commission of inquiry

The Commission on Human Rights in South Sudan is a United Nations commission of inquiry established by the United Nations Human Rights Council. Established through Resolution 31/20 on 23 March 2016, the Commission is mandated to monitor and investigate human rights violations in South Sudan. Its mandate is renewed on yearly basis upon the decision by the 47 member states of the Human Rights Council.

== Structure ==
The Commission is headed by three Commissioners, appointed by the United Nations Human Rights Council. Currently, the members of the Commission are Ms. Yasmin Sooka (chairperson, from South Africa), Mr. Barney Afako (from Uganda), Mr. Carlos Castresana Fernandes (from Spain). The Commissioners are supported by a secretariat based in Juba, South Sudan.

== Reporting ==
The Commission publishes annual inquiry reports (also called Mandate Reports) detailing the overall human rights situation in South Sudan and also publishes thematic reports known as Conference Room Papers (CRPs). These reports primarily focus on severe violations of International Human Rights Law and International Humanitarian Law, with a great emphasis on conflict-related sexual violence. The Commission's secretariat staff and the three Commissioners conduct fact-finding missions across South Sudan and neighboring countries to interview victims and witnesses. These investigative findings form the foundation of the Commission's reports. The Commission's reports are utilized by international communities, including governments and NGOs, to strengthen their advocacy efforts and inform policy/response formation decisions.

Some of the recent reports released by the Commission are as below:

- March 2024 Report: details the overall human rights situation in South Sudan and flags that the likelihood of more violation is high unless the government take urgent and dedicated actions to address the conflict drivers
- October 2023 Report (CRP): details the plight of civic and political space in South Sudan. It tells how systematic tools are employed to repress, restrain and control civil society organizations and media
- April 2023 Report (CRP): released on 3 April, talks in great details about the conflicts that happened during 2022 in South Sudan and portrays how impunity is fueling violence in the country. It documented the violations that were committed in the context of these conflicts and names individuals responsible for the same
- March 2023 Report: details the overall human rights situation in South Sudan with findings of the Commission's investigations during 2022 and tells how impunity drives all conflicts and violations in the country.

== See also ==
- South Sudanese Civil War
- Ethnic violence in South Sudan
- Human rights in South Sudan
- List of journalists killed in South Sudan
