= Assassinations of Little Haiti journalists =

1993 murders in Miami, Florida

The Little Haiti neighborhood is located in Miami, Florida, and it is where the three journalists were assassinated.

Three pro-democracy Haitian radio journalists were assassinated in Little Haiti, Miami, Florida, United States between 1991 and 1993.

The assassinations took place during a period when Haiti was undergoing a turbulent transition to democracy, and those political tensions were manifested in the Little Haiti neighborhood by the deadly attacks on radio journalists. The attacks caught attention of the Haitian community. There was further interest in whether the murders were ordered by the Haitian military regime as that could possibly change the status of refugees from economic to political asylum seekers. In addition to the journalists, radio host Ringo Cayard owned a building that was bombed after D'Or's murder, and Daniel Buron, a bus driver who supported democracy, was assassinated on 9 March 1994 in Little Haiti. The FBI was brought in once it was determined that the motive was political.

The three journalists belong to the group of eleven race and ethnic community journalists to be killed in the United States since 1977.

== Political context ==
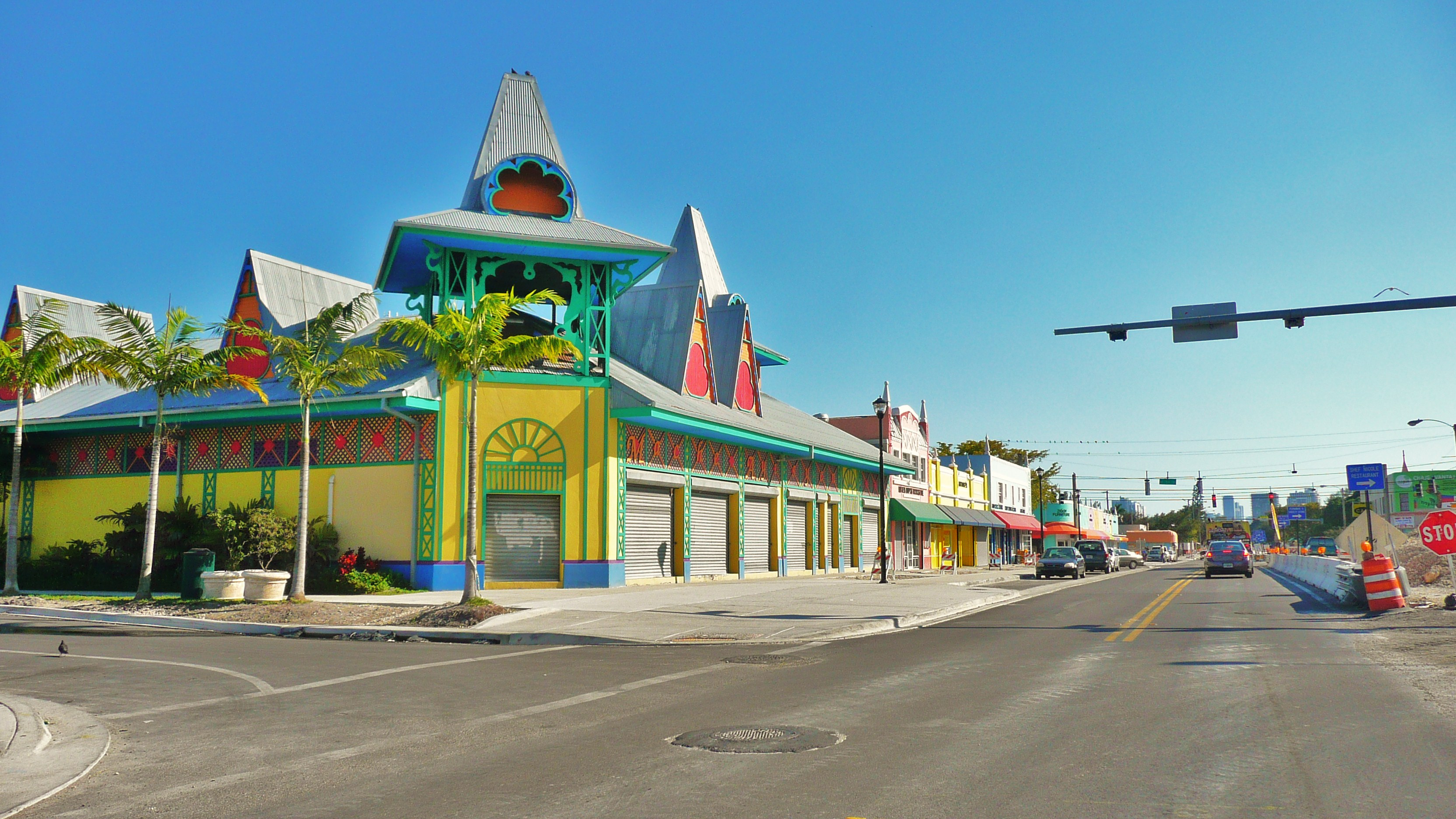
Little Haiti south side commercial center.

Jean-Bertrand Aristide became Haiti's first democratically elected president on 7 February 1991 after a long history of dictatorships and a new Constitution. Even before the inauguration of Aristide, there was a failed coup in January 1991. However, Aristide was in office less than a year before he was ousted in a military coup on 30 September 1991. Although President Aristide had a short-lived presidential term, he created hope among Haitians that their conditions would improve and managed to introduce some human rights reforms. The military coup that overthrew the government of President Aristide was under the leadership of Lt. General Raoul Cédras, who had been selected by President Aristide to serve as commander-in-chief of the armed forces. The United States pushed those governing in Haiti to reinstate Aristide and honor the democratic vote. A multilateral effort led to the diplomatic agreement known as the Governors Island Agreement, which was signed to achieve the return of Aristide on 3 July 1993. If successful, the process return of President Aristide by 30 October 1993. However, Cédras defaulted on the agreement. This led to a United Nations' mandate in July 1994 to use force, if necessary, to restore the democratically elected president. With an imminent US invasion planned for September 1994, Cédras left Haiti, which led to the return of President Aristide.

== Jean-Claude Olivier ==
Jean Claude Olivier, also known as Division Star, (ca. 1944 – 18 February 1991) was a Haitian-born music promoter and radio host of the program "Radyo Pep-la" (Translated: Radio of the People), for WLQY-AM (1320) broadcasting in French Creole, and he was the first to be assassinated just 11 days after President Aristide took office.

While Olivier was involved with music entertainment, he shared D'Or's or St. Plite's interest in politics and engaged his audience with political talk. Similarly, he was supportive of Aristide, belonged to the political organization Veye Yo, and called for boycotts of businesses in the Little Haiti that were not supportive of Aristide or democracy. He received a threat before his assassination as did D'Or.

On the evening of 18 February, a band Olivier represented had finished playing at the Chateau Club and Olivier was leaving the nightclub. His assassin approached him and when he was close enough to Olivier, he shot the journalist three times, before making his getaway in a waiting car with a driver. The team that assassinated Olivier and the others were Haitian-Bahamian and were hired to kill from a list of names.

While WLQY is a station that serves the Miami-area, its signal carries to Haiti and has an audience there.

== Fritz D'Or ==
Fritz D'Or
- Born: ca. 1953; Haiti
- Died: March 15, 1991 (Age 38); Little Haiti neighborhood, Miami, Florida, United States
- Cause of death: Gun shot
- Occupations: Radio journalist and talk show host; Paralegal
- Employer: WLQY-AM (1320)

The murder of Fritz D'Or, or Fritz Dor, (ca. 1953 – 15 March 1991), was the second in a string of political attacks by supporters of the former Haitian military regime who were opposed to Aristide. D'Or was a US Haitian journalist and radio talk show host for WLQY-AM (1320). He was assassinated by Billy Alexander in Miami, Florida, for voicing his support for the new Haitian democracy and President Aristide.

Political activists described Fritz D'Or as "the heart of the community" in Little Haiti. D'Or had four children and took care of his paralyzed brother. D'Or was an active member of Haitian-American political organization, known as Veye Yo. Aside from his political radio commentary, D'Or was both on the board of directors and worked as a paralegal at the Haitian Refugee Center, in addition to his involvement in multiple community education programs. He worked at WLQY-AM (1320) as a pro-democratic and pro-Aristide Creole-language commentator and political reporter.

After receiving several threats, Fritz D'Or was fatally shot four times and killed by Billy Alexander for US$2,000 at 8:55 p.m. on Friday, 15 March 1991. At the time he was standing outside his office close to the intersection of Northeast Second Avenue and 59th Street in Little Haiti, in Miami, Florida. Police later found a death list with D'Or's name on it, as well as two other prominent Haitian journalists. Billy Alexander, a Haitian American, was convicted of killing D'Or.

== Dona St. Plite ==
Dona St. Plite
- Born: Donaldson St. Plite ca. 1952; Haiti
- Died: October 24, 1993 (Age 41); Miami, Florida
- Cause of death: Gun fire
- Citizenship: Haitian & U.S.
- Occupations: Radio journalist, host, and commentator
- Employer(s): WKAT (radio), Miami
- Known for: His support of Haitian President Jean-Bertrand Aristide

Dona St. Plite, (1952 – 24 October 1993), was a Haitian-born radio journalist, host, and commentator who worked for the radio station WKAT, in Miami, Florida, which served the emigrant Haitian community. St. Plite was the third Haitian-born journalist assassinated in Miami in three years for supporting ousted Haitian president Jean-Bertrand Aristide.

St. Plite was the host of two radio programs: Tet Ensemble on WKAT and "Tet Ensemble Extra" (Translated: Heads Together) on WLQY-AM. As a commentator, St. Plite primarily covered human rights and politics. His radio shows featured guests, call-ins, and French and Creole music. He was normally on the air between midnight to 6 a.m. The manager of the station, Arnie Premer, said St. Plite owned a driving school and was planning to open a used car dealership.

Dona St. Plite was shot numerous times in the chest outside Miami Edison Middle School located in the Little Haiti neighborhood of Miami on October 24, 1993, as he was leaving a fundraiser for the family of Fritz Dor, a Haitian-born radio personality who was killed in 1991. Dona St. Plite's name appeared on a hit list of supporters of ousted Haitian president Jean-Bertrand Aristide. Although the list's origin is unknown, it contains an introduction of flattering Haiti's military government and announcing those on the list should be killed in order to keep Haitian president Jean-Bertrand Aristide from returning to Haiti. A radio commentator, Nelson Voltaire, premiered on a show with St. Plite a few hours before the shooting. They deliberated the ongoing political chaos in Haiti, including the United Nations' determination to force the military to give up power and allow Aristide to return to office by October 30, 1991.

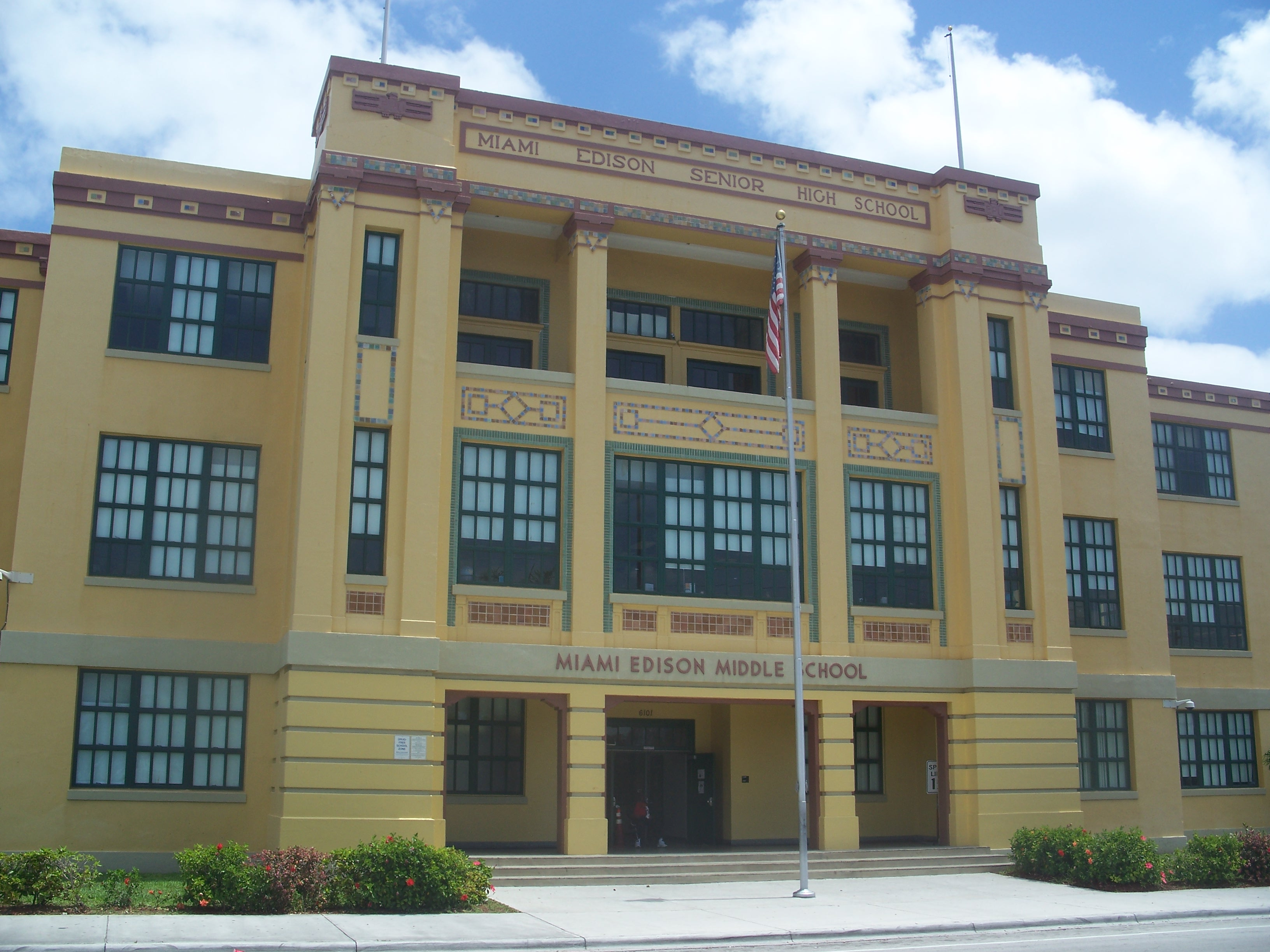
St. Plite was assassinated outside near Miami Edison Senior High School.

== Trial ==
Well before anyone was arrested or tried for Olivier's or D'Or's murder, rumors were rampant in the Little Haiti community about who possible suspects might be. Former interim Haitian leader Prosper Avril, who at the time lived in Miami, gives his own account of being the target of such rumors in his book An Appeal to History: The Truth about a Singular Lawsuit. After law enforcement officials completed their lengthy investigation, those who were charged lacked the political connections rumored. Instead they were hired hit men.

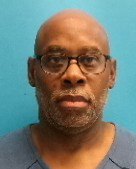
Billy Alexander Mugshot

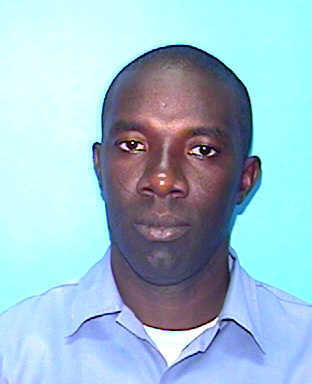
Glossy Bruce Joseph (release in 2005)

It was alleged that Billy Alexander, born 29 November 1969 , was contracted to kill D'Or for his opposition to Louis Thermitus, a local record store owner, who D'Or had accused of being a member of the Tonton Macoute and of supporting the regime that had ousted Haiti's elected President Aristide. At the time of his arraignment and later his conviction for the murder of D'Or and Jean-Claude Olivier, another radio journalist, Alexander was serving a life sentence for killing Alcee Lissitte during an unrelated robbery in Fort Lauderdale in 1991. The look out man for the contract killing Glossy Bruce Joseph was arrested in May 1991 and later convicted and sentenced to 25 years in 1993. Hitler Fleurinord was charged with conspiracy to commit murder and accused of being the alleged driver. Thermitus was never implicated or charged in the murders. Moses Durosier was suspected of being in the car the night Olivier was killed. The authorities said Durosier agreed to wear a listening device while deliberating with Fleurinord about the crimes. The authorities also said Fleurinord said he and Alexander were paid $5,000 for one slaying and $2,000 for the other during the conversation.

== Impact ==
The murders of Haitian journalists raised awareness about the dangers faced by ethnic journalists in the United States. Fritz D'Or is one of eleven ethnic journalists to be killed in the United States since 1977, which includes Chauncey Bailey. By the time that D'Or was killed, there had already been eight journalists murdered since 1982, making ethnic journalism one of the field's most hazardous jobs. Most of those murders remained unsolved. While there have been more since St. Plite's murder, the media has deepened its scrutiny into the matter. Haïti Observateur, a Brooklyn-based Haitian weekly, was harassed as a result of the paper's anti-Aristide position. In Haiti, Observateur journalists began to receive vague threats from anonymous callers. The staff was so frightened by the threats that the business manager began delivering the papers himself. After the murders of Jean Claude Olivier and Fritz D'Or, Creole-language talk hosts, heard as far north as Palm Beach County, feared they were victims of terrorism aimed at silencing support of democracy in Haiti.

== Reactions ==
One thousand people marched through the streets of Little Haiti to protest that no arrests had been made in the murder of Olivier and D'Or and within one week the alleged lookout man was arrested. Ron Ilhardt, the homicide detective in charge of the investigation of Jean Claude Olivier and Fritz D'Or, said, "These men were killed for words they spoke over the airwaves".

== See also ==
- List of journalists killed in the United States
