= List of journalists killed in the United States =

Numerous journalists have been murdered or killed in the United States while reporting, covering a military conflict, or because of their status as a journalist. At least 39 of these have been directly targeted as a result of their journalistic investigations.

The most dangerous sector of the US media after 1980 has been the race and ethnic press. According to the Committee to Protect Journalists, ten journalists serving the Vietnamese, Haitian and Chinese immigrant communities were killed in political assassinations between 1980 and 1993. Chauncey Bailey, who was the editor at a large circulation African American newspaper, was murdered in 2007 for his investigative reporting.

Since the September 11 attacks, terrorism-related deaths involving journalists is another trend.

In some cases, journalists have been attacked but survived, such as Victor Riesel.

In addition, journalists may be killed as a result of electronic newsgathering, with 16 journalists dying from news helicopter crashes since 2000. The below list does not include those individuals.

== List ==
Date	Name	Employer	Location	Notes
November 7, 1837	Elijah Parish Lovejoy	Alton Observer	Alton, Illinois	This abolitionist editor was killed by a pro-slavery mob.
June 6, 1843	James Hagan	Vicksburg Sentinel	Vicksburg, Mississippi	Hagan was killed in a duel by Daniel Weisiger Adams-the son of a man he had criticized in his newspaper.
February 29, 1844	James A. Ryan	Vicksburg Sentinel	Vicksburg, Mississippi	The Vicksburg Sentinel was a Democratic paper and Ryan was killed by his rival Whig counterpart in a duel on their second fight.
September 15, 1848	John Jenkins	Vicksburg Sentinel	Vicksburg, Mississippi	Killed in a fight with an attorney after the two had a previous altercation.
June 22, 1854	Joseph Mansfield	San Joaquin Republican	Stockton, California	Mansfield was killed in a fight with a rival editor, both of whom were Democrats.
May 20, 1856	James King of William	Daily Evening Bulletin	San Francisco, California	Killed by a rival journalist.
April 6, 1862	Irving W. Carson	New-York Tribune	Pittsburg Landing, Tennessee	First journalist to be killed during the U.S. Civil War. Killed by a cannonball fire while covering the Battle of Shiloh and General Ulysses S. Grant.
June 23, 1863	Lynde Walter Buckingham	New York Herald	Aldie, Virginia	Killed as a result of an ambush during the U.S. Civil War. He was buried at the Mount Zion Old School Baptist Church-VDHR 53-339 in Aldie.
October 6, 1863	James R. O'Neill	Frank Leslie's Illustrated Newspaper	Baxter Springs, Kansas	O'Neill was an artist-correspondent murdered by Quantrill's guerrillas at the Baxter Springs Massacre.
May 6, 1864	Samuel Wheelock Fiske (aka Dunn Browne)	Springfield Republican	Fredericksburg, Virginia	Capt. Fiske wrote under the name Dunn Browne and served in the army and was mortally wounded at the Battle of the Wilderness.
September 14, 1866	Ridgeway Glover	Frank Leslie's Illustrated Newspaper	Fort Phil Kearny, Wyoming	While covering the American Indian Wars, Glover was killed and mutilated during the construction of Fort Kearny in 1866.
November 5, 1871	Frederick Wadsworth Loring	Appleton's Journal	Wickenburg, Arizona	Was killed while on assignment out west in what is known as the Wickenburg Massacre, an attack on a stagecoach by Native Americans.
November 14, 1874	J. M. Cleet		New Orleans, Louisiana	Journalist killed during the fighting at the Battle of Liberty Place in New Orleans.
June 25, 1876	Mark Kellogg	Associated Press	Little Bighorn Battlefield, Montana	The first Associated Press journalist to die while reporting. Killed in the Battle of the Little Bighorn.
March 27, 1877	J. Clarke Swayze	Topeka Daily Blade	Topeka, Kansas	Swayze was killed after publishing a critical article about his murderer.
April 23, 1880	Charles de Young	The Daily Dramatic Chronicle	San Francisco, California	With his brother M. H. de Young, he founded the newspaper that would become the San Francisco Chronicle. The mayor's son killed him in revenge for a feud de Young had with his father.
November 17, 1881	A. B. Thornton	Boonville News	Boonville, Missouri	The town marshal killed Thornton because of criticism from the newspaper and won acquittal based on the perception that the criticism was too intense.
March 27, 1884	Charles L. Kusz	The Gringo and Greaser	Manzano, New Mexico	Shot through his window by unknown gunman on horses. His newspaper was reform oriented and created enemies as it sought changes.
May 5, 1887	Roderick D. Gambrell	The Shield and Sword	Jackson, Mississippi	Shot by Colonel Jones S. Hamilton for publishing allegations of corrupt business practices Hamilton was engaged in with the state of Mississippi. Hamilton was shot by Gambrell, but survived and was later acquitted of his murder by a jury.
May 1, 1888	John H. Martin	New Mississippian	Jackson, Mississippi	Shot in a street encounter with ex-Confederate General Wirt Adams, who was also shot and killed by Martin. Martin published numerous attacks on Adams's character in part due to his association with Colonel Hamilton, killer of the aforementioned Roderick D. Gambrell. Wirt Adams was the brother of Daniel Weisiger Adams who 45 years before had killed a Vicksburg newspaper editor in a duel.
February 1, 1891	Ignacio Martínez	El Mundo	Laredo, Texas	Owned a newspaper that wrote critical articles on the regime of Mexican President Porfirio Díaz. His murderers fled to Mexico and were never arrested.
February 23, 1891	Albert C. Osborne	Sunday World	Columbus, Ohio	Killed in a shootout with William J. Elliott, a rival editor of the Sunday Capital, and Elliott's brother, Patrick. A bystander was also killed and a number of others wounded. Elliott was convicted of second-degree murder and sentenced to life imprisonment at Ohio Penitentiary.
April 1, 1898	William Cowper Brann	Iconoclast	Waco, Texas	Wrote critical articles about Baptists. Shot in the back during a duel.
January 15, 1903	Narciso Gener Gonzales	The State	Columbia, South Carolina	He was killed by James H. Tillman, the Lieutenant Governor of South Carolina, who was acquitted of murder by a jury.
November 9, 1908	Edward W. Carmack	Nashville American	Nashville, Tennessee	Former congressman and senator. He was killed by a former army officer who disapproved of his name appearing in an article and threatened the editor.
December 25, 1915	Huang Yuanyong	Shao Nian Zhong Guo Weekly	San Francisco, California	The Chinese national was murdered while visiting the United States. The case remained unsolved but Kuomintang (KMT) supporters were suspected of carrying out the assassination at the Shanghai Low restaurant.
July 16, 1926	Don Mellett	Canton Daily News	Canton, Ohio	Shot to death in his garage as a result of a conspiracy with a crime boss and the police chief of Canton.
June 9, 1930	Jake Lingle	Chicago Tribune	Chicago, Illinois	Killed in gangland style by associates of Al Capone. In addition to his job as a reporter, Lingle was on the payroll of Capone's criminal organization.
July 23, 1930	Jerry Buckley	WMBC-AM	Detroit, Michigan	Gunned down on election night.
September 6, 1934	Howard A. Guilford	The Saturday Press	Minneapolis, Minnesota	Editor of a newspaper that exposed rampant corruption and organized crime in Minnesota involving Jewish mobsters such as Kid Cann and prominent local and state politicians, including Governor Floyd B. Olson. He and partner Jay Near won the US Supreme Court decision in Near v. Minnesota.
December 9, 1935	Walter Liggett	Midwest American	Minneapolis, Minnesota	He wrote about political corruption and organized crime, exposing links between Minneapolis Jewish mob leader Kid Cann and Minnesota Governor Floyd B. Olson. He is believed to have been killed on the orders of Cann, possibly with the knowledge or consent of Olson.
January 11, 1943	Carlo Tresca	Il Martello (The Hammer)	New York City, New York	Radical socialist newspaper editor and labor activist; believed to have been killed by a Mafia hitman.
January 22, 1945	Arthur Kasherman	Public Press (alternative)	Minneapolis, Minnesota	His death at E. 15th St & Chicago Ave S near North Central University figured into Hubert Humphrey's mayoral victory.
July 29, 1949	W.H. "Bill" Mason	KBKI (AM)	Alice, Texas	Known as a crusading radio journalist in a county ruled with an iron hand by local law enforcement, Mason was shot dead by Sheriff deputy Sam Smithwick, who Mason had publicly accused of running a strip club. The senate candidate who lost to Lyndon B. Johnson believed that Smithwick had information about how the election had been rigged but Smithwick was hanged before their meeting. Mason's tombstone reads: "He had the nerve to tell the truth for a lot of little people."
September 30, 1962	Paul Guihard	Agence France-Presse	Oxford, Mississippi	Guihard was a British-French civilian who was killed during the civil rights era at the University of Mississippi. He was assigned to photograph the events surrounding James Meredith's attendance when he turned his focus on riots and in the confusion was shot. His murder remains an unsolved case.
August 29, 1970	Rubén Salazar	Los Angeles Times	Los Angeles, California	Salazar was killed by deputies of the Los Angeles County Sheriff's Department while covering the Chicano Moratorium protest in East Los Angeles. The park where the protest took place was later renamed Salazar Park in his honor.
June 2, 1976	Don Bolles	Arizona Republic	Phoenix, Arizona	Murdered by a car bomb. Initially assumed to have been a mafia hit, three local men were later convicted of his death. The motive was determined to have been feared exposure of involvement in a land fraud scheme.
March 9, 1977	Maurice Williams	WHUR-FM	Washington, D.C.	He was murdered during the 1977 Hanafi Siege.
June 28, 1978	John A. Kelly	WNAC-TV	Boston, Massachusetts	Killed during the Blackfriars Massacre.
July 21, 1981	Duong Trong Lam	Cai Dinh Lang (The Village Temple)	San Francisco, California	Killed by gunfire from a member of one of two anti-communist groups that claimed responsibility for his assassination.
August 24, 1982	Nguyen Dam Phong	Tu Do (Freedom)	Houston, Texas	Was assassinated at his home by an anti-communist group.
June 19, 1984	Alan Berg	KOA (AM)	Denver, Colorado	A Jewish radio show host with liberal views who was murdered by a white nationalist group.
October 15, 1984	Henry Liu (a.k.a. Chiang Nan)	Freelancer and author	Daly City, California	A critic of the Kuomintang who was assassinated on the orders of the Kuomintang.
August 9, 1987	Tap Van Pham (a.k.a. Hoai Diep Tu)	Mai	Garden Grove, California	He was assassinated by arson while sleeping in his office by an anti-communist group that took responsibility.
November 22, 1989	Nhan Trong Do	Van Nghe Tien Phong	Fairfax County, Virginia	A layout designer who worked with Triet Le, he was the first employer of the Vietnamese-language magazine to be assassinated.
September 22, 1990	Triet Le	Van Nghe Tien Phong	Bailey's Crossroads, Virginia	A columnist of controversial content for the same Vietnamese magazine that employed Nhan Trong Do. Assassinated.
February 18, 1991	Jean-Claude Olivier	WLQY	Little Haiti, Miami, Florida	A colleague of Fritz d'Or, he was known for his controversial commentary and was assassinated on his way to his car.
March 15, 1991	Fritz d'Or	WLQY	Little Haiti, Miami, Florida	A colleague of Jean-Claude Olivier's at WLQY, he was assassinated as he left a club.
March 11, 1992	Manuel de Dios Unanue	El Diario La Prensa	Queens, New York City, New York	Murdered by Colombian drug traffickers for writing about drug trade.
October 24, 1993	Dona St. Plite	WKAT	Little Haiti, Miami, Florida	St. Plite was attending a benefit for former colleague Fritz d'Or when he was also assassinated for supporting Jean-Bertrand Aristide.
August 19, 1997	Dennis Joos	Colebrook News and Sentinel	Colebrook, New Hampshire	Joos, the editor of the News and Sentinel, was at work when 62-year-old Carl Drega entered the building and shot a local judge (whose office was located in the same building as the News and Sentinel). Joos attempted to disarm Drega but was fatally shot. Drega, who had earlier killed two state troopers in a parking lot, then fled to Bloomfield, Vermont, where he wounded four more troopers in a shootout before being killed by police.
October 18, 2000	James Edwin Richards	Citizen journalist, editor and publisher	Venice, Los Angeles, California	Richards was murdered at his Oakwood neighborhood home in the neighborhood where he had established himself as a citizen crime reporter.
September 11, 2001	Bill Biggart	Freelance photographer	Lower Manhattan, New York City, New York	Killed while photographing the rescue effort outside the World Trade Center before the North Tower collapsed.
September 11, 2001	Glen Pettit	News 12 Long Island	Lower Manhattan, New York City, New York	Petit, who worked for the New York City Police Department video production unit and as a photojournalist for News 12 Networks, was last seen in the South Tower of the World Trade Center with his camera before its collapse.
October 5, 2001	Robert Stevens	Sun	Boca Raton, Florida	Murdered as one of the media targets of the 2001 anthrax attacks less than a month after 9/11.
August 2, 2007	Chauncey Bailey	The Oakland Post	Oakland, California	After investigating corruption and criminal activities connected to Your Black Muslim Bakery, Bailey was murdered on his way to work by an associate of the bakery.
August 26, 2015	Alison Parker	WDBJ 7	Moneta, Virginia	Parker, a reporter, and Ward, a photojournalist, were shot on live television by one-time colleague Vester Flanagan while interviewing a subject about tourism.
August 26, 2015	Adam Ward	WDBJ 7	Moneta, Virginia	Parker, a reporter, and Ward, a photojournalist, were shot on live television by one-time colleague Vester Flanagan while interviewing a subject about tourism.
May 30, 2018	Zachary “ZackTV” Stoner	Citizen journalist	Chicago, Illinois	Stoner, a music journalist who ran a YouTube channel covering the Chicago hip-hop scene and life in his community, was shot and killed in an SUV while leaving a concert. In 2022, The Associated Press obtained records showing that police had arrested five suspects, but had to release them when the DA's office declined to prosecute, citing insufficient evidence.
June 28, 2018	Gerald Fischman	The Capital	Annapolis, Maryland	Five employees (four journalists and a sales associate) of The Capital were murdered during the Capital Gazette shooting in the newspaper's office. The suspect in the shooting, Jarrod Ramos, had held a grudge against the newspaper since it published a story about his guilty plea in a criminal harassment case in 2011. Hiaasen was an editor and columnist, Fischman was an editorial columnist, Winters was a features journalist. McNamara was a sports reporter for the Capital and the editor for the affiliated weekly Bowie Blade-News. Also killed in the shooting was Rebecca Smith, a sales associate for Capital Gazette Communications.
June 28, 2018	Rob Hiaasen	The Capital	Annapolis, Maryland	
June 28, 2018	John McNamara	The Capital	Annapolis, Maryland	
June 28, 2018	Wendi Anne Winters	The Capital	Annapolis, Maryland	
September 3, 2022	Jeff German	Las Vegas Review-Journal	Las Vegas, Nevada	German, an investigative journalist, was stabbed multiple times outside his home. On September 7, Clark County public administrator Robert Telles was arrested as the suspect in German's murder. German had written an investigative series about alleged mismanagement in Telles' office, and Telles had lost a primary election for his position that June.
February 22, 2023	Dylan Lyons	Spectrum News 13	Pine Hills, Florida	Lyons, a television news reporter for Spectrum News 13, was shot and killed while filming a story on a homicide that happened earlier that day. His colleague, photographer Jesse Walden, was injured but survived. The police arrested the suspect in the original homicide, who is expected to face murder charges for allegedly committing the first homicide, the shooting of the journalists, and a later shooting in which a woman was injured and her nine-year-old daughter was killed.

== Other journalists and media workers killed on 9/11 ==
The only professional, working journalist to die while covering the September 11 terrorist attacks on the World Trade Center in New York City was photojournalist Bill Biggart, who was killed by falling debris as he was taking photographs. However, the International Federation of Journalists, which also counts media workers, said that six other media workers and a journalist who were not working at the time died in the attacks. Among those media workers listed as killed were six broadcast TV engineers, who worked inside a tower, and another professional photojournalist, who was a passenger on the first plane that was flown into the WTC.

- Gerard J. "Rod" Coppola, TV engineer for WNET-TV, WTC (North Tower)
- Donald Joseph DiFranco, TV engineer for WABC-TV, WTC (North Tower)
- Steven A. Jacobson, TV engineer for WPIX-TV, WTC (North Tower)
- Robert Edward “Bob” Pattison, TV engineer for WCBS-TV, WTC (North Tower)
- Thomas Nicholas Pecorelli, professional freelance photojournalist, American Airlines Flight 11 passenger
- Isias Rivera, TV engineer for WCBS-TV, WTC (North Tower)
- William V. "Bill" Steckman, TV engineer for WNBC-TV, WTC (North Tower)

== Gallery ==
Journalists killed in the United States
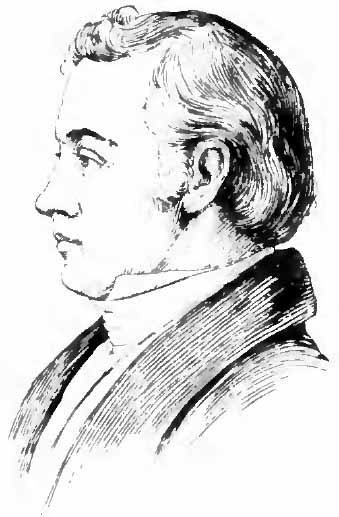
Elijah Parish Lovejoy

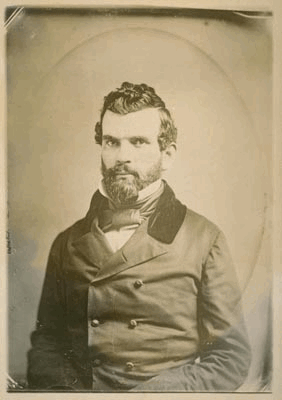
James King of William

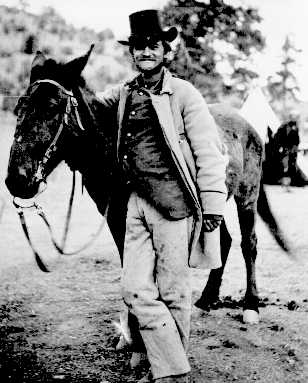
Frederick Wadsworth Loring

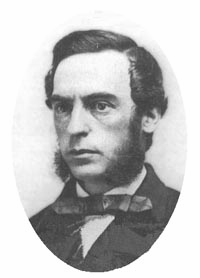
Mark Kellogg

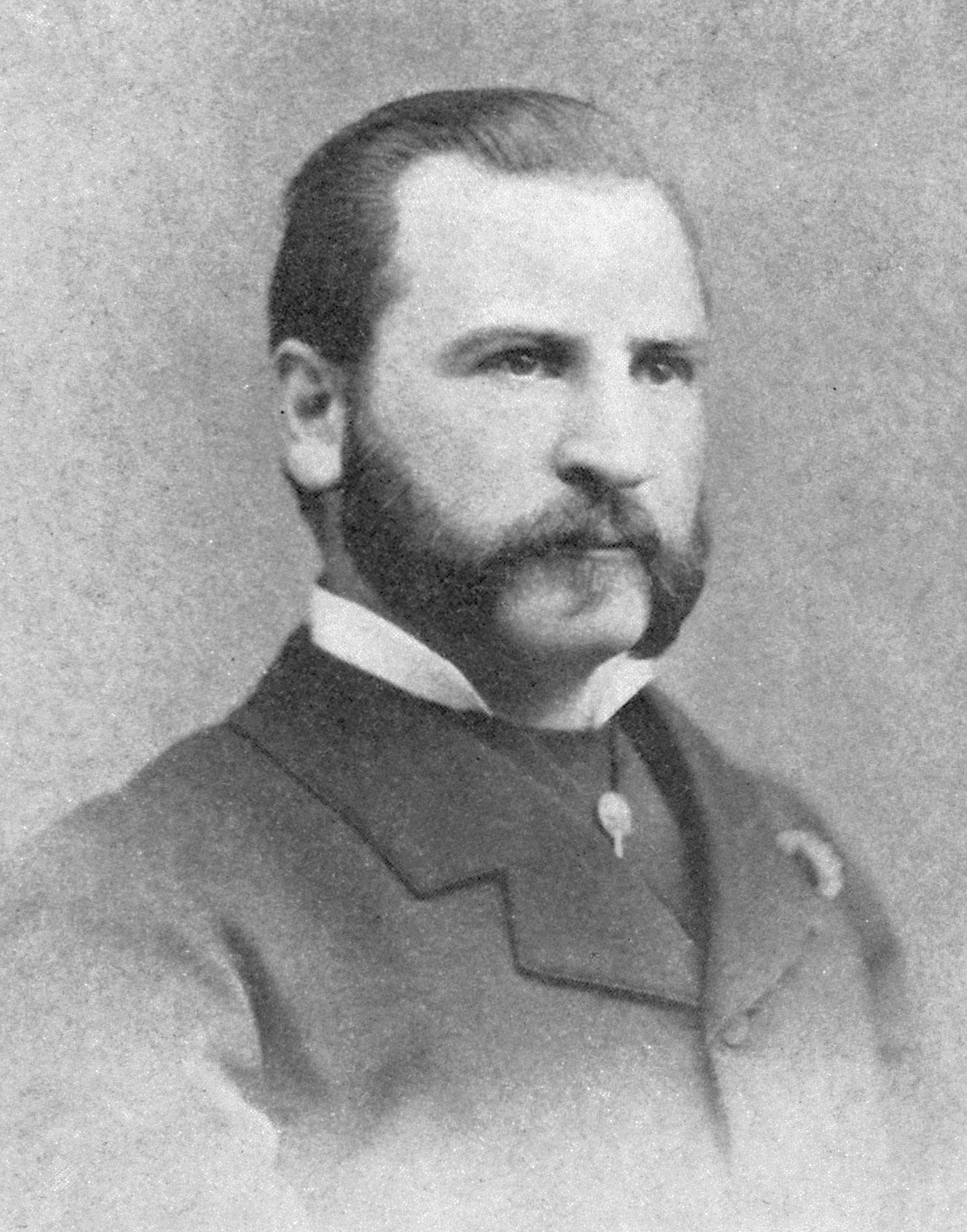
Charles de Young

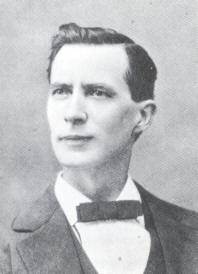
William Cowper Brann

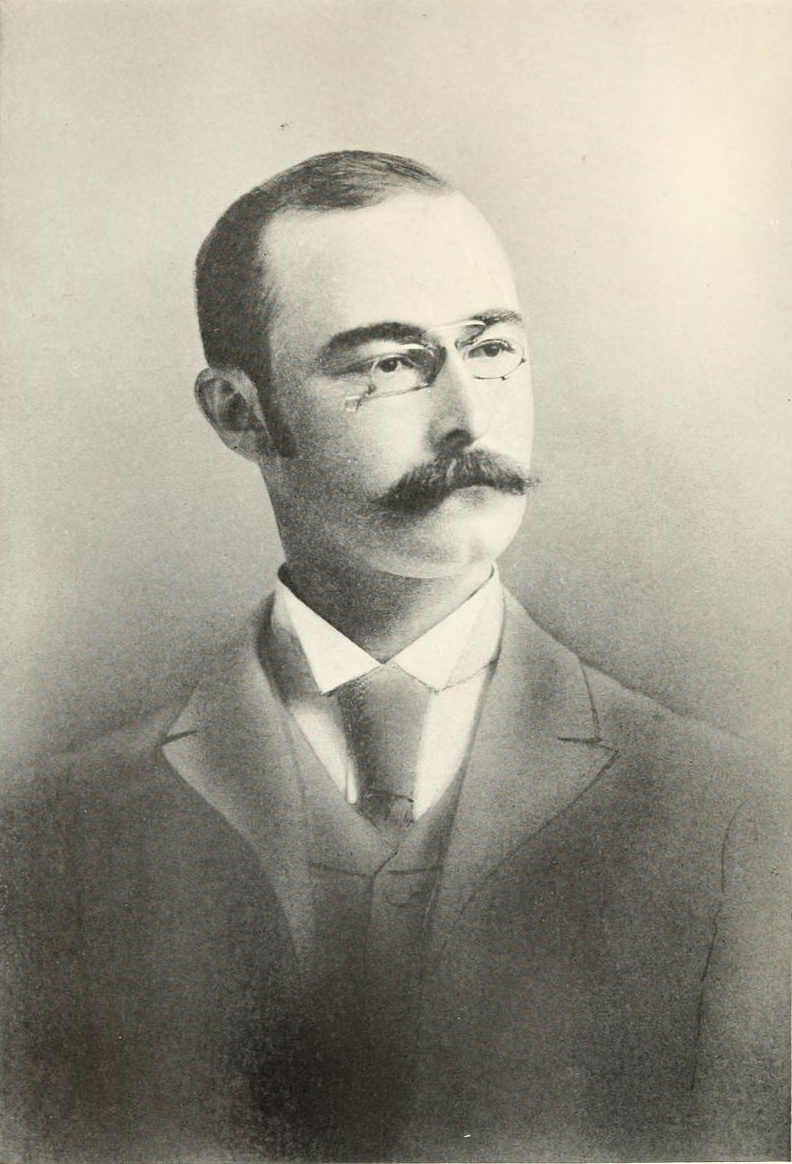
Narciso Gener Gonzales

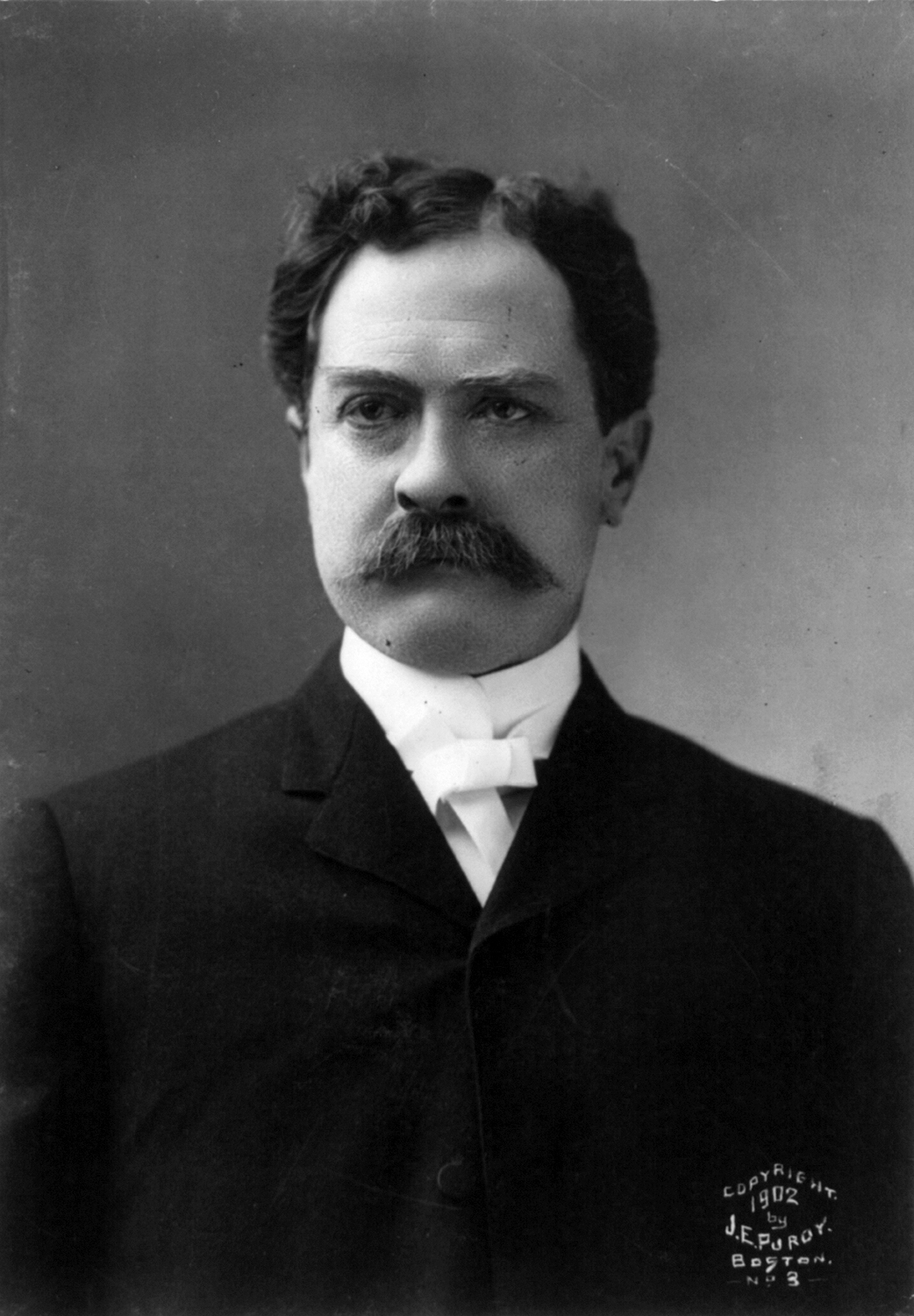
Edward Ward Carmack

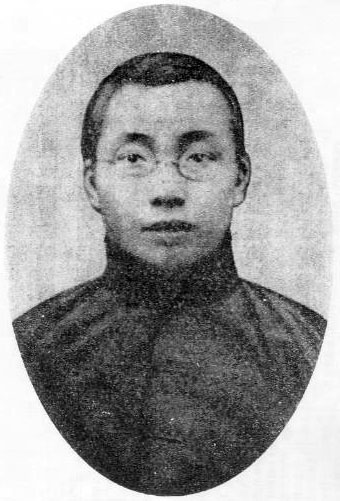
Huang Yuanyong

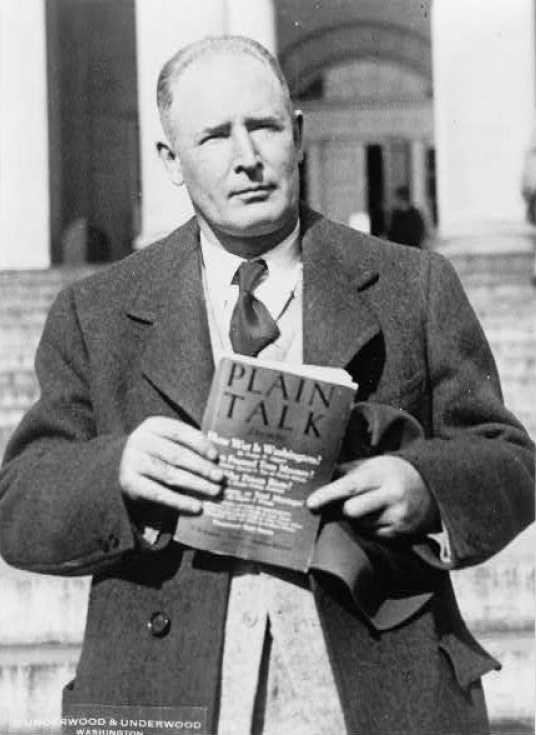
Walter William Liggett

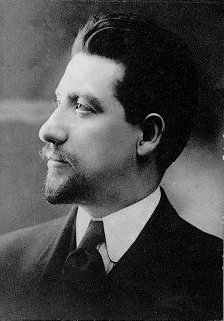
Carlo Tresca

== See also ==
- Censorship in the United States
- Government attacks on journalists in the United States
- List of news aircraft accidents and incidents
- American journalists killed outside of the United States:
  - Marie Colvin, killed by Syrian forces during the Siege of Homs
  - Don Harris, killed during the Jonestown Massacre
  - Paul Klebnikov, murdered in Russia
  - Daniel Pearl, The Wall Street Journal reporter kidnapped and beheaded by jihadist militants in Pakistan
  - Brent Renaud, killed by Russian forces during the Russian invasion of Ukraine
