= Irving W. Carson =

American army captain

Irving W. Carson Capt.
- Born: ca. 1838; Scotland or Connecticut, U.S.
- Died: April 6, 1862; Pittsburg, Tennessee
- Cause of death: Artillery
- Resting place: Chicago, Illinois
- Citizenship: United States of America
- Occupations: Military officer, Journalist
- Known for: Being the first journalist to be killed in the U.S. Civil War.

Irving W. Carson (c. 1838 – April 6, 1862) a captain in the U.S. Army, served as a scout during the American Civil War under the direction of General Ulysses S. Grant, and as a sideline was a journalist for the Civil War. He was in the Battle of Shiloh at Pittsburg Landing, Tennessee, Tennessee, USA and was killed there by artillery, which made him the first journalist to be killed during the war.

== Personal ==
Papers from Grant indicate that Irving W. Carson was born in Scotland, while other records showed he was born in Connecticut in 1838. He moved to Chicago, Illinois, around 1853, when he would have been 14 years old. As an adult, he was described as handsome, 6 foot 2 inches, and thin. He was on the membership lists of the First Baptist Church at the end of the 1850s. He was also a member of the Illinois Republican Party by the time that Abraham Lincoln was elected president.

== Career ==
Carson was a wagon maker and then he worked for the Illinois Central Railroad in Chicago. He was a conductor. He left the railroad to study law, served as a law clerk until he could practice law in 1860 at 22 years of age. He signed on with the Chicago Tribune as a correspondent while with the Dragoons.

=== Military service ===
He enlisted as a private in an organization called Barker's Dragoons, which lasted from April 19 to August 18, 1861. The men that belonged to these Independent Illinois Volunteer Cavalry Companies refused to enlist for 3 years. While some members broke away from Charles W. Barker, Carson stayed loyal. As a member of the Dragoons, he served as a scout for Gen. Benjamin M. Prentiss. Later, he became a scout for General Ulysses S. Grant at the rank of captain. According to Grant, correspondence on March 26, 1862, indicate that Carson traveled to reach General Don Carlos Buell, by walking for four days and passing three Confederate States of America camps.

== Death ==
Capt. Irving W. Carson was killed at the Battle of Shiloh in Pittsburg Landing, Tennessee.

While reporting to Grant on the first day of the battle at Pittsburgh Landing, Capt. Carson was near Buell and Grant at the Battle of Shiloh sometime around 5 p.m. or 6 p.m. on April 6, 1862. Shells had already killed men close by them. When Carson stepped away to encourage men to fight, he was killed by a cannonball that hit him in the face. The incident is often described as ghastly or horrific. On the second day, Grant led his force to victory over the Confederate Army.

=== Funeral ===
Carson was given full military honors at his funeral that was held at First Baptist Church in Chicago on April 20, 1862. The procession happened on Laselle Street, it involved a cavalcade and many officers who served him. It went all the way through the city and ended at Rosehill Cemetery, where his ashes were buried among the other Civil War soldiers.

== Context ==
After the Battle, members of the military, including General William Tecumseh Sherman, and the public, were angry that General Grant had not properly acknowledged Carson and others for their role. Carson was reporting to Grant as a military scout at the time of death. Albert D. Richardson, correspondent for the New York Tribune, had knowledge that Grant was behind the batteries, conversing with an officer when Carson was killed, spattering Grant's clothing with blood. Richardson, along with Charles B. Kimbell, worried about the reputation of a revered general officer, but it was important to know that Grant had nearly been killed. It was Carson's death that led Ebenezer Hannaford to state, "But what shall we say of this case, where a brave man met the most tragic of deaths, and his name- nay, even his fate- was not so much hinted."

== Impact ==
During the Civil War, between eight and 16 journalists died either through sickness or battlefield-related causes, including Carson. It's possible that Carson's connections to the Chicago Tribune and his serving under Grant eventually promoted him to captain. Both Carson and L. Walter Buckingham of the New York Herald have both been killed as a result of enemy action during the American Civil War. Buckingham died in Virginia, June 23, 1863.

== Reactions ==
Ebenezer Hannaford and the soldiers in the 10th brigade said that Carson's death was a ghastly event that became part of the history of the 6th Ohio Volunteer Infantry Regiment. General Sherman himself expressed great displeasure with Grant's failure to say anything about the death of Carson. Sherman had every member who commanded troops at battle provide statements for protection against such untruthful assaults in the future.

Almost 140 years later, descriptions of Carson's murder still focused on the image of his partially severed head.

== As a source ==
- Carson's reports have found their way into the works of Civil War history.The USS Carondelet: A Civil War Ironclad on Western Waters by Myron J. Smith, Jr.

== See also ==
- List of journalists killed in the United States
