= Nadezhda Kehayova =

Bulgarian journalist and television producer (1978–2018)

Nadezhda Kehayova (Bulgarian: Надежда Кехайова; 26 April 1978 – 5 November 2018) was a Bulgarian journalist and television producer.

== Information ==
Nadezhda Kehayova graduated with a degree in literature from The University of Plovdiv (2006). She had published numerous articles and critiques in newspapers and magazines in Bulgaria. She had worked for news agencies, such as Bulgarian National Television. For 6 years she had been an executive producer of the oldest TV game in Bulgaria “Minuta e mnogo” (A minute is too much), Bulgarian National Television and of the radio game “Za edin chas” (For one hour), Bulgarian National Radio. She founded advertising and film production company TV Entertainment since 2006. Nadezhda Kehayova was a screenwriter and producer of many documentaries, including “Europe for us,” 2004, which has the biggest prize of The Bulgarian Europe festival. She had 8 awards for journalism and two as a producer and author of the web site “A minute is too much.”

She died of a heart attack at the age of 40 on 5 November 2018.
