= Mark Kellogg (reporter) =

American newspaper reporter (1831-1876)

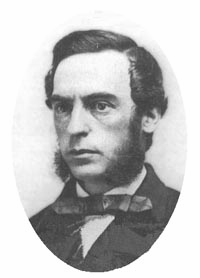
- Date and photographer unknown.
- Born: Marcus Henry Kellogg; Between March 1831 and March 1834; Brighton, Canada
- Died: June 25, 1876; Near the Little Bighorn River in the eastern Montana Territory
- Occupation: Newspaper reporter

Marcus Henry Kellogg (early 1830s – June 25, 1876) was a newspaper reporter killed at the Battle of the Little Bighorn. Born in Canada, Kellogg moved with his family to the United States. In 1851, the Kelloggs settled in La Crosse, Wisconsin, where Kellogg was employed as a telegrapher. In 1862, during the American Civil War, he began working for the La Crosse Democrat, a local paper. In 1867, he lost an election for the office of city clerk, and his wife died the next month. Leaving La Crosse, Kellogg was an editor for a paper in Council Bluffs, Iowa, in 1868. By the time the paper failed later that year, Kellogg was no longer associated with it.

Beginning in 1871, Kellogg was a correspondent for the St. Paul Pioneer, during the early 1870s, he resided primarily in Brainerd, Minnesota, and Bismarck, North Dakota. For a time in 1873, Kellogg was employed by Clement Lounsberry's paper the Bismarck Tribune. In 1876, Kellogg accompanied Lieutenant Colonel George Armstrong Custer and the 7th Cavalry Regiment on an expedition against Native Americans, possibly as a replacement for Lounsberry. Kellogg's reports were written for Lounsberry and the Bismarck Tribune, but they were picked up in papers across the country. Kellogg was accompanying Custer's wing of the 7th Cavalry on June 25, 1876, when it was annihilated at Little Bighorn. He is considered the first correspondent for the Associated Press to die in the line of duty.

== Life ==
Born in Brighton, on Lake Ontario, in Canada, Marcus Henry Kellogg was the third of ten children. Kellogg's date of birth has been reported as March 31, 1831; March 31, 1833; or as being in March of either 1832, 1833, or 1834. The 1860 census listed Kellog as being 26 years old, while the 1870 census reported that he was 38. Kellogg's family moved a number of times in his youth before they eventually settled in La Crosse, Wisconsin, in 1851. Kellogg had previously learned to operate a telegraph while living with his family in Waukegan, Illinois, and went to work for both the Northwestern Telegraph Company and the Atlantic and Pacific Telegraph Company after the move to La Crosse. He supported Abraham Lincoln in the 1860 United States presidential election.

He married Martha J. Robinson in 1861 and they had two daughters. In 1862, Kellogg left his telegrapher's job and went to work for the La Crosse Democrat, a politically partisan outlet operated by Marcus M. Pomeroy. With the American Civil War ongoing, Kellogg's political views had shifted from support of Lincoln, as Pomeroy was an anti-war Copperhead. There is some dispute among historians as to whether Kellogg was a devoted Copperhead as well, or if his actions were motivated by opportunism. In September and October of that year, Kellogg was involved in local political conventions; he still had some Republican activities during this time period as well. Kellogg did not join the military during the war. In 1864, he was involved with a local volunteer fire company. In September 1865, Kellogg and a business partner purchased a store, but it burned down in December. Kellogg reopend the store in January 1866, but there is evidence that it performed poorly financially. He also played shortstop on one of the town's baseball teams.

In April 1867, he unsuccessfully ran for the office of city clerk of La Crosse; the next month his wife died. He left his daughters to be raised by an aunt, or by their grandparents. By 1868, he was an editor for the Democrat, a politically partisan newspaper in Council Bluffs, Iowa. The paper went defunct late that year and was sold to Pomeroy; by then, Kellogg was not longer actively associated with it. The downfall of the Democrat led to a break between Kellogg and Pomeroy. Little is known about the following several years of Kellogg's life. The 1870 census reported that he was living with his late wife's parents and his daughters in La Crosse and working as a printer. An article published in the St. Paul Pioneer Press and Tribune shortly after his death stated that he had been employed as a telegrapher with the Northern Pacific Railroad while the railroad was built from Duluth, Minnesota, to Bismarck, North Dakota. Some writers have proposed that this occupied Kellogg's life from 1870 to 1873. Biographer Sandy Barnard notes that a column written by Kellogg under his pen name in early 1876 states the he spent the winter of 1869–1870 in Aitkin, Minnesota. Under Barnard's chronology, Kellogg was employed as a telegrapher by the railroad beginning in mid-1871, and that by mid-1872 he was residing in Brainerd, Minnesota. He also worked as a string correspondent for the St. Paul Dispatch beginning in 1871, with his articles published under the pen name of "Frontier.".

Barnard has Kellogg employed beginning in 1872 by a pro-Horace Greeley newspaper in Brainerd known as the Greeley Wave, This represented another switch in Kellogg's political affiliation, this time to the Liberal Republicans in 1872. Kellog was nominated for election to the Minnesota Legislature that year, but was defeated. He was also involved in the state militia, the Freemasons, and the local fire department, but in 1873 he was dropped from the ranks of the militia and was expelled from the Masonic lodge. In May 1873, he relocated from Brainerd to Bismarch, Dakota Territory. In mid-1873, Civil War veteran and newspaperman Clement A. Lounsberry founded The Bismarck Tribune. Lounsberry soon hired Kellogg, and Kellogg was the editor for several of the earliest issues of the paper, as Lounsberry was out of town. Kellog was only a part-time employee of the paper.

During the winter of 1873-1874, Kellogg had little to do with the Tribune according to Barnard, and it is not clear exactly what he did during that time, although there is some evidence that he was employed by the county government, likely as a jailer. During mid-1874, Kellogg was employed with a hay cutting camp. Later that year, he campaigned for M. K. Armstrong's unsuccessful congressional campaign, and in December he published a letter under his Frontier pen name criticizing alleged fraud by a younger brother of President Ulysses S. Grant and others committed in the trade with the Native Americans. Kellogg also wrote negatively about the Native Americans themselves, writing "I have no romance in my nature regarding Indians. I look upon them as a whole, as a lying, thievish set; dirty, lazy and degraded; among the lowest of God's creatures". When Bismarck incorporated in 1875, Kellogg wrote a column for the Pioneer opposing the decision. Besides his work for the county and some evidence that he did occasional work for the Bismarck Tribune, it is not entirely clear what Kellogg did for a living in early 1875; the county was having trouble paying the sums owed to Kellogg. He spent the winter of 1875-1876 in Aitkin, although what he did there is unclear.

== Battle of the Little Bighorn ==
In March 1876, the Bismarck Tribune printed an announcement that a correspondent for the paper would accompany George Armstrong Custer on the latter's expedition later that year. Lounsberry claimed after the fact that he intended to be the reporter to accompany the expedition, but that he was unable to after his wife fell ill and that Kellogg was sent as a substitute. This has largely been accepted by posterity as accurate, although Barnard believes that Lounsberry never actually intended to accompany the expedition for political, business, and personal reasons. In early 1876, Lounsberry and Kellogg were on the same westbound train between St. Paul and Bismarck as Custer and his wife when it became stuck in snow; Kellogg may have been the telegrapher that sent the signals requesting help. When Kellogg first arrived in Bismarck again in March, it was reported that he intended to go to the Black Hills with a mining party. Barnard believes that Lounsberry convinced Kellogg to accompany Custer around this time, and Kellogg did not make the mining trip. Lounsberry expected Kellogg would cover nothing more than a sensational military victory.

Kellogg joined Custer's column on May 14. His first of four dispatches back was published on May 17, the day the command left Fort Abraham Lincoln. Lounsberry published another dispatch from Kellogg on May 25. Kellogg dated his third dispatch, which was longer than the prior two, as of May 29; it was published on June 14. Writings from Kellogg, or versions of Kellogg's writings that Lounsberry had edited, were published in other papers, including the Chicago Times and the New York Herald. The fourth dispatch was dated June 12 but had been written over the course of several days. It was published on June 21. In it, he wrote "By the time this reaches you we will have met and fought the red devils, with what result remains to be seen. I go with Custer and will be at the death." Kellogg was likely not predicting his own death or Custer's defeat, but was instead using a poetic expression derived from foxhunting.

Lieutenant Colonel Custer's command, the 7th Cavalry Regiment, was part of a larger force commanded by Alfred Terry, which cooperated with two other prongs of the United States Army's campaign against the Native Americans. On June 25, the 7th Cavalry encountered a Native American village, and Custer split his regiment into two groups to assail the village. The portion of the regiment that accompanied Custer, a force of about 210 men, was completely annihilated in the ensuing Battle of the Little Bighorn. Including losses from the other wing of the regiment, 268 of the men from the expedition were killed. Kellogg had accompanied Custer's portion of the regiment.

== Aftermath ==
Colonel John Gibbon, whose men arrived at the battle on Tuesday, June 27, and also helped bury the dead, said he found Kellogg's body by itself on June 29 in a ravine near a ford across the Little Bighorn River; his body had been missed by an earlier burial detail. While some observers thought they recognized Kellogg's body on Custer Ridge, others provided testimony that Kellogg's body was near the river. One lieutenant stated that Kellogg's body was "some distance from the field of battle". The archaeologist Richard Allan Fox believes that the reports that Kellogg fell near the river are correct. The marker placed on the battlefield for Kellogg is located on the east side of Last Stand Hill, but the historical evidence strongly suggests that this placement is not correct. Kellogg's body was scalped and missing an ear; he was identified by the boots he wore. His body had not been stripped unlike the other dead, and his corpse had suffered less mutilation that most of the others. Barnard speculates that this means that Kellogg was likely killed early in the combat, with his body within the range of guns from the surviving soldiers and that by the time the position had collapsed and the Native Americans had moved forward, Kellogg's body had been passed by.

When news of the disaster reached Bismarck on July 5, Lounsberry quickly put together a special issue, which he published in the Bismarck Tribune the next day. This was the first full reporting of the battle, and Lounsberry spread the news across the country. Kellogg is considered the first Associated Press correspondent to die in the line of duty. Some of Kellogg's diary and notes survived the battle and these, along with his news accounts, are one of the primary historical sources for information on the days preceding the battle. His notes are now in the possession of the State Historical Society of North Dakota. His satchel, pencil, and eyeglasses were displayed in the Newseum in Washington, DC.

== See also ==
- List of journalists killed in the United States
