= John A. Kelly =

American journalist

John Andrew "Jack" Kelly (November 30, 1943 – June 28, 1978) was an American investigative journalist in Boston, Massachusetts, who was one of the victims of the Blackfriars Massacre.

== Early life ==
Kelly was born in the Drexel Hill suburb of Philadelphia to Francis G. Kelly (1901–1966) and Rose M. (née Lally) Kelly (1908–1973). His sister Kathleen was born in 1946. Francis Kelly was a salesman for Corn Products, which led the family to move to Manchester, New Hampshire in 1949. In 1952, the family settled in Brighton, Massachusetts and his father continued to work for Corn Products in South Boston. In Brighton, Kelly attended St. Columbkille School, where he was inspired to write "The Sisters and the Kids, a humorous story about parochial school life, published in 1973 in The Boston Globe Magazine in 1973.

== Military service ==
After graduating St. Columbkille School, Kelly joined the U.S. Air Force and left for basic training at Lackland AFB, on July 1, 1961, aged 17. After, he was deployed to what was then Formosa, where he started his radio career in Armed Forces Radio. After returning to the United States he was stationed in Maryland. Upon his honorable discharge from the US Air Force, he took a job with Metropolitan Life Insurance and married Michele Larichiuta in 1964.

== Career ==
In 1967, the family moved to Brighton, Massachusetts, where he worked for Ross Laboratories. In 1968, he joined WCAS (AM) as a reporter and producer of documentaries. In 1969, while working for WEZE, Kelly won an area wide reputation for hard hitting investigative reporting, including the first story on Senator Edward Kennedy's involvement in the Chappaquiddick incident three hours before any other station in the country had the story. In 1970, he joined WBZ (AM) News, where he significantly contributed as investigative reporter for several years, earning awards for excellence in reporting from United Press International. Kelly joined WNAC-TV in 1974 as an investigative reporter.

== Death ==
John Kelly died in the Blackfriars Massacre in 1978, aged 34. He was survived by his wife, their children, and one sister.

== See also ==
- List of journalists killed in the United States
- List of unsolved murders (1900–1979)
