= List of Slovenian journalists =

A list of notable journalists from Slovenia:

== A – G ==
- Louis Adamic
- Ivan Ahčin
- Valentin Areh
- Milko Bambič
- Janez Bleiweis
- Izidor Cankar
- Andrej Einspieler
- Jurij Gustinčič

== H – P ==
- Dušan Jelinčič
- Zoran Jerin
- Josip Jurčič
- Miško Kranjec
- Alojzij Kuhar
- Fran Levstik
- Miša Molk
- Miran Ogrin
- Vladimir Pavšič
- Albin Prepeluh
- Alenka Puhar

== R – T ==
- Anja Rupel
- Katja Špur
- Janez Stanič
- Josip Stritar

== V – Ž ==
- Valentin Vodnik
- Dimitrij Volčič
- Janez J. Švajncer
