= Bill Biggart =

American photojournalist (1947–2001)

William G. Biggart
- Born: July 20, 1947; Berlin, Germany
- Died: September 11, 2001 (aged 54); New York City, U.S
- Cause of death: Injuries sustained from the collapse of the North Tower during the September 11 attacks
- Body discovered: September 15, 2001
- Monuments: National September 11 Memorial & Museum – South Pool, Panel S-66
- Occupations: Photojournalist; Photographer
- Years active: 1985—2001
- Employer: Impact Visuals
- Spouse: Wendy Doremus
- Children: 3
- Website: www.billbiggart.com

William G. Biggart (July 20, 1947 – September 11, 2001) was an American freelance photojournalist and a victim of the September 11 attacks, notable for his street-view photographs of the event before being killed by the collapse of the World Trade Center's North Tower. He was the only professional photographer to be killed while covering the attacks.

On September 15, 2001, four days after the attacks, Biggart's remains were discovered along with a bag containing his three cameras and the CompactFlash card from which his last photographs were recovered. The photos were used in the October 15, 2001, issue of Newsweek. His photographs from 9/11 were exhibited at the International Center of Photography and the Smithsonian's National Museum of American History. They have also been preserved on the Internet by The Digital Journalist.

== Personal life ==
A child of an American officer stationed in Germany, Bill Biggart was born in Berlin in 1947. Biggart was one of 12 siblings in his Irish-Catholic family. As an adult, he moved into a loft in Lower Manhattan, New York City, about the same time that the WTC was opening in the 1970s.

Biggart was married twice and had three children. He had one son from his first marriage. Biggart's second wife was Wendy Doremus, and they had two children.

== Career ==
Biggart started out as a commercial photographer and he soon began to pursue an interest in spot news photography. He was at Wounded Knee to photograph the 1973 incident. He would also sometimes take jobs for theater productions. With a passion for news, he transitioned to photojournalism in 1985. His photojournalism credits are found in the international stories he covered in the West Bank and Israel in 1988, Northern Ireland, and the first Gulf War. He was also frequently credited for photographs that captured news events closer to his home in New York City, such as a NYC subway shot of "subway vigilante" Bernhard Goetz, Howard Beach, or the 1989 funeral of Yusuf Hawkins. He was also present in Berlin to photograph the fall of the Berlin Wall in November 1989.

Biggart began working for the Impact Visuals photo news agency in 1988 and he continued to work there until he was killed. He also worked as a freelance photographer for Reuters, Agence France Press, and Sipa Press. His work appeared in The New York Times, The Christian Science Monitor, The Village Voice, and The City Sun.

=== September 11 attacks ===
On the morning of September 11, 2001, a passing taxi driver alerted Biggart to the fact that a plane had just crashed into the World Trade Center. A "news junkie", according to those who were close to him, Biggart ran to his apartment near Union Square, grabbed three cameras (two film, one digital) and began walking the two miles toward the center, where fire trucks were located, shooting photographs along the way, including digital, color film and slide images. He eventually found himself at the World Trade Center shooting the Twin Towers as they burned, and continued taking photos after the South Tower collapsed. His wife called Biggart on his cell phone shortly after the first tower's collapse. According to her, Biggart said he was with the firemen and safe, and he would meet her in 20 minutes.

Another photographer, Bolivar Arellano of the New York Post, observed that Biggart was photographing the second tower before it fell, and that Biggart was closer than any other photographer, and closer than Arellano felt was safe. Bill Biggart took his last photo at 10:28:24 a.m. EDT, about 20 minutes after his phone call with his wife. At 10:28:31 a.m., the North Tower collapsed. Falling debris from the tower killed him instantly. His last photograph was presented as a highlight of the 2002 exhibit at the National Museum of American History. In the days following the tower's collapse, Biggart was reported among the missing. His wife searched for him at news agencies and hospitals. Four days later, his remains and camera equipment were recovered from the tower debris.

Biggart took over 300 photographs of the event, 154 of which were recovered from Biggart's digital storage devices by Biggart's friend, photographer Chip East. Biggart’s photos have been included in various exhibits and are his most well-known photographs.

=== Imperial War Museum installation ===
In September 2026, to mark the 25th anniversary of the September 11 attacks, a permanent photography installation featuring Biggart's work opened at the Imperial War Museum London. The display, which marks the first permanent public exhibition of his 9/11 photographs outside of the United States, features his street-level imagery alongside work by Associated Press photographer Suzanne Plunkett, arranged around a piece of structural steel recovered from Ground Zero. The opening of the permanent exhibition and the narrative behind his final frames were profiled by BBC Radio 4 in the documentary feature Artworks - Last Frames: The Story of Bill Biggart, broadcast on 8 September 2026.

== Memorials ==
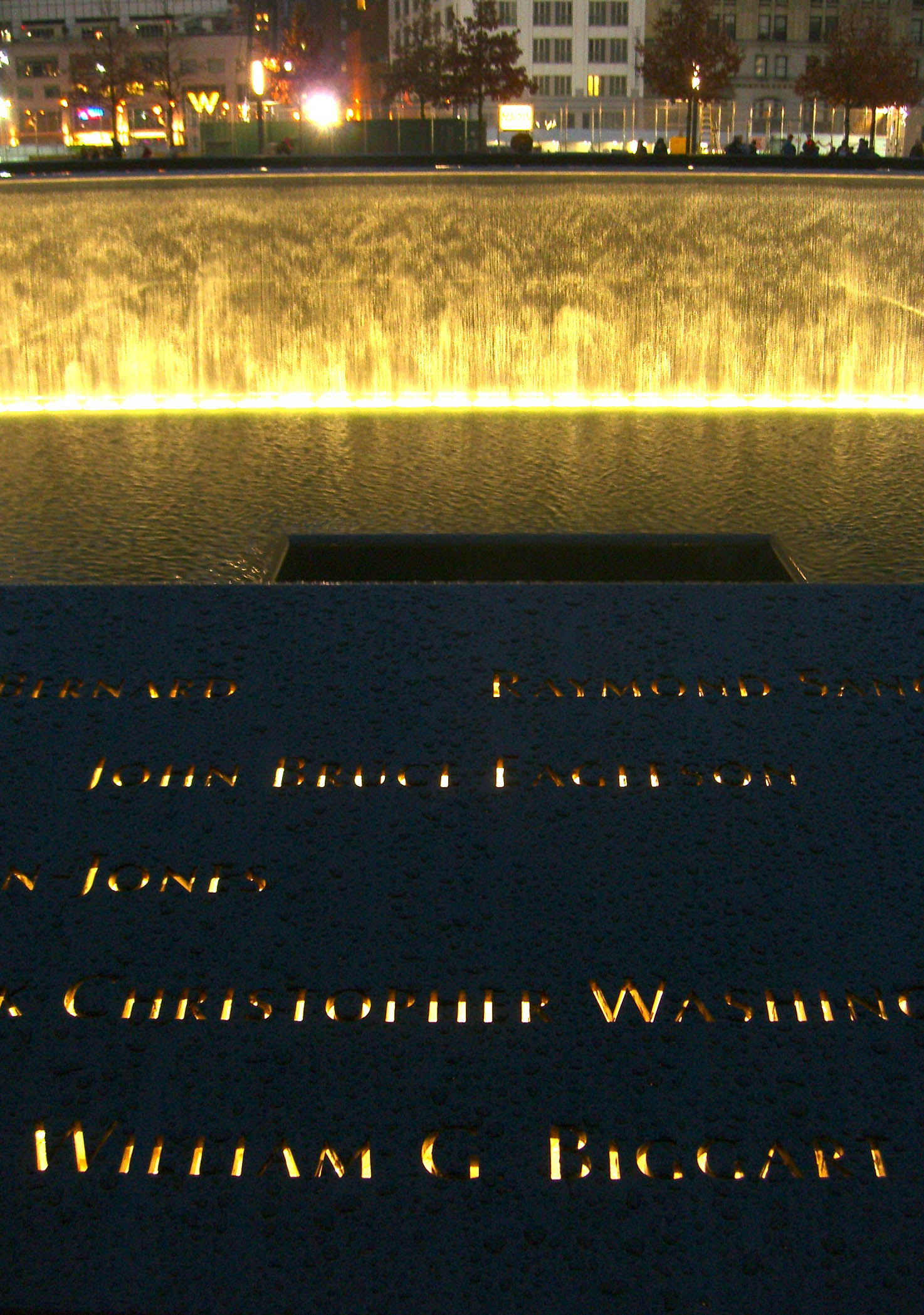
Biggart's name is located on Panel S-66 of the National September 11 Memorial's South Pool, along with those of passengers of Flight 77.

- Biggart's name was added to The Freedom Forum Journalists Memorial at the Newseum in Washington, D.C., in 2001.
- At the National September 11 Memorial & Museum, Biggart is memorialized at the South Pool, on Panel S-66.

== Creative works ==
- Ireland: A Week in the Life of A Nation (1986 U.K.)
- Running Towards Danger: Stories Behind the Breaking News of 9/11 (2002, Newseum)

== Exhibits ==
- Aftermath: Reflections on The Anniversary of September 11, Bill Biggart: Final Exposures, International Center of Photography, New York City, 2002.
- Bearing Witness to History, Smithsonian's National Museum of American History, Washington, D.C., 2002.
- Bill Biggart's cameras from 9/11 are on display at the Newseum in Washington, D.C., April 11, 2008.

== See also ==
- List of journalists killed in the United States
- List of solved missing person cases (2000s)
