= Petko Bocharov =

Bulgarian journalist and translator

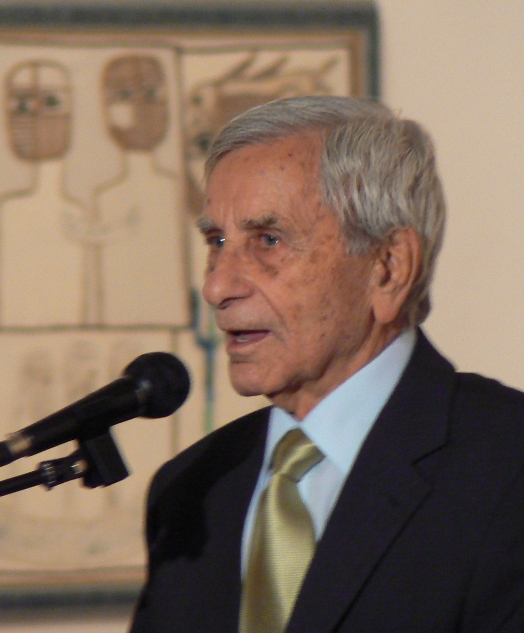
Petko-Bocharov-20101104-1

Petko Bocharov (19 February 1919 – 2 March 2016) was a Bulgarian journalist and translator. He became the oldest active journalist in the world before his death and is a well-known figure in Bulgarian culture.

== Biography ==
Bocharov was born on 19 February 1919 in Sofia, Bulgaria. He graduated from the American College of Sofia and then went on to read law in Sofia University. Bocharov was an agent for the Committee for State Security in Bulgaria from 1946 to 1982. Bocharov started working for the Bulgarian News Agency in 1952, eventually rising to deputy-chief contributing editor. He retired in 1983. Bocharov died on March 2, 2016, aged 97, after a brief illness.,

== See also ==
- List of journalists
- List of Bulgarians
- List of Bulgarian journalists
