= List of journalists killed in Pakistan =

This is a list of the journalists killed in Pakistan:

- Janullah Hashimzada
- Murtaza Razvi
- Daniel Pearl

== See also ==
- List of journalists killed during the Balochistan conflict (1947–present)
