= Minuta e mnogo =

- Genre: competition
- Country of origin: Bulgaria
- Original language: Bulgarian

Production
- Producer: BNT
- Production location: Sofia
- Camera setup: Multi-camera
- Running time: 50 minutes

Original release
- Network: BNT1
- Release: 22 February 1980 – 31 December 2011

Minuta e mnogo (Bulgarian: Минута е много, lit. 'A minute is a lot') is a Bulgarian television competition.

== History ==
The idea for this television broadcast was of Prof. Lilya Raycheva. The pilot episode of the show was broadcast on 22 February 1980 on BNT 1 with the original plan was for only five episodes to be aired. Due to high viewers' interest however, the show remains on air. The 100th episode, aired on 25 December 1987, was meant as the series' final episode, but on 3 April 1992, by invitation from the Bulgarian National Television's directors, the show was re-launched on Channel 1 (formerly BNT 1). In 1993 the show wins the BNT award for the best television game show.

In 2003 the production goes from being directly produced by the BNT to different production company - TV Box. The show continued to be part of BNT 1's broadcasting schedule until its cancellation on 31 December 2011. At the time of cancellation, a total 756 episodes were broadcast.

== Rules ==
Throughout the years the show changed its rules, but kept the trivia concept as its core. In the broadcast three contestants compete. They answer questions from different categories – science, history, geography, literature and sport among others. During the game they earn money and books as prizes.

== Theme song ==
The show's opening theme song is Pink Floyd's Time.

== Hosts ==
- 1980–2011 – Petar Vuchkov
- 2003–2011 – Stefan Spasov
