= Oggy Boytchev =

British journalist

Oggy Boytchev after directing an interview with HM King Abdullah of Saudi Arabia

Oggy Boytchev in Fallujah, Iraq

Ognian Boytchev (Bulgarian: Огнян Бойчев), commonly known as Oggy Boytchev is a British journalist and independent producer with more than 20 years experience at the BBC in London. He has worked as a producer to the BBC World Affairs Editor, John Simpson. Born in Cherven Briag, Bulgaria, Boytchev defected to Britain in January 1986.

His first job was a newsreader with the Bulgarian Section of the BBC World Service. He then worked as a foreign duty editor at Radio 4 and a sub editor in the World Service newsroom before moving to BBC Television in 1996. As a television producer he has worked in more than 40 countries and in the world's main war zones: Iraq, Afghanistan, Lebanon, Kosovo. He worked as John Simpson's producer in Northern Iraq during the war against Saddam Hussein in 2003.

In January 2008, Oggy Boytchev and John Simpson worked undercover in Harare, Zimbabwe in spite of a ban on the BBC by the regime of Robert Mugabe. Boytchev produced and directed John Simpson's reports from Iran during the street riots in Tehran after the disputed presidential elections in June 2009. He was arrested during his time in Iran. He has produced and directed some of John Simpson's interviews with World leaders and some of the editions of Simpson's World.

He has produced and directed news reports and documentaries from Iraq, Afghanistan, South Africa, Iran, Israel, Gaza, the United States, and North Africa.

Boytchev's book Simpson & I was published in 2014. The Unbeliever, a work of historical fiction based on a real-life Cold War spy who sold secrets to the CIA, was published in 2018. BULLION: The Mystery of Gaddafi's Gold, a political action thriller, was published in 2023.
