= Fritz d'Or =

- Born: ca. 1953; Haiti
- Died: March 15, 1991 (age 38); Little Haiti, Miami, Florida, United States
- Cause of death: Gunshot
- Other name: Fritz Dor
- Occupations: Radio journalist and talk show host; paralegal
- Employer: WLQY-AM (1320)

Fritz d'Or, or Fritz Dor (c. 1953 – 15 March 1991), was a Haitian American journalist and radio talk show host for WLQY-AM (1320) who was assassinated by Billy Alexander in Miami, Florida, for voicing his support for the new Haitian democracy and the elected Haitian President Jean-Bertrand Aristide, who would be ousted by the military regime led by General Raoul Cédras in September 1991.

== Early life ==
Political activists described Fritz d'Or as "the heart of the community" in Little Haiti. D'Or had four children and took care of his paralyzed brother. D'Or was an active member of a Haitian-American political organization known as Veye Yo. Aside from his political radio commentary, Dor was both on the board of directors and worked as a paralegal at the Haitian Refugee Center, in addition to his involvement in multiple community education programs. He worked at WLQY-AM (1320) as a pro-democratic and pro-Aristide Creole-language commentator and political reporter.

== Death ==
After receiving several threats, D'Or was fatally shot four times and killed by Billy Alexander for US$2,000 at 8:55 p.m. on Friday, March 15, 1991. At the time he was standing outside his office close to the intersection of Northeast Second Avenue and 59th Street in Little Haiti, in Miami, Florida. Police later found a death list with d'Or's name on it, as well as two other prominent Haitian journalists. Billy Alexander, a Haitian American, was convicted of killing d'Or. It was alleged that Alexander, born ca. 1970, was contracted to kill d'Or for his opposition to Louis Thermitus, a local record store owner, who d'Or had accused of being a member of the Tonton Macoute and of supporting the regime that had ousted Haiti's elected President Aristide. At the time of his arraignment and later his conviction for the murder of d'Or and Jean-Claude Olivier, another radio journalist, Alexander was serving a life sentence for killing Alcee Lissitte during an unrelated incident of robbery. The lookout man for the contract killing, Glossy Bruce Joseph, was arrested in May 1991 and later convicted and sentenced to 25 years in 1993. Hitler Fleurinord was charged with conspiracy to commit murder and accused of being the driver. Thermitus was never implicated or charged in the murders.

== Context ==
The Haitian community in Little Haiti, Miami, numbered 60,000 people. The murder of Fritz d'Or took place there after the Haitian general election, 1990–1991 produced Haiti's first democratically elected president and after President Jean-Bertrand Aristide assumed power in February 1991. The Haitian refugee community was divided over the ouster of Aristide by the military regime.

The first political violence was the murder on 18 February 1991 of another reporter, Jean-Claude Olivier, who held similar pro-democracy views as d'Or. Initially, the police were unable to establish a connection between the two murders. However, as more killings and attacks occurred, a pattern emerged. Ringo Cayard, another radio talk show host with pro-democracy views, owned a building that was destroyed by an explosion one week after d'Or was murdered. Dona St. Plite was the third journalist killed when he was at a benefit for d'Or's family on 24 October 1993. The fourth murder, on 9 March 1994, was political activist Daniel Buron, who like d'Or was a member of Veye Yo. Police believed all four cases were similar because each victim was outspoken and advocated for Aristide and democracy.

== Impact ==
The murder of Fritz d'Or was the second in a string of political attacks by supporters of the former Haitian military regime who were opposed to Aristide. Jean-Claude Olivier was killed 18 February 1991. The attacks caught attention of the Haitian community. The There was further interest in whether the murders were ordered by the Haitian military regime as that could possibly change the status of refugees from economic to political asylum seekers.

Dor's murder also helped raise awareness of the dangers of ethnic journalism. By the time that d'Or was killed, there had already been eight journalists murdered since 1982, making ethnic journalism one of the field's most hazardous jobs. Most of those murders remained unsolved. While there have been more since Fritz d'Or's own murder, the media has deepened scrutiny into the matter.

== Reactions ==
Fritz d'Or is one of eleven ethnic journalists to be killed in the United States since 1977, which includes Chauncey Bailey.

One thousand people marched through the streets of Little Haiti to protest that no arrests had been in the murder of Olivier and d'Or and within one week the alleged lookout man was arrested.

A former Haitian journalist living in the United States and head of the Haitian Press Association, James Monroe Rosefert, said, "Any time you speak out publicly for Aristide on the radio, you get four or five threatening calls." A lawyer for the Haitian Refugee Center, Steven Forester, said, "If leaders in the Cuban community were being shot this way, the FBI and the White House would be tripping over each other trying to solve this as a national priority. But these are black Haitians, without political clout, and it seems like it's open season on exiles here." The detective in charge of the investigation, Ron Ilhardt, said, "These men were killed for words they spoke over the airwaves."

== See also ==
- List of journalists killed in the United States
