= Mikhail Bocharov =

Russian singer

Mikhail Vasilyevich Bocharov
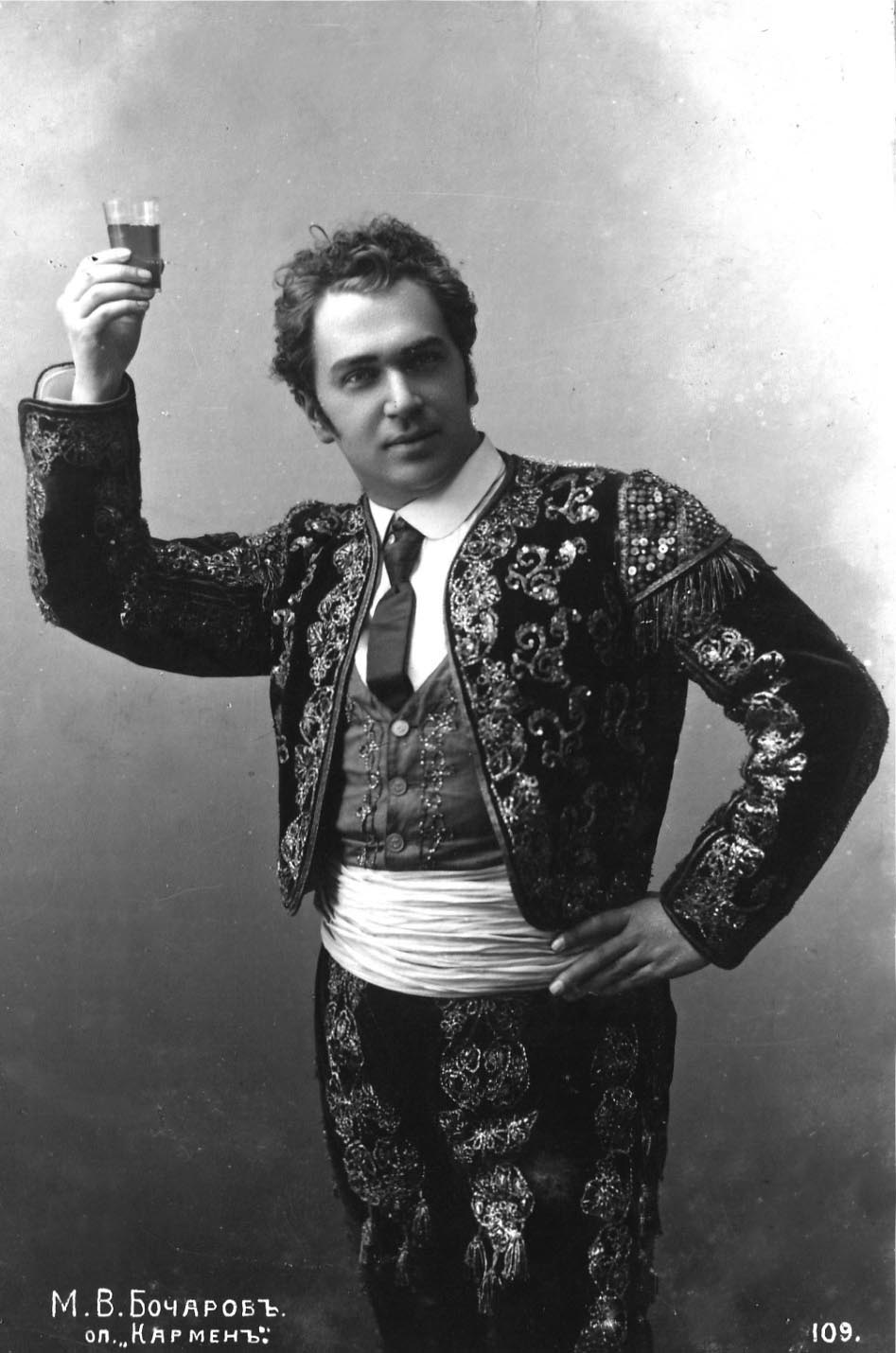
- Born: November 2, 1872
- Died: April 29, 1936 (aged 63)
- Occupation: Singer
- Musical career
- Instrument: Vocals

Mikhail Vasilyevich Bocharov (Russian: Михаил Васильевич Бочаров, 2 November 1872 – 29 April 1936) was an opera singer from the Russian Empire and later the Soviet Union. Vocally speaking, he is best described as a baritone.

He graduated from Kyiv University as a lawyer. He then studied singing with Everardi and Petza at the Kyiv Music College, and graduated in 1898. He continued his education in Italy. Bocharov sang in Kiev opera since 1900, then sang in Moscow (Zimin Opera), St. Petersburg, Odessa and other cities. He was awarded the honorary title Meritorious Artist of Russia in 1925. From 1932 onwards he sang mostly in concerts. He had a voice of a great range and cultivation. His roles include: Escamillo in Carmen, Figaro in The Barber of Seville, Beckmesser in Die Meistersinger von Nürnberg, Gryaznoi in The Tsar's Bride, Ivan-Korolevich in Kashchey the Immortal, Kochubey in Mazeppa, Onegin, Demon, and Rigoletto, as well as various others.

== Bibliography ==
- Shampanier A. (Шампаньер А. – editor and publisher), Russian Theater [Kiev, 1905], pp. 53–54.
