= Blackfriars Massacre =

1978 mob murders in Boston, Massachusetts, US

Coordinates: 42.3535°N 71.0580°W

The 1978 Blackfriars Massacre, also known as the Blackfriars murders, is an unsolved Irish mob and/or Italian-American Mafia massacre that occurred on 18 June 1978, at Blackfriars bar in Downtown Boston, Massachusetts. Five people were killed, including former Channel 7 investigative news anchorman, Jack Kelly, allegedly over a robbery gone wrong.

== Massacre and aftermath ==
Blackfriars was a bar on Summer Street in Downtown Boston owned by Vincent Solmonte. The Irish-themed pub, which also doubled as a late-night disco club, was named after Blackfriars, which was mentioned in William Shakespeare's play Henry VIII.

On the evening of June 27, 1978, Winter Hill Gang member Stephen "the Rifleman" Flemmi visited Blackfriars with a girlfriend, Marilyn DiSilva. After spotting another gangster, Nick Femia, at the club, Flemmi sensed something was amiss and convinced DiSilva to leave the club with him, likely saving her life. In the early hours of June 28, 1978, after the establishment had closed for the night, five men remained at the disco, playing backgammon and using cocaine. Four or five kilograms of cocaine and a large amount of cash were being housed on the premises. A group of gunmen entered Blackfriars through the cellar and robbed the men of the drugs and money. According to Howie Carr, the robbers had not planned to kill anyone until the club manager, John "Jack" Kelly of Framingham, Massachusetts, recognized one of the perpetrators and asked, "Is that you?".

The following morning, the bar's janitor discovered the bullet-riddled corpses of the five victims when he arrived for work. Kelly was found lying face-down, two gunshot wounds in the head, in the cramped, blood-spattered subterranean basement, along with the bodies of Charles Magarian of North Andover, Massachusetts; Peter Meroth of Jamaica Plain, Massachusetts; Freddie Delavega of Somerville, Massachusetts; and the pub/club's owner, Vincent E. Solomonte of Quincy, Massachusetts. Investigators suspected that the five men were surprised while in the middle of a game of backgammon at around 2:00 a.m. and herded into the basement that served as the establishment's office, where they were all shot by one or more intruders wielding at least one shotgun and a .25 caliber semi-automatic pistol. At the scene, investigators discovered a small arsenal of firearms and small quantities of cocaine and marijuana, as well as $15,000 in loose cash in an open safe. The drugs and cash led the police to conclude that the motive behind the massacre was not a robbery. The prevailing police opinion was that it looked to be a classic gangland-style slaying.

The massacre allegedly was over several kilos of cocaine. One of the murder victims, Solomonte, was later discovered to be a close associate and friend of Winter Hill Gang member Stephen Flemmi. The homicide investigators concluded that the five men were all murdered "gangland style".

== Victims ==
- Vincent Solmonte, age 35, owner of the Blackfriars Pub
- Peter Meroth, age 31, of the Jamaica Plain neighborhood of Boston
- Freddy Delavega, 34, of Somerville;
- Charles Magarian, 37, of North Andover;
- John "Jack" Kelly, 34, a journalist who worked as a night manager of the pub. Kelly had formerly been employed as an investigative reporter for WBZ news radio and WNAC-TV (Channel 7). Kelly was survived by his wife and four young children.

== Suspects ==
The Boston Police Department suspected the responsibility of the murders to be orchestrated by one or some of these suspects:

- James J. "Whitey" Bulger, of South Boston, Massachusetts, leader of the Winter Hill Gang, a mostly Irish-American crime family operating in the region of Boston, Massachusetts who was a Top Echelon Informant for the Federal Bureau of Investigation (FBI).
- Stephen "The Rifleman" Flemmi, of Roxbury, Massachusetts, a former member of the Winter Hill Gang and ex-top echelon informant for the FBI.
- Nicholas Femia, of East Boston, an associate of the Patriarca crime family and later the Winter Hill Gang who was involved in extortion and armed robbery.
- James Martorano, contract killer and associate of the Winter Hill Gang and later the Patriarca crime family who was a close friend of Kelly.
- Robert Italiano of East Boston, a member of the Patriarca crime family,
- William N. Ierardi of Lynn, Massachusetts, a drug dealer and Patriarca crime family associate

== Targets ==
The main targets that were the intended reason for the murders were John A. Kelly and/or his business partner and friend, Vincent E. Solomonte. The victim, bar manager John A. Kelly, is not to be mistaken for DEA agent John Kelly, friend of FBI Special Agent John Connolly, or Patriarca crime family mob associate John ("Red") Kelley who were all active at the same time in the Boston underworld.

Maurice Lewis, a lifelong friend of Kelly, stated,

I always thought of him as suitable for the cast of The Wild Bunch.... He was born a little too late for the adventure he craved. He was attracted to mobsters like a moth to a candle. Early on, he found a beat that would set him apart from the rest. He started to cultivate mob contacts as a way of getting into investigative reporting back before it became fashionable. And he loved that movie image. I don’t think he ever thought of it as anything other than a movie. But it was very real, and he just kept getting in deeper and deeper.

Although he was fired over a political scandal with city hall, co-workers thought that Kelly was on the verge of making a comeback to the world of investigative journalism. According to former colleague Maurice Lewis, Kelly was scheduled to give up his job as manager of The Blackfriars Pub in two to three weeks in order to begin work as a freelance producer at WLVI-TV, Channel 56. His first pilot was scheduled to be taped on 14 July of that year. He also spoke of buying a bar or restaurant and managing it himself. While he managed Blackfriars for Solomonte, he hired Stephen Flemmi's longtime mistress Marilyn DeSilva to work at the popular discothèque as a waitress.

Kelly, as a Channel 7 investigative reporter, in a November 1976 interview, said,

I suppose my role with those people (organized-crime figures) is a dual role in a sense. I went into the relationship looking for stories. If you want a story on a gangster, go to a cop. If you want a story on a cop, go to a gangster. I went into that situation for that reason, and I suppose I came away with more.

=== Kelly's alleged criminal associations ===
Mel Bernstein, who was WNAC-TV's news director, stated that Kelly was an admirer of Edward Francis Harrington, former head of the New England Organized Crime Task Force and the United States Attorney in Boston, and says it was Harrington who first suggested to Kelly that if he really wanted to do investigative reporting he ought to develop underworld contacts. "It's true that he kind of relished those associations... but he always maintained that those relationships were there because he needed sources. I accepted that only on the basis of who he was and what his job was. Every reporter has to have his sources."

Police Commissioner Robert diGrazia informed reporters after the scandal at city hall that there was a witch hunt-type campaign to get Mayor Kevin White. His office's public relations workers were covertly leaking information on Kelly to reporters they considered cooperative. Soon after Chief diGrazia leveled his charges, The Boston Globe released an investigative article that revealed a police report indicating that John Kelly had been seen by law enforcement officials "in the company of known members of organized crime" on roughly 25 separate occasions.

When firearms and cocaine were found at the scene of the massacre, allegations and speculations of Kelly being an active member in Boston's organized crime came to light. John Kelly's friend and co-worker Maurice Lewis later commented to The Boston Phoenix that there was no evidence that Kelly had been profiting from drug deals, though he stated that at the very least Kelly was a fringe member of organized crime.

Lewis said,

He had no new car and no new clothes. He was driving a gold Cadillac Eldorado, but it was about three years old and it wasn’t his. It was Vinny's (victim Vincent E. Solomonte), and it was all beaten up. Jack never hid anything. If he were a big drug dealer, he’d let the world know. Jack ain’t gonna be wearing moccasins if he can be wearing $150 shoes. And he left home wearing moccasins that morning.

== Investigation ==
Retired corrupt FBI Special Agent Michael J. Buckley said in court that he told FBI Special Agent John Connolly that Ierardi later admitted that he had fabricated the involvement of Bulger and Flemmi in the unsolved massacre.

=== Nicholas Femia ===
Suspect Nicholas Femia was a hulking, overweight man with a cocaine addiction who wore flashy, flamboyant clothing and had a troubled relationship with James J. Bulger, with whom he had become an associate through the Winter Hill Gang in 1976. Nicholas lived with a girlfriend of Stephen Flemmi's mistress, Marilyn DeSilva, in an apartment across the street from Chandler's Restaurant, a South End restaurant co-owned by Martorano. He first began as a career criminal under the tutelage of Joseph Barboza. Nicholas was introduced into the gang to assist with extra muscle for their extortion and "protection" rackets.

When suspect Nicholas Femia began hanging around the Winter Hill Gang's current headquarters, Lancaster Foreign Motors garage, James J. Bulger wanted it established that Nicholas had nothing whatsoever to do with the massacre, although his involvement is considered highly suspect by law enforcement circles. Bulger did this to reduce any pending surveillance and subpoenas or investigations by ambitious policemen who would try to prosecute Bulger because of his association with a high profile suspected killer like Nicholas.

Soon after Nicholas joined the Winter Hill Gang, a brief notice appeared in one of FBI Special Agent John Connolly's reports clearing Nicholas of any involvement in the Blackfriar's massacre. As James J. Bulger grew older, he became more obsessed with physical fitness. James often wore tight jeans and T-shirts, and grew increasingly disgusted with Nicholas's protruding gut.

Later, after Bulger and Nicholas parted ways, Connolly put another report in Bulger's file, suggesting that Nicholas had in fact been one of the triggermen in the Blackfriars killings. Nicholas would later remain under police surveillance for an assortment of crimes until he was shot to death during the unsuccessful shakedown of an autobody shop on Condor Street, East Boston, in 1983. Femia remains one of the suspects in the massacre, but his involvement has yet been proven.

== Murder trials and outcomes ==
Suspects Robert Italiano and William N. Ierardi, two suspects who were concentrated on by authorities during the initial homicide investigation, were later tried and acquitted in court in 1978. The massacre remains unsolved. Even though the crime was never officially solved, it is documented as being connected to organized crime. The Blackfriar murders is featured on Boston.com as a "Mob Tour" attraction.

As for the individual suspects, they faced different fates:

- James J. "Whitey" Bulger – On 19 August 1999, became the 458th Ten Most Wanted fugitive listed by the FBI, wanted for racketeering under the Racketeer Influenced and Corrupt Organizations Act (RICO), 19 counts of murder, conspiracy to commit murder, extortion, conspiracy to commit extortion, money laundering, conspiracy to commit money laundering and narcotics distribution. On 22 June 2011, after sixteen years on the run, he was arrested.
- Nicholas Femia – After Nicholas and James J. Bulger parted ways, FBI Special Agent John Connolly put another report in Bulger's file, suggesting that Nicholas had in fact been one of the triggermen in the Blackfriars killings. His involvement in the Blackfriars massacre was never successfully proven and remains unsolved. Nicholas would be recognized as one of the few associates in the Winter Hill Gang that were able to part from the group and not be murdered in retribution for something foul for their actions, like Richard Castucci and Louis Litif. Femia would later be shot to death during an alleged robbery of an auto body shop in East Boston on 16 December 1983. His killer was the owner of the shop. There was a question as to whether Femia intended to actually rob the shop since the police report of the incident stated Femia was sitting next to a desk in the office of the shop when he was shot execution style. He was 43 years old at the time of his death.
- Stephen Flemmi – Starting in 1999, he turned state's evidence and gave evidence which helped lead to the arrests and convictions of Winter Hill Gang associate Kevin Weeks, former childhood friend Frank Salemme and FBI handlers John Connolly and H. Paul Rico.
- James Martorano – The brother of John Martorano, he would later align himself with the Patriarca crime family and be promoted to the rank of caporegime. In 1995 he was convicted of racketeering, extortion and conspiracy to commit murder.
- William N. Ierardi – He was convicted of drug dealing in 1987 and turned state's evidence in trial of Stephen Flemmi and others.

== Other ==
The Summer Street building in the Church Green Buildings Historic District that once held the pub now houses office space and retail stores.

== See also ==
- Miami drug war
- List of homicides in Massachusetts
- List of unsolved deaths
