= List of Armenian journalists =

This is a list of Armenian journalists, those born in Armenia and who have established citizenship or residency.

== Notable journalists ==
- Levon Ananyan
- Hambardzum Arakelian
- Mkrtich Avetisian
- Kevork Ajemian
- Nubar Alexanian
- Ben Bagdikian
- Edik Baghdasaryan
- Zori Balayan
- Zaven Biberyan
- John Roy Carlson
- Hrant Dink
- George Donikian
- John Garabedian
- Bedros Hadjian
- David Ignatius
- Armen Keteyian
- Tim Kurkjian
- Denis Kurian
- Lara Setrakian
- Janet Shamlian
- Margarita Simonyan
- Roger Tatarian
- Philip Terzian
- Matt Vasgersian
- Nelli Sargsyan
- Nonna Alexanyan
- Anoosh Chakelian
- Grigor Atanesian

== Assassinated Armenian journalists ==
- Hrant Dink

== Armenian film critics ==
- Don Askarian
- Artsvi Bakhchinyan
