= Assassination of Vietnamese-American journalists in the United States =

1981–90 series of killings in the United States

Between 1981 and 1990, five Vietnamese-American journalists were murdered for political reasons. While the ethnic press is the most dangerous for U.S. journalists, more Vietnamese journalists have been killed than journalists from any other group, including African Americans, Latinos, Chinese, or Haitians. Anti-communist organizations like the "Vietnamese Organization to Exterminate Communists and Restore the Nation" (VOECRN) claimed responsibility, but the murders were never prosecuted.

== Background ==
The first Vietnamese journalist attacked in the United States survived. In January 1980, the Vietnamese-language magazine office of Van Nghe Tien Phong located in Arlington County, Virginia, was set fire by an explosion but publisher Nguyen Thanh Hoang lived. In 1990, when the last of five journalists was killed, the victim also worked for Van Nghe Tien Phong and the publication reported that victim Triet Le was one of 10 of its staff attacked by gunfire inside of one year. After the assassinations of the five and violence that affected other intellectuals, and not only journalists, police in the crime areas had no evidence to pin the murders on any person other than claims made by a group calling itself Vietnamese Party to Exterminate the Communists and Restore the Nation, or VOECRN.

Despite the implied targets in the organization's name, the opinions of victims ranged across the spectrum. In a documentary by PBS's Frontline and ProPublica, "Terror in Little Saigon", the National United Front for the Liberation of Vietnam's assassination arm, known as K-9, was connected to the five deaths.

== List of Vietnamese journalists ==
Date	Name	Employer	Location	Notes	Ref.
22 September 1990	Triet Le	Van Nghe Tien Phong	Bailey's Crossroads, Virginia	A columnist of controversial content for the same Vietnamese magazine that employed Nhan Trong Do. Assassinated.	
22 November 1989	Nhan Trong Do	Van Nghe Tien Phong	Fairfax County, Virginia	A layout designer who worked with Triet Le, he was the first employer of the Vietnamese-language magazine to be assassinated.	
9 August 1987	Tap Van Pham (a.k.a. Hoai Diep Tu)	Mai	Garden Grove, California	He was assassinated by arson while sleeping in his office by an anti-communist group that took responsibility.	
24 August 1982	Nguyen Dam Phong	Tu Do (Freedom)	Houston, Texas	Was assassinated at his home by an anti-communist group.	
21 July 1981	Duong Trong Lam	Cai Dinh Lang (The Village Temple)	San Francisco, California	Killed by gunfire from a member of one of two anti-communist groups taking credit for his assassination.	

== Deaths ==
US Vietnamese journalists were killed in these locations in United States shown in relation to the national capital in Washington, D.C. The two locations in Northern Virginia are nearby, in Fairfax County, Virginia.

Five Vietnamese journalists were assassinated in the U.S. between 1981 and 1990, and their journalism and the controversial political issues they were writing about played a role. Vietnamese political organizations had formed throughout the country and some of these targeted the Vietnamese journalists.

=== Duong Trong Lam ===
The first of five Vietnamese journalists to be murdered, Duong Trong Lam was shot by an assassin July 21, 1981. He was known as a "left-wing" publisher of Cai Dinh Lang (Translated: The Village Temple), a Vietnamese-language newspaper published in San Francisco, California, and for his criticism of the Vietnam War. A group called Vietnamese Organization to Exterminate Communists and Restore the Nation (VOECRN), which is one of two anti-communism organizations that was known to commit violence, claimed responsibility. His publication of left-wing content was the motive.

Duong Trong Lam was briefly buried at the Los Gatos Memorial Park, in San Jose, but his remains were removed by his father after anti-communist protests by the local Vietnamese community.

=== Nguyen Dam Phong ===
The second murder of a Vietnamese journalist in the United States occurred almost one year after the first incident. Nguyen Dam Phong founded Tu Do (Translated: Freedom) in 1981, which was published from his home in Houston, Texas. After arriving in the U.S., he worked as a factory worker making terrariums and then as a dental technician but was motivated to start his own newspaper as a passion. Phong began receiving threats because the content of his newspaper was critical of right-wing exile groups. He was assassinated on August 24, 1982, at his home, and the VOECRN again claimed responsibility.

=== Tap Van Pham ===
The third murder was five years later. This time, the VOECRN attacked Tap Van Pham (a.k.a. Hoai Diep Tu) in Garden Grove, California. He did editorial work and advertisements for Mai and other Canadian companies to promote cash transfers and travel services to Vietnam. He was asleep in his office on the morning of 9 August 1987 when it burst into flames and he died afterward from smoke inhalation. Police investigators said the fire was an arson and the VOECRN had doused the office in gasoline and lit it on fire. From this case, police concluded from undisclosed evidence the VOECRN group was connected to other crimes but the Federal Bureau of Investigation refused to become involved in the investigation.

=== Nhan Trong Do ===
The fourth journalist assassinated came two years later, when Nhen Trong Do was shot dead in his car in Fairfax County, Virginia. In this case, there were no suspects in the killing. He was a layout designer for Van Nghe Tien Phong.

=== Triet Le ===
The last of five Vietnamese journalists to be assassinated was Triet Le, 61, who lived in Bailey's Crossroads, Virginia. He was also employed by Van Nghe Tien Phong, where he was a columnist known for his controversial opinions against communists and the Vietnamese government. He was assassinated 22 September 1990. The VOECRN had Triet Le on its hit list since 1982 from evidence found in Nguyen Dam Phong's home. The organization carried out the murder while Triet Le was parking his car in front of his home. The attacker also killed his wife, an innocent bystander, by gunfire.

== Impact ==
The assassination of Vietnamese journalists in the United States was motivated by the political opinions of the writers and their publications, and this motive increased the fear in the Vietnamese-American community about the free expression of ideas and opinions. After one of the murders, Giang Huu Tuyen, the publisher of Viet Bao, said, "I worry that one day somebody will come into my office and say to me, 'I don't like your paper.' Then, 'Bang!' It's a risky business. People are very emotional over all that has happened."

== See also ==
- List of journalists killed in the United States
