= List of journalists killed in South Sudan =

Places in South Sudan where journalists were killed. A gold pin marks the location of murders. A red pin stands for overlaps. Gudele is a suburb of Juba, the pins overlap.

South Sudan, located in northeast Africa, has seen the number of slayings of journalists jump since the start of the South Sudanese Civil War in 2013. The number of journalists killed in 2015 jumped to seven, the most in a single year in South Sudan's history. After President Salva Kiir made threatening comments about journalists, journalist Peter Julius Moi was killed, and press freedom groups responded critically to his statements. Reporters Without Borders, a group that monitors the safety and rights of journalists worldwide, ranked South Sudan as 125th for press freedom out of a possible 180 nations. No one has been charged with any of the killings.

== Reporters killed in South Sudan ==
Date	Name	Employer	Location (South Sudan)	Notes	Refs
5 December 2012	Isaiah Diing Abraham Chan Awuol	Sudan Tribune	Gudele	Former major in the Sudan People's Liberation Army turned journalist who was murdered in front of his home	
25 January 2015	Musa Mohammed	South Sudan Radio Wau	Western Bahr el Ghazal	Killed together by gunman in a single attack	
25 January 2015	Boutros Martin	South Sudan Television	Western Bahr el Ghazal	Killed together by gunman in a single attack	
25 January 2015	Dalia Marko	Raja Radio Station	Western Bahr el Ghazal	Killed together by gunman in a single attack	
25 January 2015	Randa George	Raja Radio Station	Western Bahr el Ghazal	Killed together by gunman in a single attack	
25 January 2015	Adam Juma	Raja Radio Station	Western Bahr el Ghazal	Killed together by gunman in a single attack	
20 May 2015	Pow James Raeth	Radio Tamazuj	Akobo	Journalist caught in gunfire between warring groups after leaving a NGO	
15 August 2015	Clement Lochio Lomornana	Gurtong Media	Chukudum, Budi County	Forcibly disappeared from his home; widely believed to have been killed	
19 August 2015	Peter Julius Moi	South Sudan Corporate Weekly	Juba	Journalist killed days after president Salva Kiir threatened journalists in South Sudan	
11 July 2016	John Gatluak Manguet	The Radio Community Internews South Sudan	Juba	Journalist killed by government forces in Terrain Hotel during the outbreak of violence in Juba between forces loyal to former First Vice President Dr. Riek Machar and forces loyal to President Salva Kiir.	

== Context ==
The killings of journalists in the world's youngest nation escalated after the start of the civil war in 2013. The civil war broke out after President Kiir and former Vice President Riek Machar began a power struggle that resulted in a division within the military based on ethnicity.

The mass murder of journalists Musa Mohammed, Boutros Martin, Dalia Marko, Randa George, and Adam Juma along with local officials who were traveling with them took place in a single, violent attack on 25 January 2015. The journalists were traveling through the Western Bahr el Ghazal region of South Sudan when their convoy was assaulted by unknown gunmen. Six others were killed in the attack.

The death of reporter Power James Raeth happened under similar circumstances as he was caught in the crossfire between two rival groups in the city of Akobo. The groups were listed as rival factions however suspicion of government intervention still hangs heavily over the entire case. A university student was also killed in the same attack.

The most suspicious case was that of Peter Julius Moi who was killed only days after South Sudan president Salva Kiir made an intimidating statement directed at journalists. He was quoted as saying "If anybody among them (journalists) does not know that this country has killed people, we will demonstrate it one day, one time." The killing of Mr. Moi occurred shortly afterward. Oliver Modi, who currently serves as chairman of the Union of Journalists of South Africa, was quoted as saying "This was an intentional killing" which has only added speculation to the case.

== Reactions ==
=== Isaiah Diing Abraham Chan Awol ===
“I condemn the assassination of Isaiah Diing Abraham Chan Awol and call on the South Sudan authorities to respect the fundamental right of freedom of expression which is enshrined in the Universal Declaration of Human Rights. Bringing the murderers of Isaiah Diing Abraham Chan Awol to justice is an essential step in the young country’s construction as a lawful democracy.” - Irina Bokova, director-general of UNESCO

=== Five journalists ===
In its reaction, UNESCO noted that two out of the five journalists killed on 25 January 2015 in Western Bahr el Ghazal State of South Sudan were women.

"These deaths are a blow to freedom of information and freedom of expression and I call on the authorities to do all in their power to ensure that these essential rights are protected and that journalists can carry out their work in safe conditions." - Irina Bokova, director-general of UNESCO

=== Power James Raeth ===
"“We condemn the senseless killing of Pow James Raeth, somebody who was working for peace and for educating and informing the public." - Hildebrand Bijleveld, director of Radio Tamazuj where Raeth was a freelancer.

=== Peter Julius Moi ===
"We condemn the senseless killing of Peter Julius Moi in what has become a deadly year for journalists in South Sudan. More and more independent voices are being silenced in South Sudan at this critical time in the country's history, when the public desperately needs impartial information."- Tom Rhodes, CPJ's East Africa representative

"Today it is Peter, tomorrow is someone else. We are being taken one by one." - Oliver Modi, chairman of the Union of Journalists of South Sudan

"I got personally shocked and am still struggling to recover from the trauma of seeing his dead body lying on the dirt that fateful day. I am not sure how many journalists will go into hiding since this incident, but for now the work spirit among journalists is that of a scared, disillusioned press." - a friend and colleague of Moi's told CPJ.

== Impact ==
The killings of seven journalists within the span of a year has spurred some media outlets to stop reporting on government actions and has caused others to go so far as to stop reporting entirely. Nhial Bol Aken, editor and chief of the independent "The Citizen newspaper" has quit journalism citing threats from the government and safety concerns. A nationwide, self-imposed media blackout also took place after the killing of Peter Moi that lasted from 8/21/15 through 11AM on 8/22/15.

== See also ==
- Human rights in South Sudan
- South Sudanese Civil War
