= Gudele West =

Gudele West is a community of returnees from the Second Sudanese Civil War on the edge of Juba, Central Equatoria, South Sudan. In 2005, Gudele West was home to about 500 families. In late 2010, there were 4,000, at which time there was no electricity, no water and no sewer, and housing consisted of mud huts with iron roofs. The community grew as tens of thousands of people migrated to South Sudan in anticipation of its independence from Sudan.
