= Valentin Areh =

Slovenian journalist

Valentin Areh (born August 22, 1971) is a Slovenian journalist, war correspondent and writer. Currently he works for several international media organisations.

Born in the Slovenian capital Ljubljana, he participated in 1991 as a soldier in the brief Slovenian war of independence. He subsequently attended Ljubljana University, studying history and sociology. He concluded his studies at Ljubljana by obtaining a Master's degree covering certain sociological aspects of the US electoral system.

Areh has 33 years of experience as a war correspondent in places such as Croatia, Bosnia, Kosovo, Chechnya, Afghanistan, Iraq and Ukraine. He was one of the few journalists to remain in Kosovo during the Kosovo War of 1999 and he survived a tortuous escape out of the country during NATO’s war to expel Serbian forces. He has worked with AP, Reuters, Italia Uno, Media set, 24ur and he is the author of several books.

== Bibliography ==
Areh has written several books, including:

- Afghanistan: Stories of War Correspondent (2002);
- Saddam Hussein al Tikriti (2004);
- Blood in the Desert Sand (2004).
