= WLQY =

Radio station in Hollywood, Florida

- Hollywood, Florida; United States
- Broadcast area: Greater Miami
- Frequency: 1320 kHz
- Branding: WLQY 1320 am

Programming
- Format: Haitian Creole

Ownership
- Owner: Entravision Communications; (Entravision Holdings, LLC)

History
- First air date: August 7, 1953
- Former call signs: WHWD (1953–1954); WGMA (1954–1980); WADY (1980)
- Call sign meaning: "Lucky"

Technical information
- Licensing authority: FCC
- Facility ID: 23609
- Class: B
- Power: 5,000 watts
- Transmitter coordinates: 26°1′53.00″N 80°16′42.00″W

Links
- Public license information: Public file; LMS
- Website: WLQYradio.com

WLQY (1320 kHz) is a commercial AM radio station licensed to Hollywood, Florida, and serving Greater Miami. The station has a Haitian Creole music and information radio format and is owned by Entravision Holdings, LLC. The studios and offices are on NE 125th Street in North Miami.

== Technical ==
WLQY broadcasts with 5,000 watts, using a directional antenna at all times. By day it employs a two-tower array and at night a four-tower array is used. The transmitter is off Sheridan Street in Hollywood.

== History ==
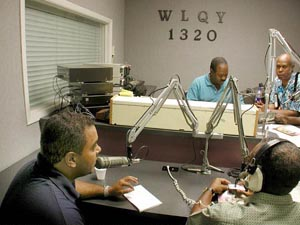
A talk show in progress at WLQY studios

The station signed-on the air as WHWD on August 7, 1953.

"The Million Dollar Sound of WGMA" began in the mid-1960s as a middle of the road station. It was a daytimer, required to go off the air at night, and broadcast with only 1,000 watts. Artists included Frank Sinatra, Nat King Cole, Barbra Streisand and Dean Martin.

It later switched to country music as WGMA "The Country Giant." The power was boosted to 5,000 watts around the clock, using a four-tower directional pattern, day and night. See History of WGMA The Country Giant, 1967-79 WGMA was located at the Hollywood Federal building on Washington Street and 441, and the transmitter was at 9881 Sheridan Street.

Singles-only station WADY "The Lady", went on the air on March 1, 1980. On July 1, 1980, the station changed its call sign to the current WLQY.

WLQY, first known as "Lucky 13", used the syndicated "Music Of Your Life" adult standards format.
