= Mary Bruce (disambiguation) =

Mary Bruce (c.1282–1323) was the sister of Robert the Bruce, King of Scots.

Mary Bruce may also refer to:

- Mary Bruce, Countess of Elgin (1778–1855), first wife of British diplomat Thomas Bruce, 7th Earl of Elgin
- Mary Grant Bruce (1878–1958), Australian children's author and journalist
- Mary Louisa Bruce, Countess of Elgin (1819–1898)
- Mary Bruce (journalist) American TV journalist for ABC News
