= Susan Gregg Gilmore =

American novelist

- Born: 1961 (age 64–65); Nashville, Tennessee, U.S.
- Education: National Cathedral School; University of Virginia; University of Texas at Austin
- Occupation: Novelist

Susan Gregg Gilmore (born 1961) is an American novelist specializing in Southern fiction. Her first book, Looking for Salvation at the Dairy Queen, was called a "stand-out coming-of-age novel" by NPR critic Alan Cheese. Her most recent novel, The Funeral Dress, was described as a "revelatory novel that offers an evocative account of the lives of Appalachian working women" by Kirkus Reviews.

Gilmore lives in Chattanooga, Tennessee, with her husband and dog.

== Early life and education ==
The youngest of four children, Gilmore was born in 1961 in Nashville, Tennessee. During her high-school years, her parents moved to Washington, D.C., where she attended National Cathedral School. She studied history at the University of Virginia, serving as a reporter for The Cavalier Daily. Following graduation, she worked as a secretary at the Smithsonian Institution. She earned her master's degree in American studies from the University of Texas at Austin.

She married her husband in 1985; they raised three daughters together.

== Career ==
Following a stint as staff writer for the Chattanooga News Free Press, Gilmore relocated to Pasadena, California, freelancing for such periodicals as The Los Angeles Times, The Christian Science Monitor, Parenting, and Garden & Gun. Her essay, "An L.A. Beagle," appeared in Good Dog: True Stories of Love, Loss, and Loyalty (2014). Her first novel, Looking for Salvation at the Dairy Queen, was published in 2008, followed by The Improper Life of Bezellia Grove (2010) and The Funeral Dress (2013). Gilmore is currently working on her fourth novel, also set in her native Tennessee.
