= Naomi Iizuka =

American dramatist (born 1965)

- Born: April 22, 1965 (age 61); Tokyo, Japan
- Education: Yale University (BA); University of California, San Diego (MFA)

Naomi Iizuka (born April 22, 1965) is a Japanese-born American playwright. Iizuka's works often have a non-linear storyline and are influenced by her multicultural background.

== Early life and education ==
Naomi Iizuka was born in Tokyo, April 22, 1965. Her mother is an American Latina attorney and her father is a Japanese banker. Iizuka grew up in Japan, Indonesia, the Netherlands and Washington, D.C.

Iizuka attended the National Cathedral School, has her bachelor's degree in classical literature from Yale University in 1987 and spent one year at Yale Law School before eventually receiving her MFA in playwriting from University of California, San Diego in 1992.

== Career ==
She has taught playwriting at the University of Iowa and the University of Texas, Austin and was a Professor of Dramatic Arts and Director of the Playwriting Program at UC Santa Barbara until January 2008 when she took over as the head of MFA playwrighting at her alma mater, University of California, San Diego.

Iizuka was commissioned to write Good Kids, as the first playwright to participate in the Big Ten Theatre Consortium's New Play Initiative, which was established to commission, produce and publicize a series of new plays by female playwrights, each of which will contain several significant roles for college-aged women.

== Commissioning ==
The Encyclopedia of Asian-American Literature cites Iizuka as 'One of the most commissioned playwrights in contemporary American theater.' Iizuka approaches commissioning through prevalent social issues. She says the university is a particularly good pathway to develop her commissioned work because of the resources and diversity they can offer: 'I believe universities are the great untapped resource in American theatre. In terms of material resources: performance spaces, rehearsal rooms, shops and state-of-the-art equipment. Also, in terms of human resources and the communities you find within universities. If we want to develop artist-driven work that's keyed into the artist's process, that's not a one-size-fits-all process, universities can be a big part in solving that puzzle.'

Iizuka was commissioned to write Good Kids by the Big Ten Theatre Consortium. The initiative is meant to support women playwrights and increase the number of roles for women on stage. Iizuka says, 'I wanted to write a play that spoke to issues that were very important to university students right now. Having taught at a number of schools as a guest artist, and now teaching at University of California–San Diego, it seems like the issue of sexual assault—and more importantly, the attitudes and misconceptions that create a climate where sexual assault is prevalent—seemed timely.' As part of the Big Ten initiative, universities are performing Good Kids to tackle the issue of sexual assault on campus. Good Kids is about a drunk high school girl who is raped by a group of football players after a high school party. The play focuses on the rumors and social aftermath. The natural question arises: who is to blame? 'I think the question that the play asks is how can this happen?" Iizuka says. 'If we take it as a starting point that college campuses are not filled with sociopathic predators: What is it that creates a situation where this happens?' Through the process of creating Good Kids, Izuka collaborated with college students and solicited their input toward the issue of sexual assault and how campuses should prevent and respond to this crime. 'It's something that they very much want to talk about, and do something about,' she says. 'There's an enormous energy around the issue of sexual assault and what to do on campus. You don't solve a problem like sexual assault with anything other than a deep shift in attitude, and a deep shift in attitude happens conversation by conversation, in dorm rooms, parties and rehearsal halls.'

Good Kids was produced at the University of Michigan (October 2–12, 2014), University of Iowa (February 8–15, 2015), Indiana University (February 6–14, 2015), University of Wisconsin–Madison (February 27-March 8, 2015), University of Maryland (February 27-March 7, 2015), Purdue University (April 10–12, 15-18, 22-26, 2015), Penn State University, Ohio State University (October 27, 2014), and has scheduled productions at many other schools outside the Big Ten.

== Content and critical response ==
Iizuka's background in classical literature inspires her 'fusing of classical styles and forms to modern and contemporary voices.' Evident in her adaptation of Hamlet Hamlet: Blood on the Brain (2006), Johns Hopkins University Press describes her work as reinforcing 'a sense that the play's archetypal quality could be adapted to fit a society lacking resonance with either ancient Scandinavia or Elizabethan London….non-academic spectators could accept that classics illuminate modern society.' Set in Oakland in the 1980s, the play is about a young man who gets out of prison to find his father murdered and his uncle in charge of his mother's house. Through the History of Oakland, California, the play explores the theme of anger and violence in contemporary time, drawing strong parallels to Shakespeare's Hamlet.

Iizuka's Polaroid Stories (1997) is a modern adaptation of the Greek myth of Eurydice and Orpheus. Iizuka collapses classical literature and contemporary everyday life by making Minneapolis street kids the main characters of the play instead of mythical gods. The drug dealers, prostitutes, and homeless tell their stories, some real and some complete lies, which together create some sort of truth about the desolate, urban landscape that they find refuge in. Iizuka's work shows that no matter the time period, there is great power in storytelling.

Iizuka contemplates what is real and what is authentic in her 2001 play 36 Views. The title refers to nineteenth-century Japanese artist Hokusai's Thirty-six Views of Mount Fuji. Some of the 36 scenes are set in contemporary America while others are set in Japan several hundred years ago. A New York Times critic notes, 'among Ms. Iizuka's well-demonstrated ideas is that human wishes persistently obscure the truth. All by ourselves we make it tougher to know what's what.' The play is about the unexpected discovery of an 11th-century Japanese pillow book and the struggle to construct reality in the midst of the uncertainty surrounding the book's origin and authenticity. Darius Wheeler and his assistant John Bell come across revelations that conflict with their previous assumptions throughout the play and up to the very end where 'not even the context of the plot is what it seems to be.'

== Personal life ==
She has lived in Iowa and currently lives in Los Angeles, California.

== Plays ==
- At the Vanishing Point (2004) Revised in 2015
- Good Kids (2014)
- The Last Firefly (2011)
- Concerning Strange Devices from the Distant West (2010)
- Ghostwritten (2009)
- After a Hundred Years (2008)
- Anon(ymous) (2006)
- Hamlet: Blood in the Brain (2006)
- Strike-Slip (2006)
- 17 Reasons (Why) (2003)
- War of the Worlds (Written in collaboration with Anne Bogart) (2000)
- Language of Angels (2000)
- 36 Views (2000)
- Aloha, Say the Pretty Girls (1999)
- Polaroid Stories (1997)
- Marlowe's Eye (1996)
- Skin (1995)
- Tattoo Girl (1994)
- Carthage (1994)
- Coxinga (1994)
- Ikeniye (1994)
- Crazy Jane (1992)
- Portrait of Bianca (1992)
- Greenland (1992)
- Lizzy Vinyl (1990)
- And Then She Was Screaming (1990)
- Body Beautiful (1990)

== Awards ==
- 1995 Jerome Fellowship
- 1996 McKnight Advancement Grant
- 1998 PEN Center USA West Award for Drama
- 1998 Princeton University's Hodder Fellowship
- 1999 Whiting Award
- 2001 NEA/TCG Artist-in-Residence Grant
- 2001 Stavis Award from the National Theatre Conference
- 2001 Rockefeller Foundation MAP grant
- 2004 Joyce Award
- 2005 Alpert Award in the Arts
- 2007 PEN/Laura Pels International Foundation for Theater Award winner for a playwright in mid-career
- 2011 Joyce Award
- 2024-2025 Hermitage Award
