= Margaret Hicks Williams =

American government official (1899–1972)

- Born: Margaret de Forest Hicks; June 30, 1899; Pittsfield, Massachusetts, U.S.
- Died: August 18, 1972 (aged 73); Suburban Hospital, Bethesda, Maryland, U.S.
- Resting place: Chatham, New Jersey
- Education: National Cathedral School; Columbia University; George Washington University
- Occupations: government official; writer; political expert
- Employers: Military Intelligence Division, U.S. Department of War; U.S. State Department
- Organization(s): President, Washington, D.C. Women's Commission on Crime Prevention
- Spouse: James Bradley Williams (div.)
- Awards: Meritorious Service Award from the State Department; Professional Woman of the Year, District Chapter, National Federation of Business and Profession Women's Clubs

Margaret Hicks Williams (née Hicks; 1899–1972) was an American author and specialist in international affairs. A government official, she worked as a writer and political expert in the Military Intelligence Division, U.S. Department of War, before joining the U.S. State Department in 1944, serving in various roles. Williams was president of the Washington, D.C. Women's Commission on Crime Prevention.

== Early life and education ==
Margaret de Forest Hicks was born in Pittsfield, Massachusetts, on June 30, 1899. Her parents were William Cleveland and Margaret (Hughes) Hicks.

Williams was educated with a governess until she entered the National Cathedral School, Washington, D.C., graduating in 1918. She attended Columbia University and George Washington University.

== Career ==
She was the only woman officially detailed to represent the War Department at the Institute of Politics, Williamstown, Massachusetts. She attended the 1921, 1922, and 1923 sessions in this capacity, participating in round-table discussions on international politics, particularly concerning the Orient. In 1944, she joined the State Department, serving as cultural attache in Tokyo (1952) and Manila (1952–1956).

In the summer of 1924, Williams took a semi-official trip through central and southeastern Europe, including the Balkans and Turkey, making unofficial survey of conditions and interviewing heads of governments for purpose of gathering material for writing. Since 1923, she was a special feature writer for The New York Times and contributed to many magazines, including Current History, The International Interpreter (later consolidated with The Outlook), Aero Digest, The Century Magazine, and others. She co-authored The American Year Book, 1925, and was the author of "Nations Gather to Assist China" (The New York Times, October 25, 1925); "Head of Bulgaria's Disordered House" (Washington Star, April 26, 1925); "Williamstown" (International Interpreter, September 8, 1923); "Japan's Envoy of Good Will" (The New York Times, January 4, 1925); "Scholar President Puts Austria Back on Her Feet" (The New York Times, December 21, 1924); "China in Anti-Foreign Mood" (Current History, July 1925); "America's Opportunity in Siberia" (Current History, December 1923); "Is Japan Overpopulated?" (Current History, September 1923); "Measuring the Heat of the Stars" (The New York Times, January 20, 1924); "New Forces in Old Japan" (Century, April 1926), and other works.

Williams was the president of the Washington, D.C. Women's Commission on Crime Prevention. She was a member of the National League of American Pen Women, National Women's Press Club, Junior League, and St. John's Episcopal Church.

== Personal life ==
She was a resident of New York City and Cumberland, Maryland, before removing to Washington, D.C..

A bibliophile, her hobby was book collecting.

She and her husband, James Bradley Williams, were divorced in the 1940s.

Margaret Hicks Williams died at Suburban Hospital, Bethesda, Maryland, on August 18, 1972; interment was in Chatham, New Jersey.

== Awards and honors ==
- 1968, Meritorious Service Award from the State Department
- 1968, Professional Woman of the Year, District Chapter, National Federation of Business and Profession Women's Clubs

== Selected works ==
=== Co-author ===
- The American Year Book, 1925
- To Live in Amity - The Story of the U.S. State Department

=== Articles ===
- "After the Earthquake in Japan" (Current History, December 1923) (text)
- "America's Opportunity in Siberia" (Current History, December 1923)
- "A New Era in Japanese Diplomacy" (The International Interpreter, December 22, 1923) (text)
- "China in Anti-Foreign Mood" (Current History, July 1925)
- "Constantinople Settings and Traits" (The Atlantic, February 1, 1927)
- "Head of Bulgaria's Disordered House" (Washington Star, April 26, 1925)
- "Is Japan Overpopulated?" (Current History, September 1923)
- "Japan's Envoy of Good Will" (The New York Times, January 4, 1925)
- "Japan and Russia in the East: Stunted Seeds of a Second Russo-Japanese War" ("The Virginia Quarterly Review", January 1927) (text)
- "Measuring the Heat of the Stars" (The New York Times, January 20, 1924)
- "Nations Gather to Assist China" (The New York Times, October 25, 1925)
- "New Forces in Old Japan" (Century, April 1926) (text)
- "Scholar President Puts Austria Back on Her Feet" (The New York Times, December 21, 1924)
- "Williamstown" (The International Interpreter, September 8, 1923)
