= Karen C. Fox =

American science writer

- Born: Washington, DC, US
- Occupation: Writer
- Writing career
- Period: 1992–present
- Genres: Astronomy, physics, history of physics and astronomy, travel
- Website: www.karenceliafox.com

Karen C. Fox is an American science writer specializing in physics, astronomy, and the history of science for adults and children.

== Biography ==
In addition to her science writing, Fox was a relationship columnist for America Online, Oxygen, and Dating911 from 1997 to 2001. Writing under the moniker "The Dating Diva," she was known for making metaphorical parallels between quantum physics and modern romance. She is also a published travel writer.

Fox is a 1987 graduate of the National Cathedral School. She majored in physics and English at Amherst College and studied science communication as a graduate student at University of California, Santa Cruz. She is the daughter of Patricia Smith, founder of the nonprofit women's organization Peace X Peace and co-founder of the Melton Foundation.

== Selected works ==
=== Books ===
- The Chain Reaction: Pioneers of Nuclear Science, 1998
- The Big Bang: What It Is, Where It Came From and Why It Works, 2002
- Einstein A to Z, 2004 (with Aries Keck)
- The Absolute Zero Community Education Outreach Guide , 2006
- Moon Metro Washington D.C., 2007 (contributor)
- Older Than the Stars, 2010

=== Magazine articles ===
- "Condensed matter physics: Some like it cold", Nature, 2005
- "Einstein's Leap of Faith", Science & Spirit Magazine, 2005
- "The Subtle Art of the Suburban Page Turner", Amherst Magazine, 2005
- "The Physics of Swimming", Discover, 2006
- "Brave Neutron World", Popular Mechanics, 2006
- "At Last, the Lab-Grown Organ", Popular Mechanics, 2006
- "Open Ocean Lab FLIP Vessel: How it Works", Popular Mechanics, 2007
- "More than just a pretty bow: The physics of curly ribbon", USA Weekend, 2007
- "A Year of Big Advances", USA Weekend, 2008
- "All that glitters – cleans", USA Weekend, 2008
- "Faster Optical Switching", MIT Technology Review, 2008
- "How to Build a Dobsonian Telescope", Popular Mechanics, 2008

=== Radio ===
- Science Report Radio, 1994–1998 (writer and producer)

=== Web projects ===
- Transistorized!, 2001 (writer)
- Florence Kahn: Congressional Widow to Trailblazing Lawmaker, 2009 (narrator)
