= Amanda Cassatt =

American journalist and entrepreneur (born 1991)

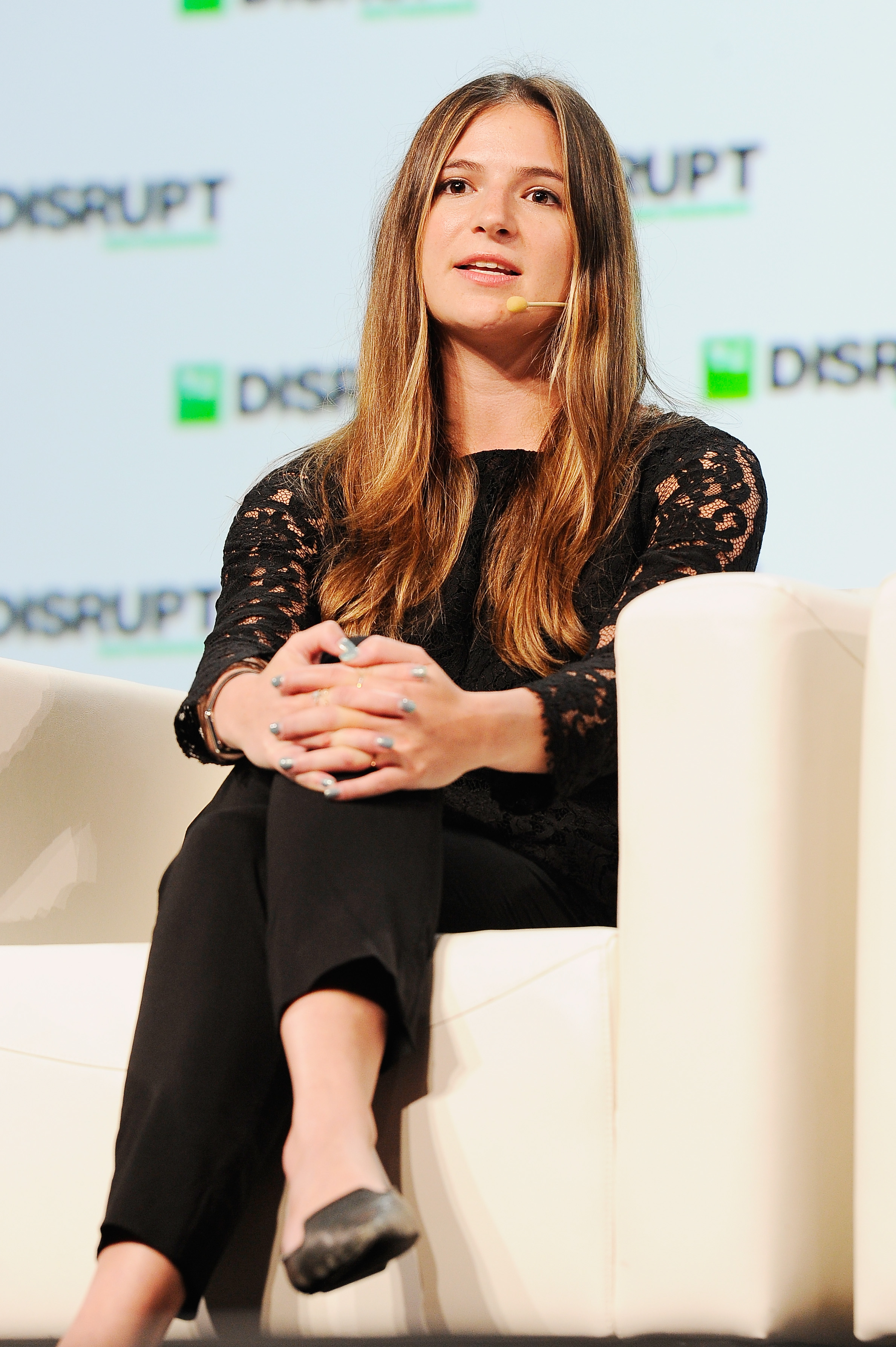
- Born: Amanda Claire Gutterman; March 12, 1991 (age 35); Washington, D.C., U.S.
- Education: Columbia University (BA)
- Occupations: Entrepreneur; marketing executive; author
- Spouse: Samuel Lee Cassatt (m. 2019)

Amanda Claire Cassatt (née Gutterman; born March 12, 1991) is an American entrepreneur, marketing executive, and author. She was the chief marketing officer at ConsenSys from 2016 to July 2019. Cassatt is the founder and CEO of Serotonin, a Web3 services company.

== Early life and education ==
Cassatt was born in 1991, in Washington, D.C., to Deborah Gutterman, a neuroscientist at the National Institutes of Health, and Peter Gutterman, a computer scientist at The World Bank in Washington, D.C.

She attended the National Cathedral School. She then studied English at Columbia University and graduated magna cum laude in 2013.

== Career ==
Beginning in 2013, Cassat worked as the special projects editor for HuffPost and worked directly with HuffPost's editor-in-chief, Arianna Huffington, to cover topics of unique interest. In addition to her editorial duties, Cassatt wrote articles for HuffPost, reporting on a variety of issues.

In March 2015, Cassatt co-founded Slant, a publishing platform and media outlet. Slant's business model paid contributing writers a flat fee plus a majority percentage of the advertising revenue generated from articles published on the platform. In addition to being the company's co-founder, Cassatt also was its editorial director.

In 2016, Cassatt became chief marketing officer at ConsenSys, the Ethereum blockchain software technology company founded by Joseph Lubin. In September 2018, Cassatt spoke at TechCrunch Disrupt in San Francisco about blockchain technology, along with Lubin. She stepped down as chief marketing officer of ConsenSys in 2019.

In 2020, Cassatt subsequently founded Serotonin, a Web3 marketing agency and product studio for cryptocurrency companies. She is CEO of Serotonin. She also is president of Mojito, an NFT-based commerce platform incubated by Serotonin.

Cassatt published a book in 2023 titled, Web3 Marketing, as a nontechnical overview of the concepts surrounding Web3.

Cassatt was recognized on Forbes's 30 under 30 list and Inc.'s 30 under 30 list in 2020.

== Personal life ==
Cassatt married Samuel Cassatt on July 20, 2019, in St. Helena, California.
