= Language of Angels =

- Original language: English
- Written by: Naomi Iizuka
- Characters: Celie; Seth; JB; Michael; Kendra; Billy; Danielle; Voices
- Genre: Drama
- Setting: A cave in rural North Carolina; a parking lot; Danielle's home; 1987, Present

Premiere
- Date: 2000
- Place: San Francisco, California

Language of Angels is a drama play written by Naomi Iizuka, first produced in San Francisco (2000), and by City College of San Francisco (November 2010).

Language of Angels begins in a cave on the edge of a rural North Carolina town, where a young girl once went missing. One of nine friends is responsible for her death, yet her ghostly, echoed cries will haunt each of them forever. Iizuka weaves together the parallel paths each friend takes that lead to their own tragic fates. Her ghost story morphs into a multi-layered musing on grief, loss, guilt and karma, and the elusive truth behind missing girl's life and death reveals itself one piece at a time. "Because Iizuka set the structure of Japanese Noh drama, with its ghostly presences and shifting time, against the rural landscape of North Carolina, we likewise juxtapose elements of Japanese drama with clearly drawn characters from a mountain village in the South,". "What surfaces is a beautifully poetic Appalachian voice – a familiar voice of hardship, despair and grief elegantly spun into a centuries-old dramatic structure."

Hidden beneath the scary, mysterious exterior, Language of Angels is ultimately a touching and deeply heartfelt play. As the surviving friends come to terms with their own mortality, they must also face the truth about their childhood and the regret and guilt their mistakes have caused them.

== Characters ==
- Celie
- Seth
- JB
- Billy
- Allison
- Danielle
- Kendra
- Michael
- Voices (of Mother and Daughter)

== Plot ==
=== Part I ===
Language of Angels opens with an interview style description of that night from Kendra, Seth and JB. They are not aware of the others on stage and tell their bit straight to the audience. They describe a night when all 10 of the characters went into the caves and got drunk. When they awoke the next morning Celie was gone.

We see graffiti from that night illuminated on the wall (JB loves Joline - Tommy loves Danielle - Sean loves Kendra - Billy loves Allison - Seth loves Celie. 4ever and ever.) We get conflicting descriptions of Celie's character- JB calls her wild and dangerous while Seth (her boyfriend at the time) thinks of her as angelic and gentle. As they tell their stories, Celie, as a ghost appears, acting out the storyteller's scenario.

Seth goes on to say how almost everyone who was in the cave last night has died young. He and Kendra also talk about how people believe her spirit still walks the hills and the caves- they believe they hear her singing. Seth and Kendra both admit to feeling haunted by Celie's spirit, while JB seems to have left that night deep in the recesses of his mind.

Celie appears, as a ghost, and tells that JB was her murderer. She tells how far in the future JB will die and his daughter will find him. She says his daughter will discover his back is covered in burning messages, the most clear of the messages reading, "Remember me 4ever and ever". Celie says his daughter would never tell a soul. With that, Celie reaches out and JB feels a burning in his back across the stage.

=== Part II ===
Part II opens on Allison and Danielle, two friends of Celie's who were in the cave that night. They are both strippers, and in the previous scene, Seth indicated that they are on drugs. In this scene, they are meeting a stranger named Michael. Danielle is not interested in Michael until she realizes that he resembles her late fiancé Tommy (who was in the cave that night.) Suddenly there is a time warp and Michael is Tommy, caressing her face telling her that death is not so bad. There is a moment of love between them, when suddenly we return to present time and Michael is coming on to Danielle, which she rejects completely. Allison continues to talk to Michael, and describes how she, Danielle and Celie were all very close, how they used to sing in harmony together. Danielle tries to hush Allison but she seems lost in memory, unaware, and continues to reminisce.

Danielle sings suddenly, Michael is Tommy again, and Tommy lovingly tells Danielle not to be so sad. Billy enters, a rude drunk now, and Danielle introduces him to Michael. Allison says what everyone is thinking: that Michael resembles Tommy. Immediately, Billy and Danielle start to argue about Tommy. Billy and Tommy were best friends while Danielle and Tommy were engaged; they argue about who knew him better and Billy begins to tell about the night Tommy died. They start to yell at each other. Then Billy takes out his gun and fires at Michael, which immediately sends us into a time warp to the night of Tommy's death.

The man who was playing Michael in the last scene is now playing a very high Tommy, Danielle and Billy are drunk and Tommy keeps laughing with Billy, then becoming suddenly intimate with Danielle. Danielle and Billy keep stepping out of the scene to argue about how things went that last night because neither of them can remember. Finally their argument climaxes when Billy confesses to how he dared Tommy to jump off the cliff and Billy breaks down emotionally. Danielle also quiets and addresses Tommy's ghost, she tells him she can't remember if she told him how much she loved him that night. Tommy hushes her and holds her and tells her she must start living life and that she can't be so caught up in that night. Then Tommy speaks to Danielle in the language of angels and relieves her of her guilt. Billy then tries to reach out to Tommy but time is shifting back into present time; the parking lot with Michael. Billy is confused and angry and shoots Michael.

Allison tells how Billy took off the night he shot Michael, but was soon apprehended by the police. He confessed that he shot Michael, didn't even know who he was. She says that she asked him why, but he never could tell. She says she hasn't seen him since he went to prison. Sh says that she was in love with him and that what happened broke her heart.

Allison disappears leaving Danielle alone, singing.

=== Between ===
There is a short scene titled ‘Between’ before Part III. In this bit, Seth retells what happened to all of the people in the cave. Then a mother and daughter- the voices- speak; the daughter questions her mother about angels and how they might be able to fly.

=== Part III ===
Part III is set in Danielle's house, and JB is there. The pair engage in a lot of awkward small talk. Danielle seems more alive and at peace, while JB seems more tense. When Danielle directly asks him why he came to see her, he dodges the question, and starts talking about the weather and drinking. Danielle says she's quit drinking and JB suddenly arches his back in pain. Danielle asks him again if he had any particular reason for coming to see her, and JB starts to talk about people from to the cave. He is haunted by Joline, his girlfriend at the time who died mysteriously in her sleep the same year Celie was killed. Danielle holds him and he holds her. He starts to run his fingers over the needle scars in her arm. JB starts to talk about Seth and Kendra, asking if Danielle had seen or heard from them recently. Danielle says she has never heard from Kendra, though she states that before Seth went into the cave to find Celie, he came to Danielle. He told her how there is a ladder between heaven and earth and that souls can go up it and come down, and that he had seen it. JB asks Danielle to remember the night with Celie but Danielle has left that night behind her. JB is still very haunted by his past while Danielle seems to have parted with it. JB tells how he found Sean, shot through the chest, supposedly a hunting accident. From JB's stories you can tell that he believes all of the deaths were caused by Celie but isn't willing to admit that to himself. Finally, he leaves Danielle, still haunted by ghosts of the past. Finally, Danielle hears a knocking on the door and calls in Celie's ghost, telling her that she has found another song they can sing together.
