= Aries Keck =

American journalist and author

- Occupations: Radio journalist, science writer, travel writer
- Writing career
- Genre: Science

Aries Keck (born) is the communications lead for Earth Applied Sciences at NASA HQ. She previously was the social media lead at NASA Goddard Space Flight Center in Greenbelt, Md, the first-ever time NASA Goddard had someone in that position full-time. Her previous position at NASA Goddard was as a science writer for Earth science missions.

== Biography ==
Previous to being hired at NASA, Keck was the producer and director of Earthbeat Radio, an hour-long broadcast in America dedicated to global warming. From 2001 – 2006 Keck was a reporter for WHYY-FM in Philadelphia, for which she won a number of national Associated Press awards as well as a Gracie Award from American Women in Radio and Television. She is a frequent contributor to National Public Radio (NPR) and the public radio program Marketplace.

Keck is the author of the 2004 non-fiction book Einstein A to Z with co-author Karen C. Fox. She graduated from Lehigh University and lives in Washington, DC.
