= Caroline Adams Miller =

American life coach

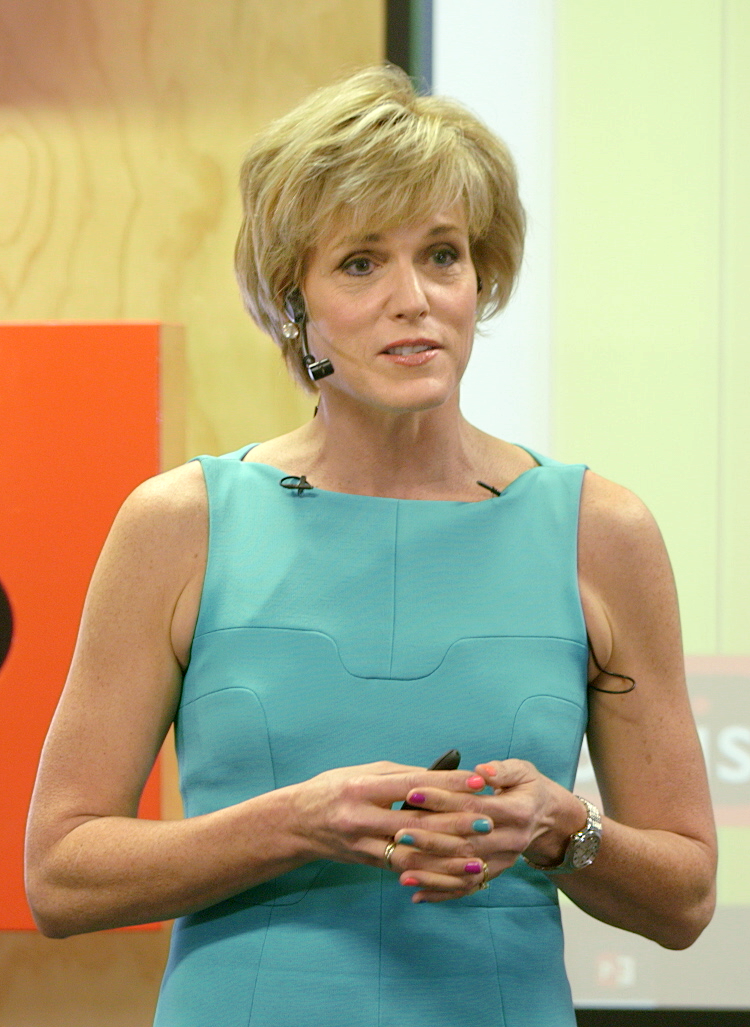
- Born: September 15, 1961 (age 64) Bethesda, Maryland, U.S.
- Occupation: Life coach, motivational speaker, author

Website
- www.carolinemiller.com

Caroline Adams Miller (born September 15, 1961) is an American executive coach and motivational speaker. Miller has written six books, including Getting Grit, Creating Your Best Life, and My Name is Caroline, which chronicles her struggle with bulimia.

== Early life and education ==
Before college, Miller attended the National Cathedral School for Girls in Washington, D.C. Afterwards, she graduated from Harvard magna cum laude, and in 2006 earned her Masters in Applied Positive Psychology from the University of Pennsylvania.

== Career ==
Miller was the co-founder and president of the Foundation for Education and Eating Disorders (FEED) in Bethesda, Maryland in the early 1990s.

== Personal life ==
Miller first started to diet when she was eight years old, developing an eating disorder while in 9th grade. For the next eight years, she suffered from bulimia. None of her family, including her husband, was aware of her eating disorder. In February 1984, she decided it was time to seek help and began to attend Overeaters Anonymous, eventually overcoming her disorder.

Miller chronicled her fight with bulimia in the memoir My Name is Caroline. She recounted, "It wasn't easy to go public about it, because bulimia still has that shame stigma attached to it." An excerpt of the book was the cover story of the March 1987 issue of the Washingtonian and was in Family Circle in 1988.

While in high school and college, Miller was a competitive swimmer. She resumed swimming in 2003 after a 23-year hiatus and is now a top-ranked Masters Swimmer in multiple events. Miller also has a black belt in Hapkido.

Miller lives in Bethesda, Maryland.
