= National Cathedral School =

Girls school in Washington, D.C., US

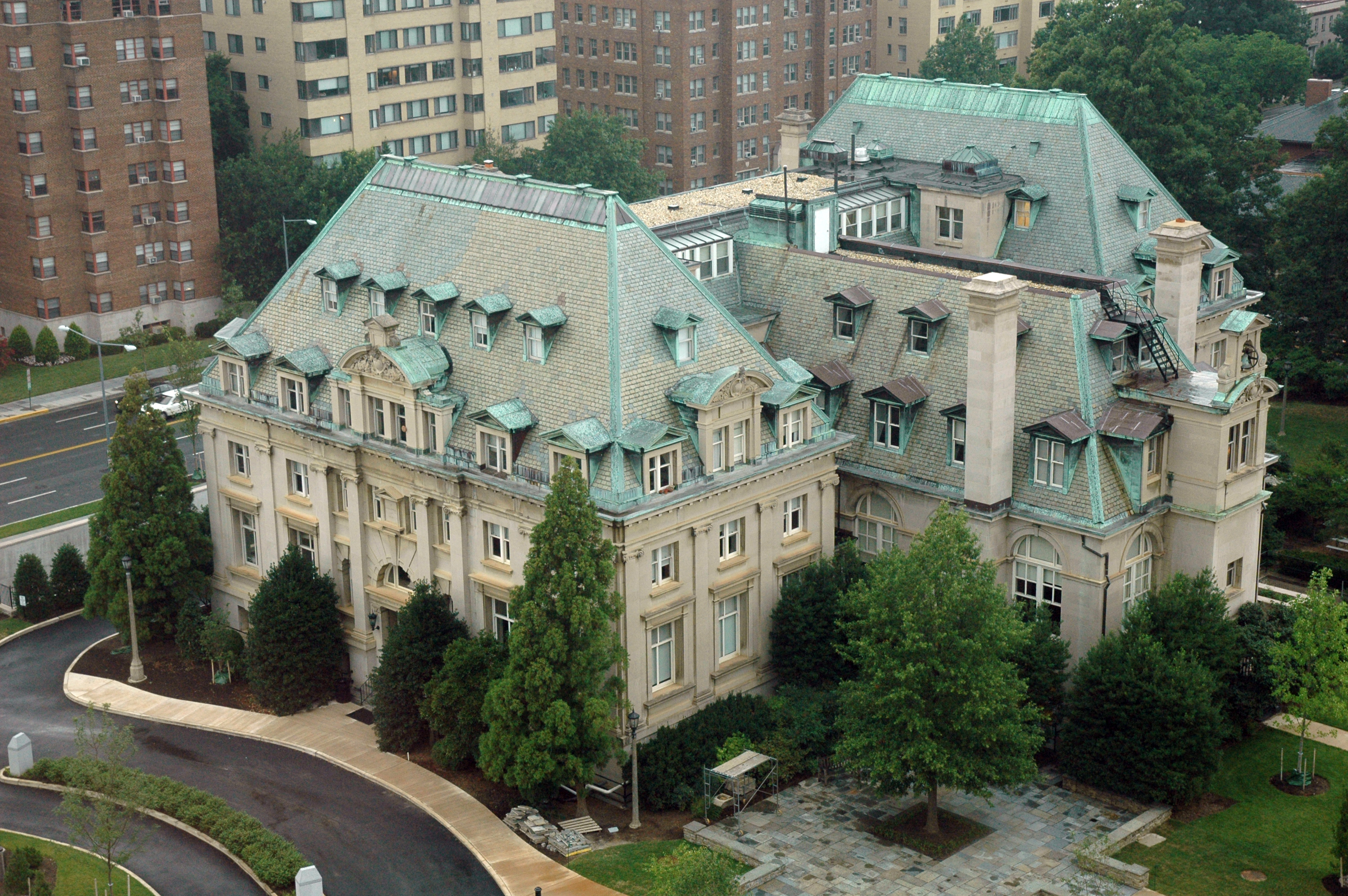

Location
- Mount Saint Alban; Washington, D.C. 20016; United States; 38°55′53″N 77°04′20″W

Information
- Type: Private, day, college prep
- Motto: We believe in the power of young women
- Religious affiliation: Episcopal
- Patron saint: Hilda of Whitby
- Established: 1900 (126 years ago)
- CEEB code: 090135
- Head of school: Elinor Scully
- Faculty: ~70
- Grades: 4–12
- Gender: Girls
- Enrollment: ~595
- Student to teacher ratio: 8:1
- Colors: Purple and gold
- Athletics conference: ISL; DCSAA
- Team name: Eagles
- Accreditation: MSA; AIMS MD-DC
- Website: ncs.cathedral.org

National Cathedral School (NCS) is an independent Episcopal private day school for girls in grades 4–12 located on the grounds of the Washington National Cathedral in Washington, D.C., United States. Founded by philanthropist and suffragist Phoebe Apperson Hearst and Bishop Henry Yates Satterlee in 1900, NCS is the oldest of the institutions constituting the Protestant Episcopal Cathedral Foundation.

== About ==
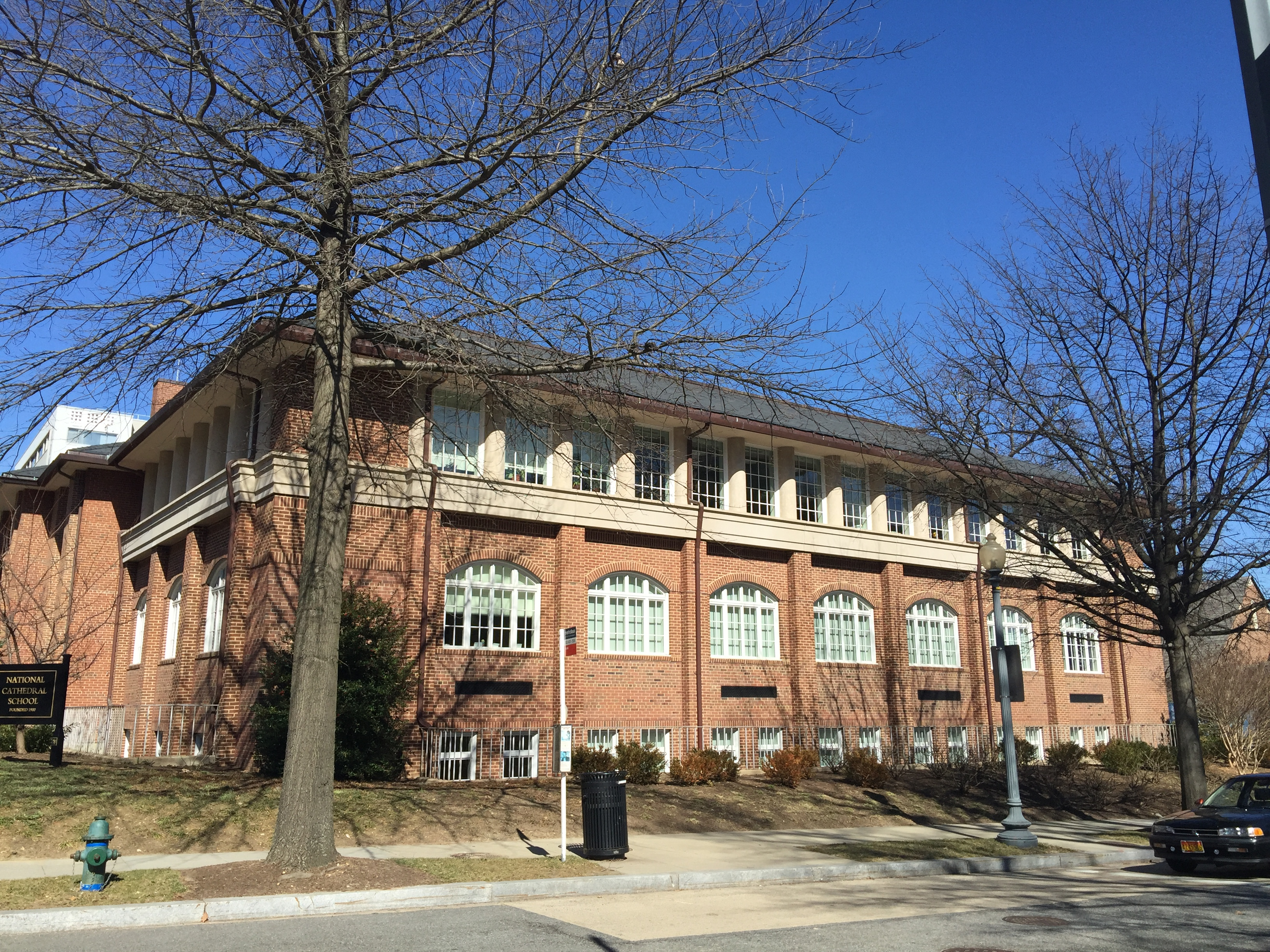
Woodley North Classroom building

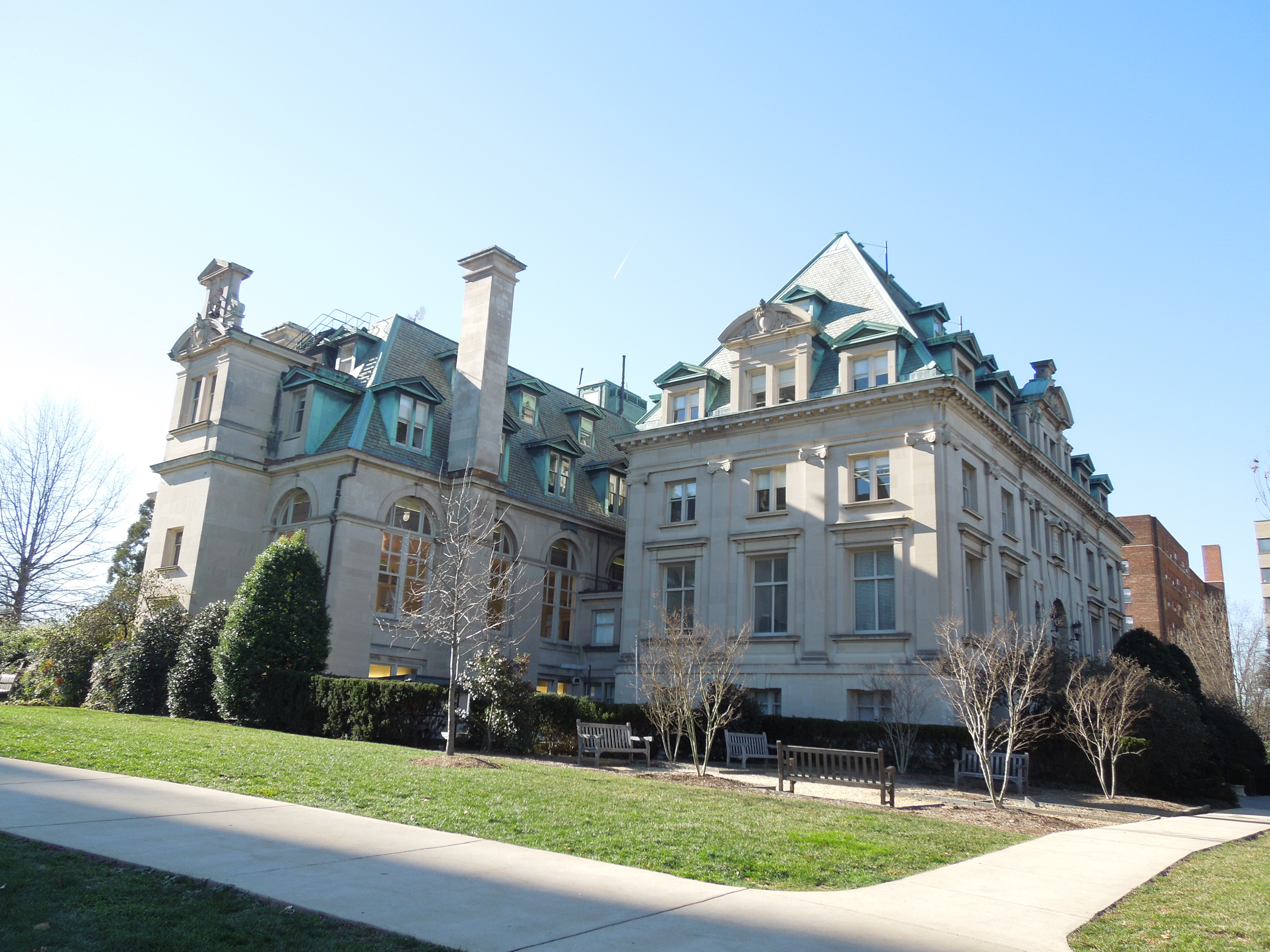
Hearst Hall

NCS has about 580 students in grades 4 through 12. Its mascot is the eagle. Its brother school, St. Albans, and the shared coeducational elementary school (K–3), Beauvoir, are also located on the 57-acre (230,000 m^{2}) Cathedral Close in Northwest Washington near the Washington National Cathedral. Elinor Scully is the twelfth Head of School.

== Notable alumnae ==
- Bella Alarie 2016, former WNBA player with the Dallas Wings
- Ashton Applewhite '70. best-selling author, journalist, ageism expert and advocate
- Judith Barcroft, actress, All My Children and other soap operas
- Sydney Barta 2022, 2020 US Paralympian Track and Field
- Esther Brimmer, foreign policy expert and past Assistant Secretary of State for International Organization Affairs
- Mary Bruce (journalist),
- Beverly Byron '50, U.S. Congresswoman (D-Md.), 1978–1993
- Amanda Cassatt 2009, journalist and entrepreneur
- Paula Clark, Episcopal Bishop of Chicago
- Liz Clarke, sportswriter
- Kate Collins, actress
- Ethel Roosevelt Derby, civil rights spokesperson
- Karen C. Fox, science writer
- Karenna Gore '91, author, journalist, and attorney
- Kristin Gore '95, author and Emmy-nominated screenwriter
- Libby Fischer Hellmann, mystery writer
- Alice Hill '74, policy maker and academic
- Katharine Holmes, Olympic fencer at the 2016 Summer Olympics
- Alice S. Huang, biologist, former president of AAAS
- Naomi Iizuka, Japanese-American playwright, professor at UCSB
- Luci Baines Johnson, '65, daughter of U.S. President Lyndon Baines Johnson
- Lynda Bird Johnson Robb, '62, daughter of U.S. President Lyndon Baines Johnson
- Kate Kelly '93, journalist and author
- Kara Kennedy, filmmaker and television producer
- Heather Langenkamp, actress, A Nightmare on Elm Street
- Jenny Lin, Taiwanese-American pianist
- Maya MacGuineas, political writer and President of the Committee for a Responsible Federal Budget
- Leslie Marshall, journalist and novelist
- Petra Mayer '94, journalist and book reviewer
- Caroline Adams Miller, coach, speaker, and author
- Queen Noor of Jordan, née Lisa Halaby, writer, activist
- Michelle Nunn, non-profit executive; former political candidate
- Cristina Odone, Italian journalist, editor, writer
- Alexandra Petri, op-ed columnist and writer of the ComPost Blog at the Washington Post
- Brenda Putnam, sculptor
- Stephanie Ready, professional and college basketball broadcaster; first woman to coach US men's professional basketball
- Helene Reynolds, actress in the 1940s
- Susan Rice, former director of the Domestic Policy Council, National Security Advisor, and United States Ambassador to the United Nations
- Ruth Starr Rose, painter
- Sandra Scarr, former chair of the psychology department at University of Virginia
- Trish Sie, music video, commercial, and feature film director (Pitch Perfect 3)
- Mary Elizabeth Taylor, former Assistant Secretary of State for Legislative Affairs
- Manjushree Thapa, Nepali-born Canadian author and essayist
- Tejshree Thapa, Human rights attorney and lifelong advocate for women and children
- Caroline Thompson, screenwriter, Edward Scissorhands
- Elizabeth Walton Vercoe, musician, educator, and composer
- Margaret Hicks Williams 1918, government official, writer, political expert
- Robin Witt, theater director

== Notable former faculty ==
- Gladys Milligan, art instructor
- Lola Sleeth Miller, art instructor
