= Mary Bruce (journalist) =

American television journalist

- Born: Washington, D.C., United States
- Education: Washington University in St. Louis (BA)
- Occupation: Chief White House correspondent
- Years active: 2005–present
- Employer: ABC News

Mary Bruce is an American TV journalist working at ABC News as the network's Chief White House correspondent based in Washington, D.C. She covers politics, presidential administrations, and elections. Her reports can be seen on Good Morning America, ABC World News Tonight, Nightline, and 20/20. She serves as a fill-in anchor on GMA, World News Tonight, and regularly appears on ABC News Live programs and ABC News Radio.

== Early life and education ==
Born in Washington, D.C., United States, Bruce enrolled in the National Cathedral School and graduated with a high school diploma. She attended Washington University in St. Louis, where she wrote and edited the student newspaper, and graduated with a bachelor's degree in history and Spanish.

== Career ==
Bruce began her career by joining ABC News in 2006 as a desk assistant and worked her way through producing roles behind the scenes until she got her big break in 2015 when she was promoted to multi-platform reporter and extensively covered Congress and major political events. Among them were Pope Francis' historic visit to Washington D.C. in 2015 and the 2016 California wildfires. She also traveled abroad and covered the 2015 European migrant crisis and numerous presidential trips overseas. In the 2016 United States presidential election, she traveled around the U.S. reporting for ABC News' coverage of the presidential campaigns.

In 2017, she was promoted to senior congressional correspondent. In this role, she reported from Capitol Hill and covered the confirmations of the Supreme Court justices, led ABC News' coverage of the First impeachment of Donald Trump, the Russian interference in the 2016 United States elections, the Mueller report, the health care and tax reform fights and the Second impeachment of Donald Trump. Bruce then led the network's election coverage of the 2020 United States presidential election as ABC News' lead campaign correspondent, extensively covering the Biden campaign and the primaries through major events. In addition, she reported on the presidential and vice presidential debates and conventions of the election.

In 2021, Bruce was promoted to senior White House correspondent on ABC News, covering the Biden Administration and the 2022 United States midterm elections. She was then promoted to Chief White House correspondent covering President Joe Biden's reelection campaign and his decision to withdraw from the race, including Vice President Kamala Harris' subsequent campaign in the 2024 United States presidential election. In early 2025, she was announced as the lead correspondent for ABC News' coverage of the transition to President-elect Donald Trump's second administration.

US President Donald Trump responds to Bruce's question about releasing the Epstein files during his meeting with Saudi Crown Prince Mohammed bin Salman.

In November 2025, following a meeting at the White House between President Donald Trump and Saudi Crown Prince Mohammed bin Salman, Bruce asked: “Your Royal Highness, the U.S. intelligence concluded that you orchestrated the brutal murder of a journalist. 9/11 families are furious that you are here in the Oval Office. Why should Americans trust you?” Trump responded by dismissing the U.S. Intelligence findings over bin Salman's involvement in the assassination of Jamal Khashoggi. Then, when Bruce went on to question why Trump would not release the Epstein files, Trump attacked her, calling her a "terrible person and terrible reporter", and saying: "I think the license should be taken away from ABC because your news is so fake and it’s so wrong. And we have a great (FCC) commissioner, the chairman, who should look at that..."

== Awards and recognition ==
Bruce earned several awards for her work, often highlighting important issues. She also received awards for her investigative reporting and even featured her work in leading publications. She was awarded the Joan S. Barone Award by the Radio and Television Correspondents' Association for her outstanding reporting on Justice Brett Kavanaugh's confirmation to the Supreme Court and was recognized by her colleagues on Capitol Hill for doing so.
