= History of Oakland, California =

The history of Oakland, a city in the county of Alameda, California, can be traced back to the founding of a settlement by Horace Carpentier, Edson Adams, and Andrew Moon in the 19th century. The area now known as Oakland had seen human occupation for thousands of years, but significant growth in the settlements that are now incorporated into the city did not occur until the Industrial Revolution. Oakland was first incorporated as a town in 1852.

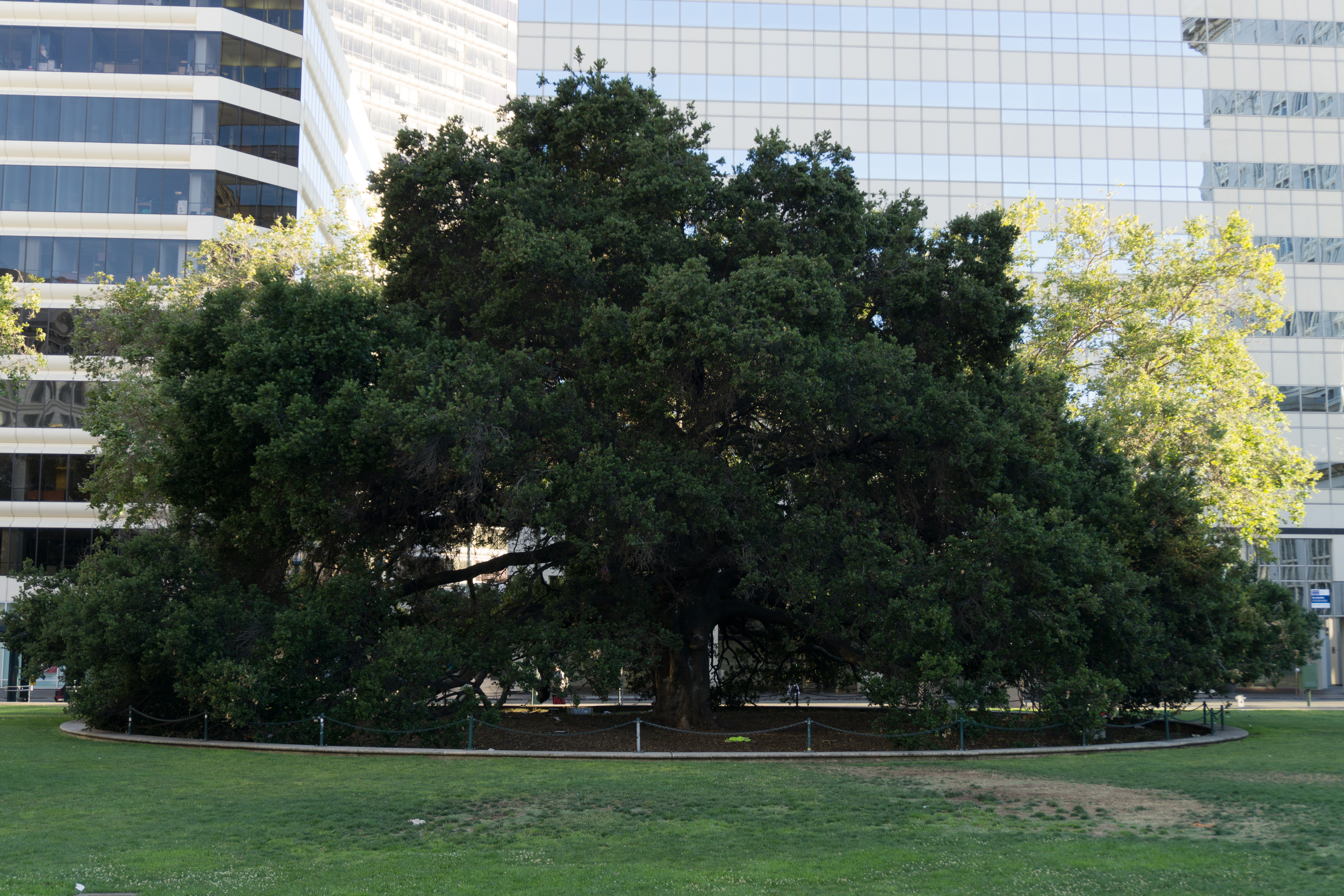
Oakland's Famous Tree in Frank H. Ogawa Plaza

== Ohlone Period ==
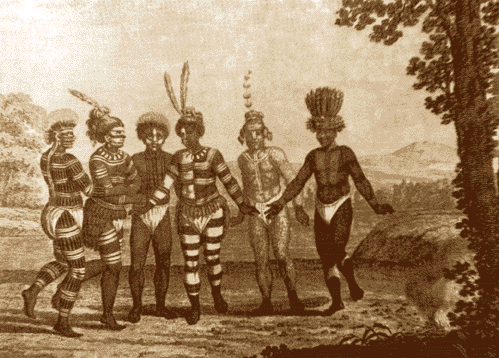
Ohlone People

Map of Ohlone Territory

The earliest known inhabitants were the Huchiun tribe, who had lived there since an unknown date. The Huchiun belong to a linguistic grouping later called the Ohlone (a Miwok word meaning "western people"). Oakland is one of an estimated 425 shellmound sites in the greater Bay Area. Shellmounds, man-made mounds of earth and organic matter built up by humans over thousands of years, were often used as burial locations and/or centers of community life for the local Indigenous population. Only four or so shellmounds are still visible, with many now under modern development. It is believed there is a shellmound under a Burger King in downtown Oakland.

== Spanish and Mexican Period ==
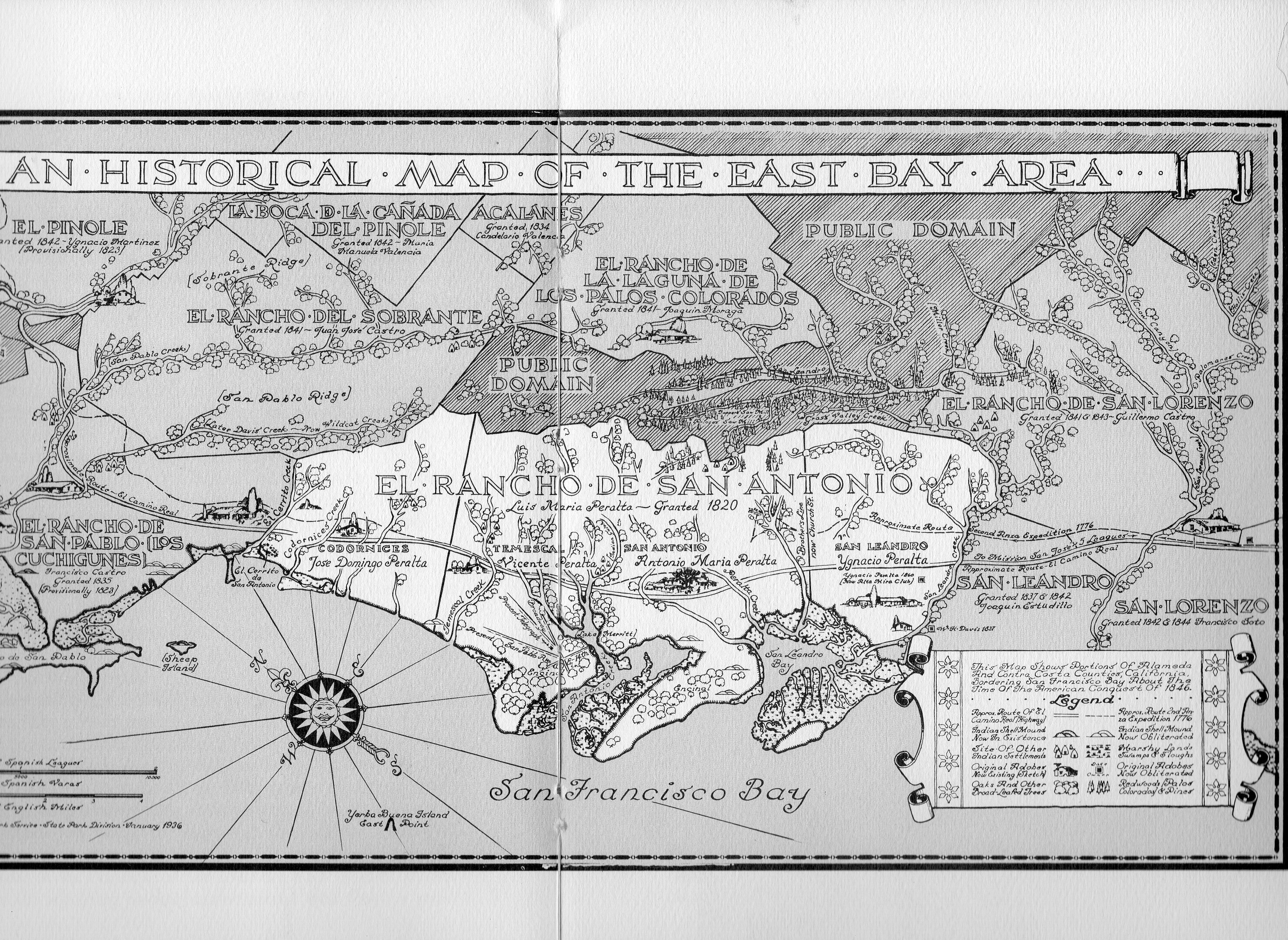
Map of Rancho San Antonio during Spanish and Mexican Period

Conquistadors from New Spain claimed Oakland, and other Ohlone lands of the East Bay, along with the rest of California, for the king of Spain in 1772. In the early 19th century, the Spanish crown deeded the East Bay area to Luis María Peralta for his Rancho San Antonio. The grant was confirmed by the successor Mexican republic upon its independence from Spain. Upon his death in 1842, Peralta divided his land among his four sons. Most of Oakland fell within the shares given to Antonio Maria and Vicente.

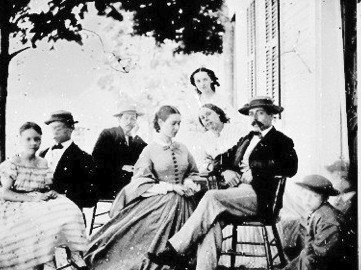
Peralta Family at their home in Oakland

The Peralta ranch included a stand of oak trees that stretched from the land that is today Oakland's downtown area to the adjacent part of Alameda, then a peninsula. The Peraltas called the area encinal, a Spanish word that means "oak grove". This was translated more loosely as "Oakland" in the subsequent naming of the town, as recounted by Horace Carpentier in his first address as mayor: "The chief ornament and attraction of this city consists, doubtless, in the magnificent grove of evergreen oaks which covers its present site and from which it takes both its former name of 'Encinal' and its present one of 'Oakland.'" The trees were California live oaks which are the dominant overstory plant of the coast live oak woodland habitat.

Use of Oakland's old-growth redwoods played a major role in the city's early economic history. A redwood forest of approximately five square miles spanned the Oakland hills, with some trees rising to 300 feet. Many of the redwoods were from 12 to 20 feet in diameter, and one was measured at 32 feet. The forest was so prominent that ships entering San Francisco Bay would use it as a navigational landmark.

Initially, small scale logging provided lumber to local ranches and missions. After an export market developed in the 1830s, cutting rose to levels that alarmed the Peralta family, who owned the forest but had permitted non-commercial exploitation by outsiders. Logs would be hauled to the edge of San Francisco Bay, often by routes known today as Redwood Road and Park Boulevard, then shipped across the bay to a rapidly growing San Francisco.

Increasing numbers of adventurers arrived in the 1840s and began logging without regard to the Peralta family or the Mexican authorities. The start of the Gold Rush brought a brief lull to logging as loggers headed to the Sierras in search of gold. But the ensuing building boom increased lumber prices ten- to twenty-fold, and logging soon resumed. For some, cutting trees could more reliably produce a fortune than hunting for ever more elusive gold. Although the 1848 Treaty of Guadalupe Hidalgo that concluded the Mexican-American war had supported existing Mexican legal arrangements, the Peraltas lost control of the forest.

In 1850 the first steam-powered sawmill was erected within the forest, with three more mills added by 1852. By 1853 there were more men cutting redwoods than people living in any East Bay town. By 1860, the entire forest had been obliterated. Today's Redwood Regional Park is much smaller than the original forest, and is populated by much smaller redwoods.

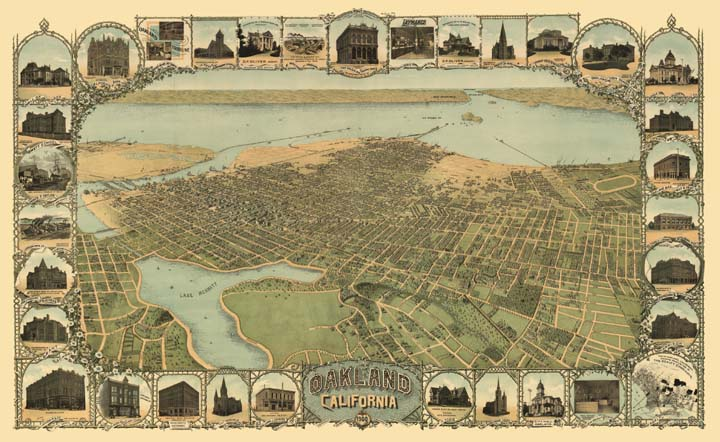
Depiction of Oakland in 1900.

== American Appropriation Period ==
As part of the Treaty of Guadalupe Hidalgo following the Mexican–American War, the Mexican government ceded 525,000 square miles (1,360,000 km^{2}); 55% of its pre-war territory (excluding Texas) to the US in exchange for $15 million. The Treaty also provided for the safeguarding of the land and property of Mexican citizens. This provision was regularly ignored by squatters and land speculators, some of whom began settling on the Peralta Ranch, particularly during the Gold Rush. Before Congress created a Land Commission in 1851 to pursue a settlement of property claims, a group of three men—Horace Carpentier, Edson Adams, and Andrew Moon—backed at one point by a small army of some 200 men hired from San Francisco, began developing a small settlement on Peralta land initially called "Contra Costa" ("opposite shore", the Spanish name for the lands on the east side of the Bay) in the area that is now downtown Oakland. The United States Post Office recognized this by establishing a post office there with the name "Contra Costa". Carpentier was elected to the California state legislature and got the Town of Oakland incorporated on May 4, 1852. By the time the Land Commission got around to confirming the Peraltas' claims in 1854, Oakland was quickly being further developed. The Peraltas in the meantime had been persuaded to sell various parcels of their vast holdings. In 1853, John Coffee "Jack" Hays, a famous Texas Ranger, was one of the first to establish residence in Oakland while performing his duties as sheriff of San Francisco.

== Early American Period ==
On March 25, 1854, Oakland was re-incorporated as the City of Oakland. Horace Carpentier was elected the first mayor. His tenure did not last, however. He was ousted in 1855 by an angry citizenry when it was discovered that he had acquired exclusive rights to the waterfront from the Town Board of Trustees in 1852. Charles Campbell replaced him as Mayor on March 5, 1855.

During the city's early development, the small tidal estuary to the east of downtown had become the city's first sewer, but by the 1860s, the stench had become intolerable. Mayor Samuel Merritt (1867–1869) orchestrated the construction of a dam which raised the estuary's water level and turned it into Lake Merritt.

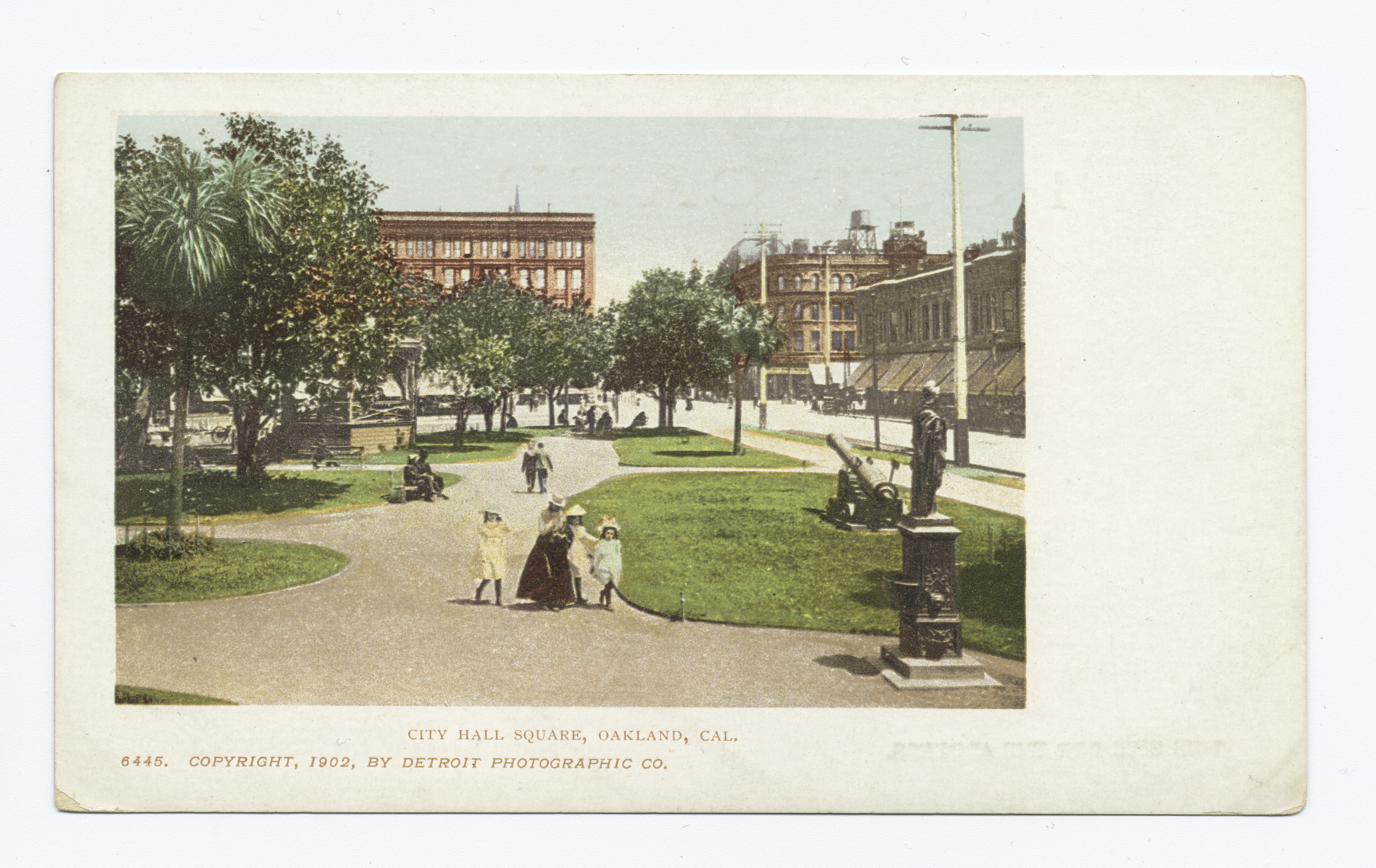
City Hall Square

The city and its environs quickly grew with the railroads, becoming a major rail terminal in the late 1860s and 1870s. In 1868, the Central Pacific constructed the Oakland Long Wharf at Oakland Point, the site of today's Port of Oakland. The Daily Alta California recognized this meant Oakland was to become the "future Jersey City of the Pacific Coast." The Long Wharf served as the terminus both for the Transcontinental Railroad and for local commuter trains of the Central (later, Southern) Pacific. The Central Pacific also established one of its largest rail yards and servicing facilities in West Oakland, which continued to be a major local employer under the Southern Pacific well into the 20th century. The principal depot of the Southern Pacific in Oakland was the 16th Street Station located at 16th and Wood, which is currently being restored as part of a redevelopment project. In 1871, Cyrus and Susan Mills paid $5,000 for the Young Ladies' Seminary in Benicia, renamed it Mills College, and moved it to its current location in Oakland, adjacent to what is now Seminary Boulevard. In 1872, the town of Brooklyn was incorporated into Oakland. Brooklyn, a large municipality southeast of Lake Merritt, was part of what was then called the Brooklyn Township.

A number of horsecar and cable car lines were constructed in Oakland during the latter half of the 19th century. The first electric streetcar set out from Oakland to Berkeley in 1891, and other lines were converted and added over the course of the 1890s. The various streetcar companies operating in Oakland were acquired by Francis "Borax" Smith and consolidated into what eventually became known as the Key System, the predecessor of today's publicly owned AC Transit. In addition to its system of streetcars in the East Bay, the Key System also operated commuter trains to its own pier and ferry boats to San Francisco, in competition with the Southern Pacific. Upon completion of the Bay Bridge, both companies ran their commuter trains on the south side of the lower deck, directly to San Francisco. The Key System in its earliest years was actually in part a real estate venture, with the transit part serving to help open up new tracts for buyers. The Key System's investors (incorporated as the "Realty Syndicate") also established two large hotels in Oakland, one of which survives as the Claremont Resort. The other, which burned down in the early 1930s, was the Key Route Inn, at what is now West Grand and Broadway. From 1904 to 1929, the Realty Syndicate also operated a major amusement park in north Oakland called Idora Park.

Redwoods were harvested from the East Bay Hills for construction in San Francisco, and "Rocky Hill" was purchased by poet Joaquin Miller in 1887. He planted trees, crops, and gardens, hosting thinkers, artists and literary figures from all over the world in "The Hights", which later became a park bearing his name. Tourists flocked from around the world to Miller's "hillside Bohemia".

== Early 1900s ==
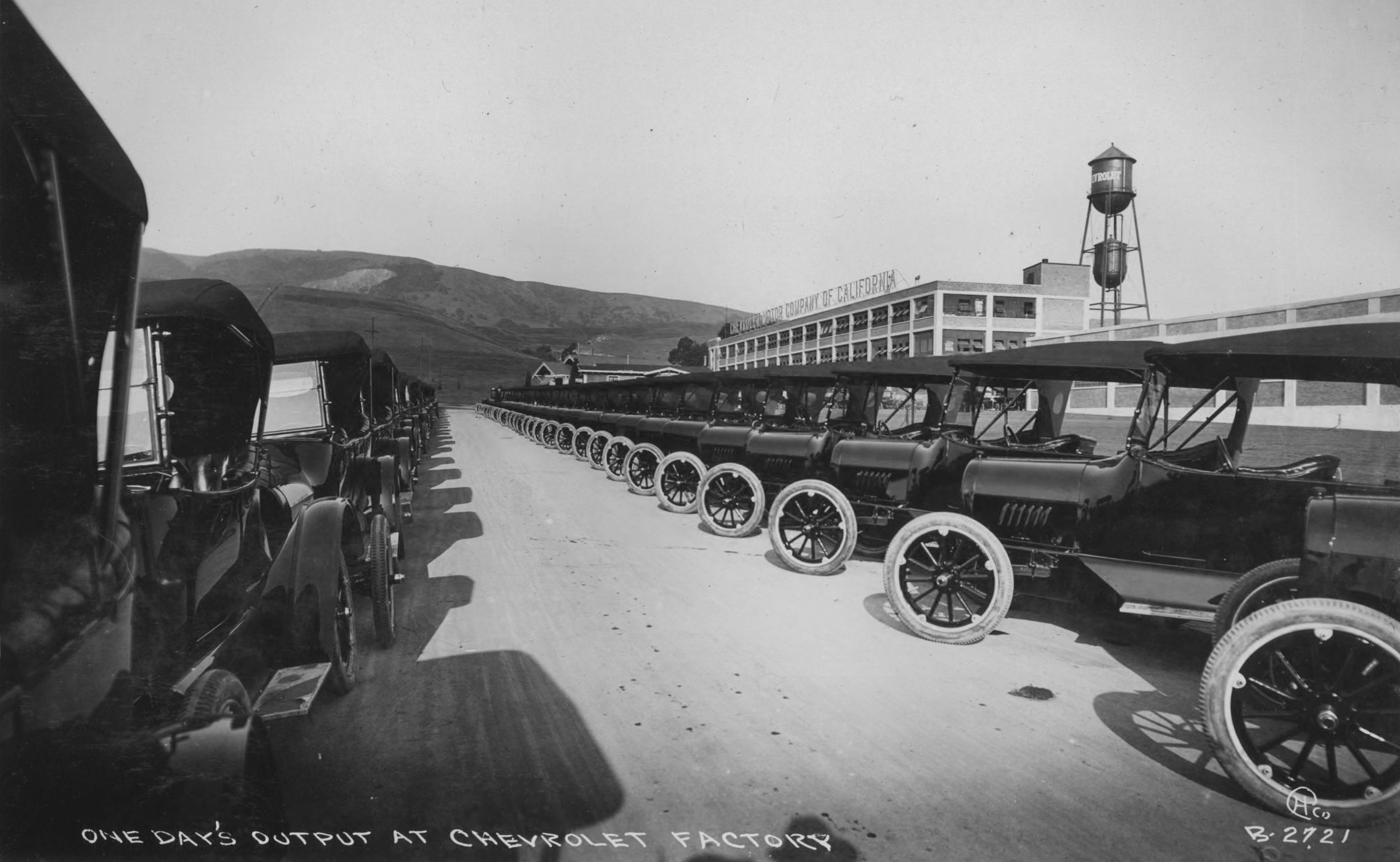
One day's output of 1917 Chevrolet automobiles at their major West Coast plant, now the location of Eastmont Town Center

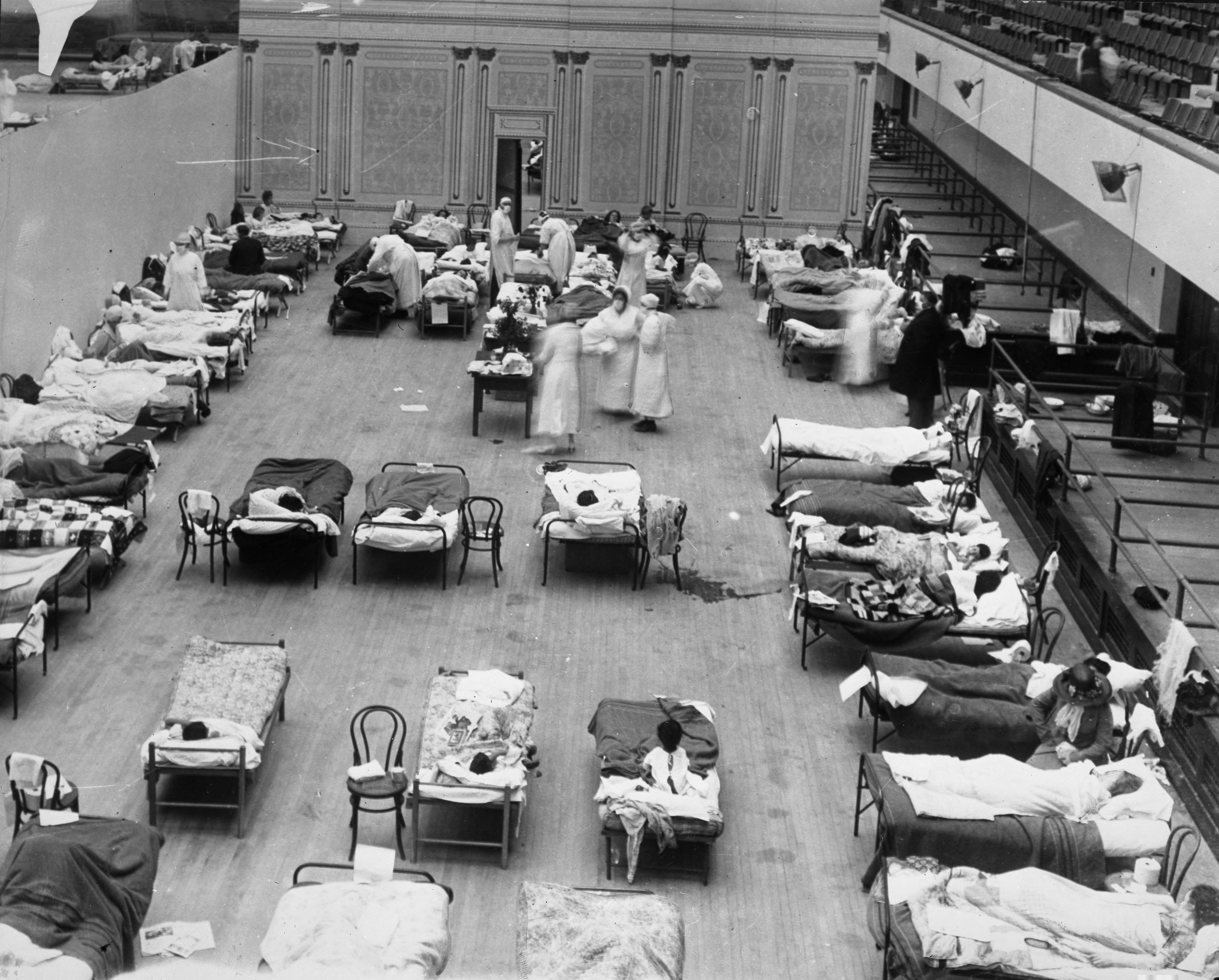
1918 flu pandemic victims are tended by American Red Cross nurses at the Oakland Municipal Auditorium (now the Henry J. Kaiser Convention Center)

The original extent of Oakland, upon its incorporation, lay south of today's major intersection of San Pablo Avenue, Broadway, and Fourteenth Street. The city gradually annexed farmlands and settlements to the east and the north. Oakland's rise to industrial prominence, and its subsequent need for a seaport, led to the digging of a shipping and tidal channel in 1902, which created an island of nearby town Alameda. In 1906, its population doubled with refugees made homeless after the 1906 San Francisco earthquake and fire. Concurrently, a strong City Beautiful movement, promoted by Mayor Frank Kanning Mott, was responsible for creating and preserving parks and monuments in Oakland, including major improvements to Lake Merritt and the construction of Oakland Civic Auditorium, which cost $1M in 1914. The Auditorium briefly served as an emergency ward and quarantine for some of the victims of the 1918 flu pandemic. The three waves of the pandemic killed more than 1,400, out of 216,000, Oakland residents.

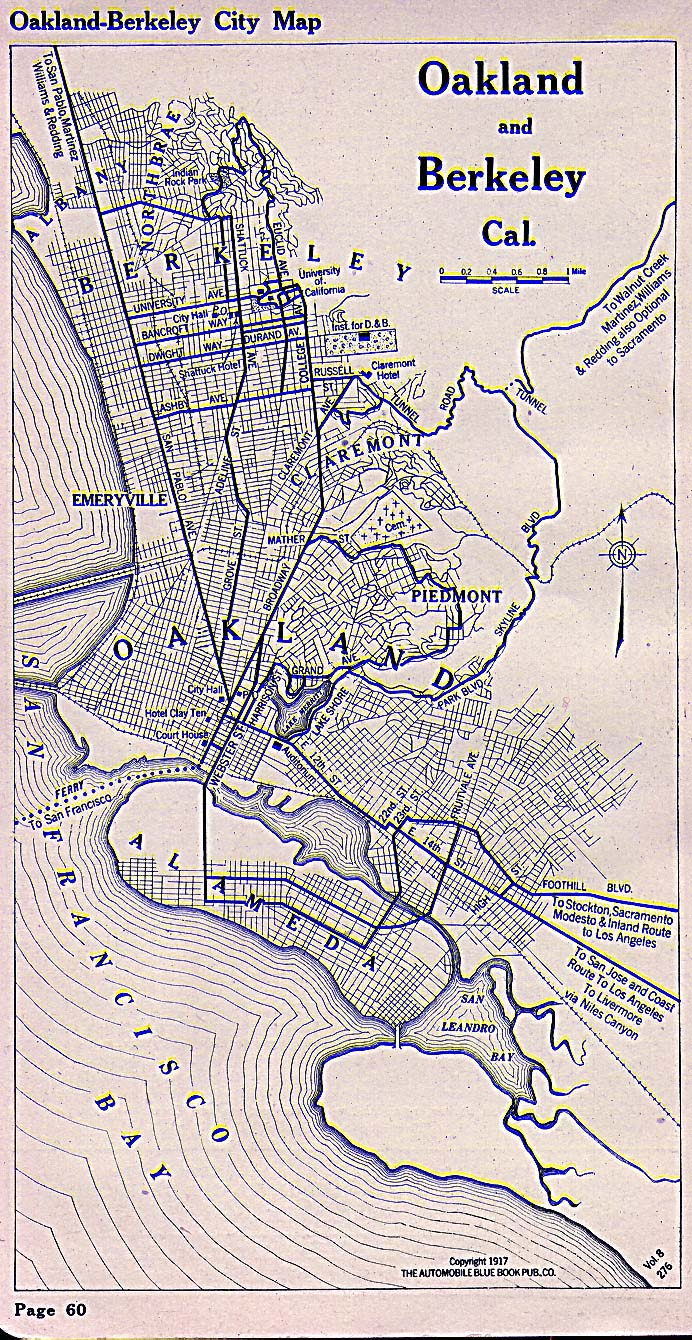
Map of Oakland area in 1917

By 1920, Oakland was the home of numerous manufacturing industries, including metals, canneries, bakeries, internal combustion engines, automobiles, and shipbuilding.

== 1920s ==
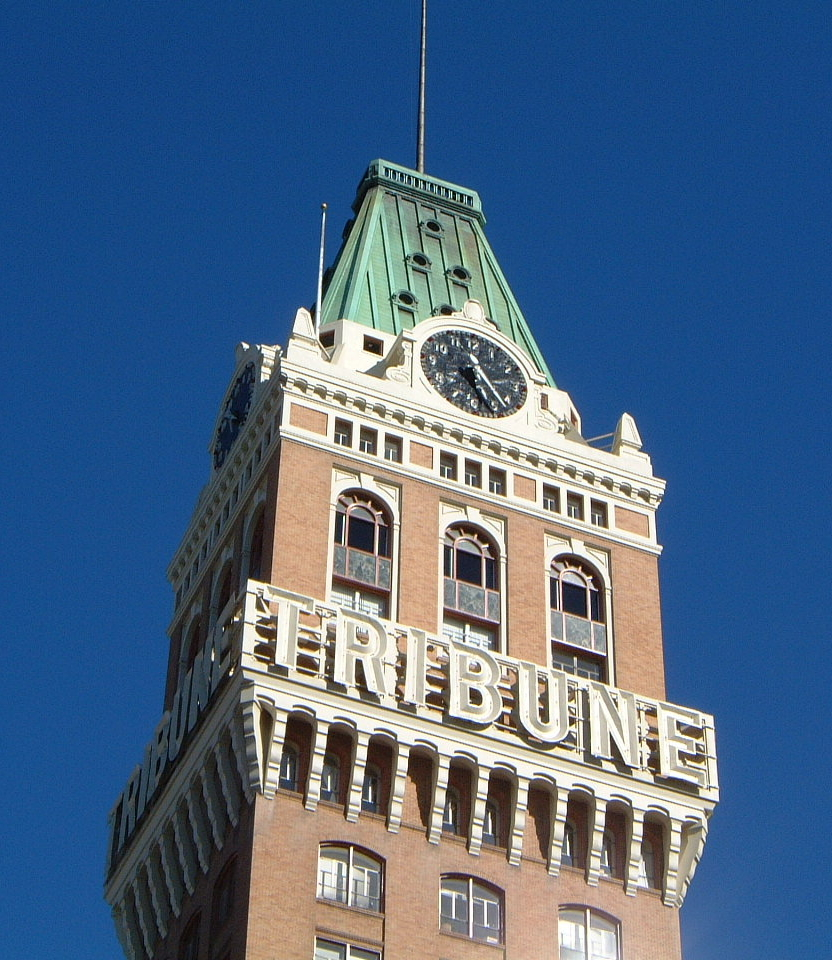
In 1924, the Tribune Tower was completed; in 1976, it was restored and declared an Oakland landmark.

The 1920s were economic boom years in the United States as a whole, and in California in particular. Economic growth was fueled by the general post–World War I recovery, as well as oil discoveries in Los Angeles and, most notably, the widespread introduction of the automobile. In 1916, General Motors opened a major Chevrolet automobile factory in East Oakland, making cars and then trucks until 1963, when it was moved to Fremont in southern Alameda County. Also in 1916, the Fageol Motor Company chose East Oakland for their first factory, manufacturing farming tractors from 1918 to 1923. In 1921, they introduced an influential low-slung "Safety Bus", followed quickly by the 22-seat "Safety Coach". Durant Motors operated a plant in Oakland from 1921 to 1930, manufacturing sedans, coupes, convertibles, and roadsters. By 1929, when Chrysler expanded with a new plant there, Oakland had become known as the "Detroit of the West".

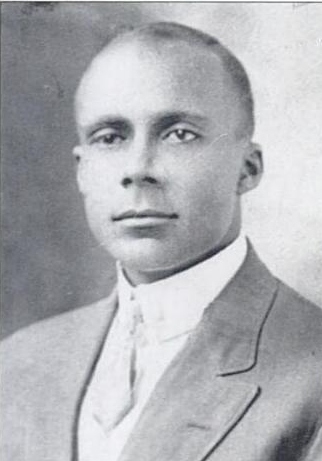
Dr. William M. Watts, photo from mid-1920s

Oakland expanded during the 1920s, flexing enough to meet the influx of factory workers. Approximately 13,000 homes were built between 1921 and 1924, more than between 1907 and 1920. Many of the large downtown office buildings, apartment buildings, and single-family houses still standing in Oakland were built during the 1920s; and they reflect the architectural styles of the time.

In 1926 Dr. William M. Watts (pictured left) opened a 22-bed hospital facility to provide in-patient care to Oakland's citizens of African descent who were not welcome at other health care institutions. The facility also offered training for African-American nurses.

The Rocky Road ice cream was created in Oakland in 1929, though accounts differ about its first promoter. William Dreyer of Dreyer's is said to have carried the idea of marshmallow and walnut pieces in a chocolate base over from his partner Joseph Edy's similar candy creation.

=== Aviation firsts ===
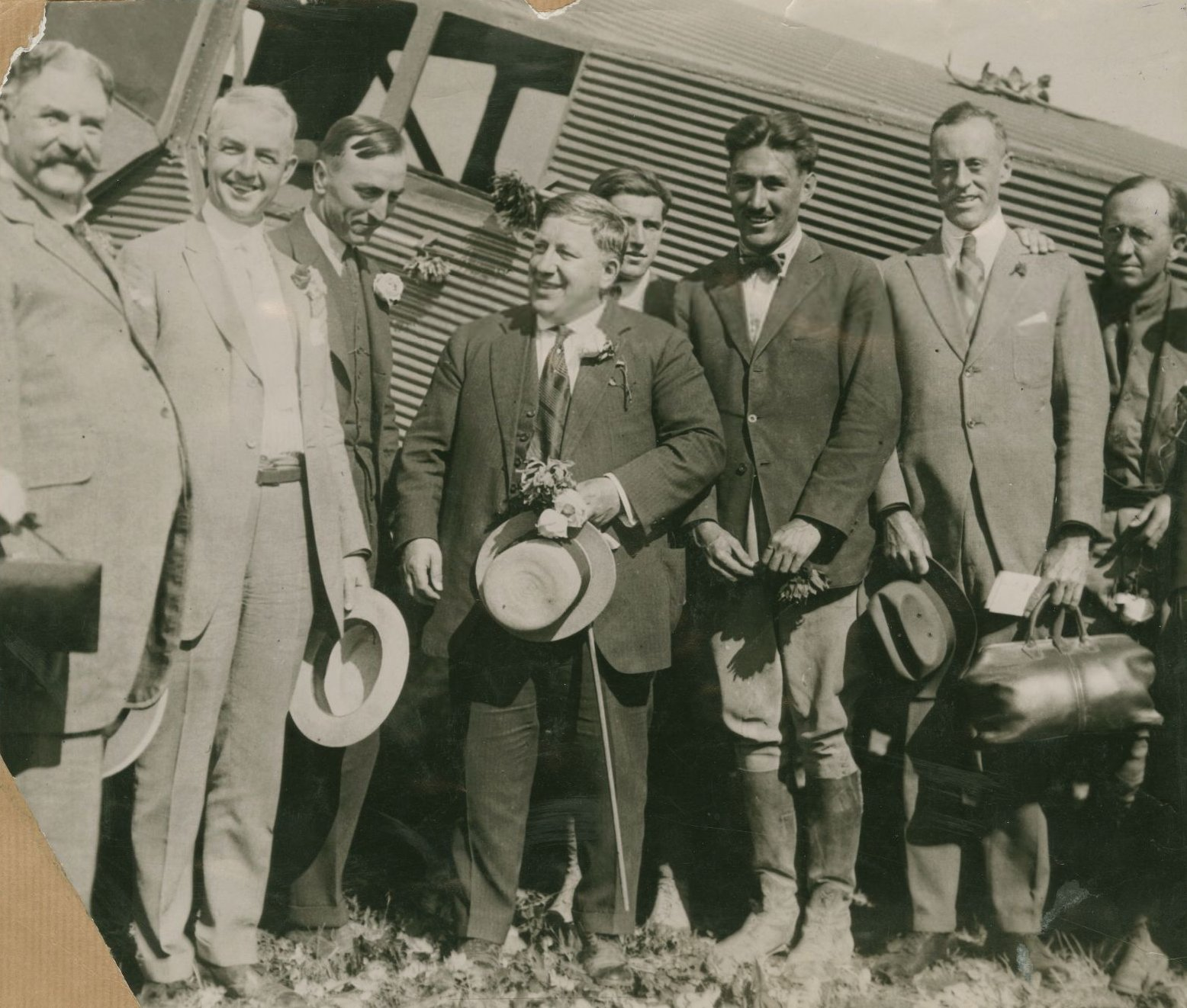
The first experimental transcontinental airmail through flight lands in Oakland. Left to right: Mayor John L. Davie, unknown, Eddie Rickenbacker, John M. Larsen (aircraft salesman), partially obscured unknown man, Bert Acosta (in cavalry boots), J. J. Rosborough (postmaster), unknown.

Russell Clifford Durant (called "Cliff" by his friends) was a race car driver, speedboat enthusiast, amateur flier, President of Durant Motors in Oakland, and son of General Motors founder William "Billy" Crapo Durant. In 1916, he established Durant Field at 82nd Avenue and East 14th Street. The first experimental transcontinental airmail through-flight finished its journey at Durant Field on August 9, 1920, with Army Capt. Eddie Rickenbacker and Navy Lt. Bert Acosta (pictured right) at the controls of the Junkers F 13 re-badged as the model J.L.6. The airfield served only secondary duties after 1927, as its runway was not long enough for heavily loaded aircraft. In April 1930, test pilot Herbert "Hub" Fahy and his wife Claire hit a stump upon landing, flipping their plane and mortally wounding Hub without injuring Claire. Durant Field was often called Oakland Airport, though the current Oakland International Airport was soon established four miles (6.4 km) southwest.

On September 17, 1927, Charles Lindbergh attended the official dedication of the new Oakland Airport. A month earlier, on August 16, participants in the disastrous Dole Air Race had taken off from Oakland's new 7,020-foot (2,140 m) runway headed for Honolulu, Hawaii, 2,400 miles (3,900 km) away—three fliers died before getting to the starting line in Oakland; five were lost at sea, attempting to reach Honolulu; and two more died searching for the lost five.

On May 31, 1928, Charles Kingsford Smith and his crew departed Oakland in Southern Cross on their successful bid to cross the Pacific by air, finishing in Australia. In October 1928, Oakland was used as a base for the World War I aircraft involved in the final filming of Howard Hughes' Hell's Angels. In 1928, aviator Louise Thaden took off from Oakland in a Travel Air to set a women's altitude record, as well as endurance and speed records.

On January 11, 1935, Amelia Earhart became the first person to fly solo from Honolulu, Hawaii, to Oakland, California.

On St. Patrick's Day, March 17, 1937, Earhart and her crew, Paul Mantz, Harry Manning and Fred Noonan, flew the first leg of her attempt to circumnavigate the globe, from Oakland to Honolulu, Hawaii. That attempt ended in Hawaii when her Lockheed Electra 10E was severely damaged. Later in the year, Earhart began her second, ill-fated attempt with the unpublicized first leg of her proposed transcontinental flight mapped from Oakland to Miami, Florida.

== World War II ==
During World War II, the East Bay was home to many war-related industries. Among these were the Kaiser Shipyards in nearby Richmond. The medical system devised for shipyard workers became the basis for the giant Kaiser Permanente HMO, which has a large medical center at MacArthur and Broadway, the first to be established by Kaiser. Oakland's Moore Dry Dock Company expanded its shipbuilding capabilities and built over 100 ships.

Valued at $100 million in 1943, Oakland's canning industry was its second-most-valuable war contribution after shipbuilding. Sited at both a major rail terminus and an important sea port, Oakland was a natural location for food processing plants, whose preserved products fed domestic, foreign, and military consumers. The largest canneries were in the Fruitvale District and included the Josiah Lusk Canning Company, the Oakland Preserving Company (which started the Del Monte brand), and the California Packing Company.

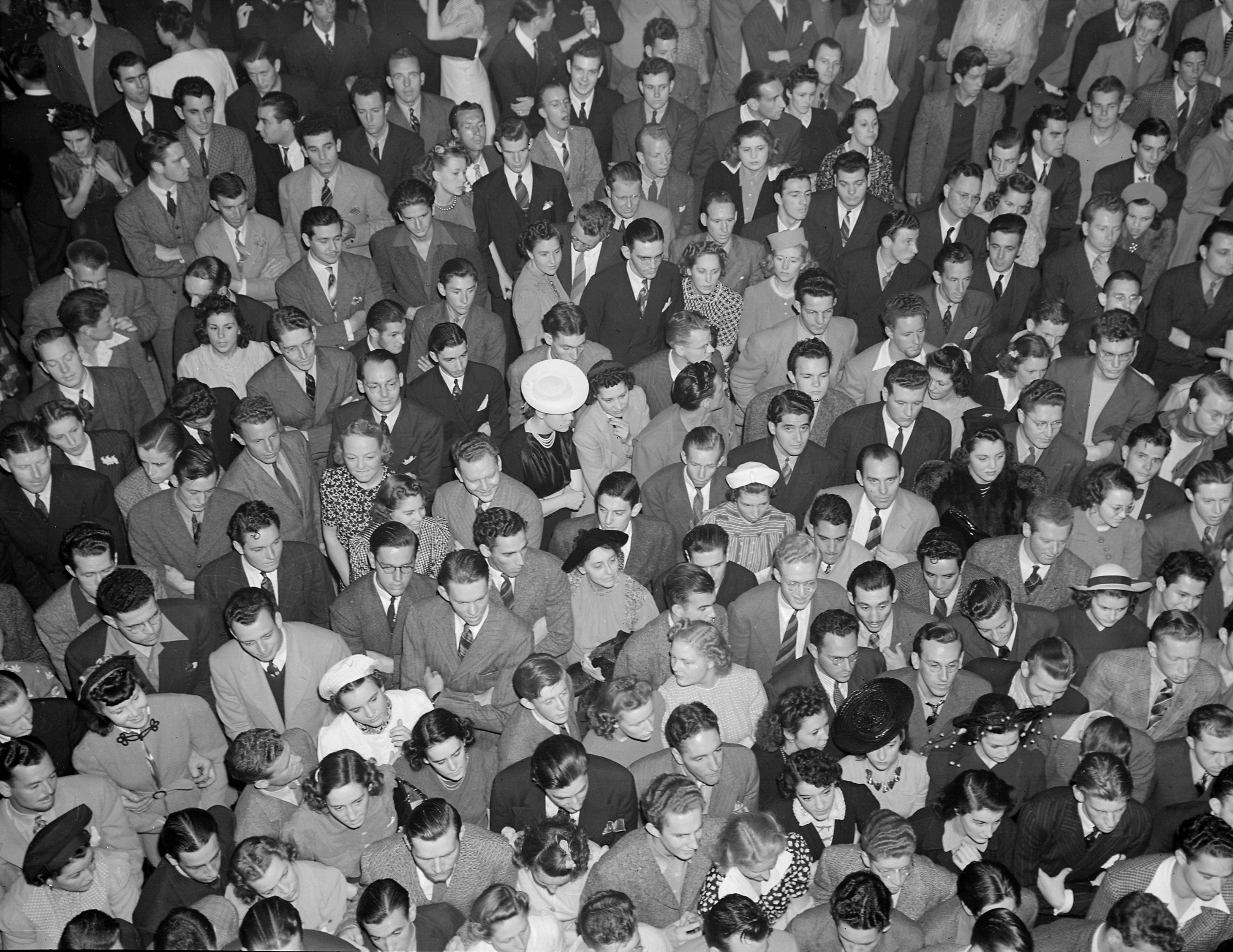
A crowd of young people at the concert of the Benny Goodman Band at a local dance hall. April 1940

Prior to World War II, black Americans constituted about 3% of Oakland's population. The war attracted tens of thousands of laborers from around the country, and thousands of black people were part of the Second Great Migration to the city from Alabama, Arkansas, Georgia, Louisiana, Mississippi, Missouri, South Carolina, Tennessee, and Texas—sharecroppers and tenant farmers who had been recruited by Henry J. Kaiser to work in his shipyards. The influx of black and white shipyard workers from the deep South brought Jim Crow attitudes to a part of the country that largely had been free of segregationist sentiment. In addition, black people further suffered from federally enforced redlining which designated Fruitvale and other Oakland neighborhoods as unfavorable. For instance, a 1937 Home Owners' Loan Corporation map of the area indicated these so-called detrimental influences: "Odors from industries. Predominance of foreign inhabitants. Infiltration of Negroes and Orientals."

Many Mexican Americans from states like New Mexico, Texas, and Colorado came to Oakland to work in the many wartime jobs as did many Mexican nationals who came under the Bracero Program. Many worked for the Southern Pacific Railroad, at its major rail yard in West Oakland (see traquero). While some of the rail workers lived near the yard, most of the Mexican community was concentrated as it always had been since the early days of the Peralta ranch in the Fruitvale District. Oakland experienced its own "zoot suit riots" in downtown Oakland in 1943 in the wake of the one in Los Angeles.

The Mai Tai cocktail was first concocted in Oakland in 1944, and it became very popular at Trader Vic's restaurant. Established in 1932, just four years later, Trader Vic's was so successful San Francisco Chronicle columnist Herb Caen was inspired to write, "the best restaurant in San Francisco is in Oakland". Trader Vic's was chosen by the State Department as the official entertainment center for foreign dignitaries attending United Nations meetings in San Francisco. The restaurant continued to grow in popularity and was running out of room when, in 1951, founder Victor Bergeron opened a larger one in San Francisco. In 1972, the flagship Oakland restaurant moved to the nearby Emeryville Marina.

== Post-WWII (1940s and 1950s) ==
View of Lake Merritt looking southwest from the northeastern tip of the lake

In 1946 National City Lines (NCL), a General Motors holding company, acquired 64% of Key System stock; during the next several years NCL engaged in the conspiratorial dissolution of Oakland's electric streetcar system. NCL converted the Key System's electric streetcar fleet to diesel buses, tracks were removed from Oakland's streets, and the lower deck of the Bay Bridge was converted to automobile traffic, which reduced the passenger-carrying capacity of the bridge. Freeways were constructed, which partitioned the social and retail fabric of neighborhoods. In the 1948 federal case United States v. National City Lines Inc., the defendants were found guilty on a count of conspiring to monopolize the provision of parts and supplies to their subsidiary companies. The companies were each fined $5,000, and the directors were each fined one dollar. The verdicts were upheld on appeal in 1951. The state Legislature created the Alameda and Contra Costa Transit District in 1955, which still exists today as AC Transit, the third-largest bus-only transit system in the nation.

Soon after the war, with the disappearance of Oakland's shipbuilding industry and the decline of its automobile industry, jobs became scarce. Many of the city's more affluent residents, both black and white, left the city after the war, moving to neighboring Alameda, Berkeley, Albany and El Cerrito to the north; to San Leandro, Hayward, Castro Valley and Fremont in Southern Alameda County; and to the newly developing East Bay suburbs in Contra Costa County, Orinda, Lafayette, Pleasant Hill, Walnut Creek and Concord. Between 1950 and 1960, about 100,000 white property owners moved out of Oakland—part of a nationwide phenomenon called white flight.

By the end of World War II, black Americans constituted about 12% of Oakland's population, and the years following the war saw this percentage rise. There was also an increase in racial tension. Starting in the late 1940s, the Oakland Police Department began recruiting white officers from the South to deal with the expanding black population and changing racial attitudes; many were openly racist, and their repressive police tactics exacerbated racial tensions.

Oakland was the center of a general strike during the first week of December 1946, one of six cities across the country that experienced such a strike after World War II. It was one of the largest strike movements in American history, as workers were determined not to let management repeat the union busting that followed World War I. Oakland, which had experienced some relative racial harmony prior to the war, found itself by the late 1950s with a population that was becoming progressively more poor and racially divided.

Beginning in the mid-1950s, much of West Oakland was destroyed, after then-Highway 17, now I-880 (or Nimitz Freeway) was built. Many homes and businesses were destroyed to build the Cypress Viaduct and the rest of the Nimitz Freeway. Also urban renewal caused the destruction of the area around Market and 7th streets to make way for the Acorn High Rise apartments. This urban renewal of West Oakland continued into the 1960s with the construction of BART and the Main Post Office Building at 1675 7th Street. Many families were displaced from West Oakland by the construction of the Nimitz Freeway and the urban renewal of West Oakland. The majority of these were African-American and Latino. African Americans relocated to East Oakland as well especially the Elmhurst district and surrounding areas.

== 1960s and 1970s ==
In 1960, Kaiser Corporation erected its headquarters at the former site of Holy Names University, at the corner of 20th and Harrison Streets. It was the largest skyscraper in Oakland, as well as "the largest office tower west of Chicago" up to that time. During this era, the oldest section of Oakland at the foot of Broadway, Jack London Square, was redeveloped into a hotel and outdoor retail district. During the 1960s, the city was home to an innovative funk music scene that produced well-known bands like Sly and the Family Stone, Graham Central Station, Tower of Power, Cold Blood, Azteca, and the Headhunters. Larry Graham, the bass player for both Sly and the Family Stone and Graham Central Station, is credited with the creation of the influential slap and pop sound still widely used by bassists in many musical idioms today.

By 1966, only 16 of the city's 661 police officers were black. Tensions between the black community and the largely white police force were high, and police malfeasance against black people was common. The Black Panther Party was founded by students Huey Newton and Bobby Seale at Merritt College.

It was also during the 1960s that the Oakland chapter of the Hells Angels Motorcycle Club began to grow into a formidable motorcycle gang and organized crime syndicate. The Hells Angels clubhouse is still located on Oakland's Foothill Boulevard.

During the 1970s, Oakland began to experience serious problems with gang-controlled dealing of heroin and cocaine when drug kingpin Felix Mitchell created the nation's first large-scale operation of this kind. Both violent crime and property crime increased during this period, and Oakland's murder rate rose to twice that of San Francisco or New York City.

In late 1973, the Symbionese Liberation Army assassinated Oakland's superintendent of schools, Dr. Marcus Foster, and badly wounded his deputy, Robert Blackburn. Two months later, two men were arrested and charged with the murder. Both received life sentences, though one was acquitted after an appeal and a retrial seven years later.

In the late 1960s and early 1970s the Fruitvale District was part of the Chicano Movement. In 1968 the Oakland Police murdered a young Chicano named Charles (Pinky) De Baca on 35th Avenue in East Oakland. A group called Latinos United for Justice organized to combat police brutality after Mr. De Baca's murder. Chicano Radical militants like the Chicano Revolutionary Party and the Brown Berets also organized and began doing work in the Fruitvale District to protect the Chicano and Latino Community from police brutality and had a free breakfast program in the Fruitvale area with the help of the Black Panthers. On July 26, 1970, the Fruitvale District held the Chicano Moratorium against Chicanos going to fight in the Vietnam war. La Clinica de La Raza was also formed on Fruitvale Avenue in 1970, by Chicano students in order to have a free Clinic for the Chicano and Latino Community in East Oakland. La Raza Unida Party also had a chapter in Oakland. The Chicano movement was also part of Oakland's Radical History in the 60s and 70s.

== 1980s and 1990s ==
Starting in the Late 1960s and continuing into the early 1980s, the number of Latinos, mostly of Mexican origin, began to increase in Oakland, especially in the Fruitvale District. This district is one of the oldest in Oakland, growing up around the old Peralta estate (now a city park). It always had a concentration of Latino residents, businesses and institutions, and increased immigration, continuing into the 21st century, has added greater numbers in Fruitvale and throughout East Oakland.

As in many other American cities during the 1980s, crack cocaine became a serious problem in Oakland. Drug dealing in general, and the dealing of crack cocaine in particular, resulted in elevated rates of violent crime, causing Oakland to consistently be listed as one of America's most crime-ridden cities.

During the late 1980s and early 1990s, Oakland's black plurality reached its peak at approximately 47% of the overall population. Oakland was the birthplace or home at one time of several rap acts, including MC Hammer, Digital Underground, Hieroglyphics (including Souls of Mischief and Del tha Funkee Homosapien), The Luniz, Tupac Shakur, and Too Short. Outside of the rap genre, artists such as the Pointer Sisters, En Vogue, Tony! Toni! Tone!, and Billie Joe Armstrong of Green Day also emerged from Oakland (actually the members of Green Day hailed from suburban Pinole area).

On May 24, 1990, a pipe bomb placed underneath traveling eco-activist Judi Bari's car seat exploded, tearing through her backside and nearly killing her. The bomb was placed directly under the driver's seat, not in the back seat or luggage area as it presumably would have been if Bari had transported it knowingly. Immediately after the 1990 car bombing, while Bari was in Oakland's Highland Hospital, she and a friend were arrested on suspicion of knowingly transporting the bomb. The Alameda County district attorney later dropped the case for lack of evidence, and in 2004 the FBI and the City of Oakland agreed to a $4 million settlement of a lawsuit brought by Bari's estate, and her friend, over their false arrest.

On October 20, 1991, a massive firestorm (see 1991 Oakland firestorm) swept down from the Berkeley Hills above the Caldecott Tunnel. Twenty-five people were killed, and 150 people were injured, with nearly 4,000 homes destroyed. The economic losses have been estimated at $1.5 billion. The economic losses, in combination with injuries and loss of life, make this the worst urban firestorm in American history. Many of the original homes were rebuilt on a much larger scale.

In late 1996, Oakland was the center of a controversy surrounding Ebonics (African American Vernacular English), an ethnolect the outgoing Oakland Unified School District board voted to recognize on December 18. This was later dropped.

During the mid-1990s, Oakland experienced an improved economy compared to previous decades, with new downtown land development such as a $140 million state government center project, a $101 million city office building, and a 12-story office building for the University of California, Office of the President. The City Center redevelopment project was bought by Shorenstein Co., a San Francisco real estate firm. Office vacancies dropped to 11 percent from 16 percent in 1996. Officials at the Port of Oakland and Oakland International Airport, began multimillion-dollar expansion plans to keep pace with rival shipping ports and airports on the West Coast.

=== 1989 Loma Prieta earthquake ===
On October 17, 1989, a 6.9 magnitude earthquake struck the Bay Area at 5:04 p.m. The rupture was related to the San Andreas fault system and effected all Bay Area counties with a maximum Mercalli intensity of IX (Violent). Many structures in Oakland were badly damaged including the double-decker Cypress Street Viaduct in West Oakland that collapsed. The eastern span of the San Francisco–Oakland Bay Bridge also sustained damage and was closed to traffic for one month; the bridge reopened on November 18.

== 2000s ==
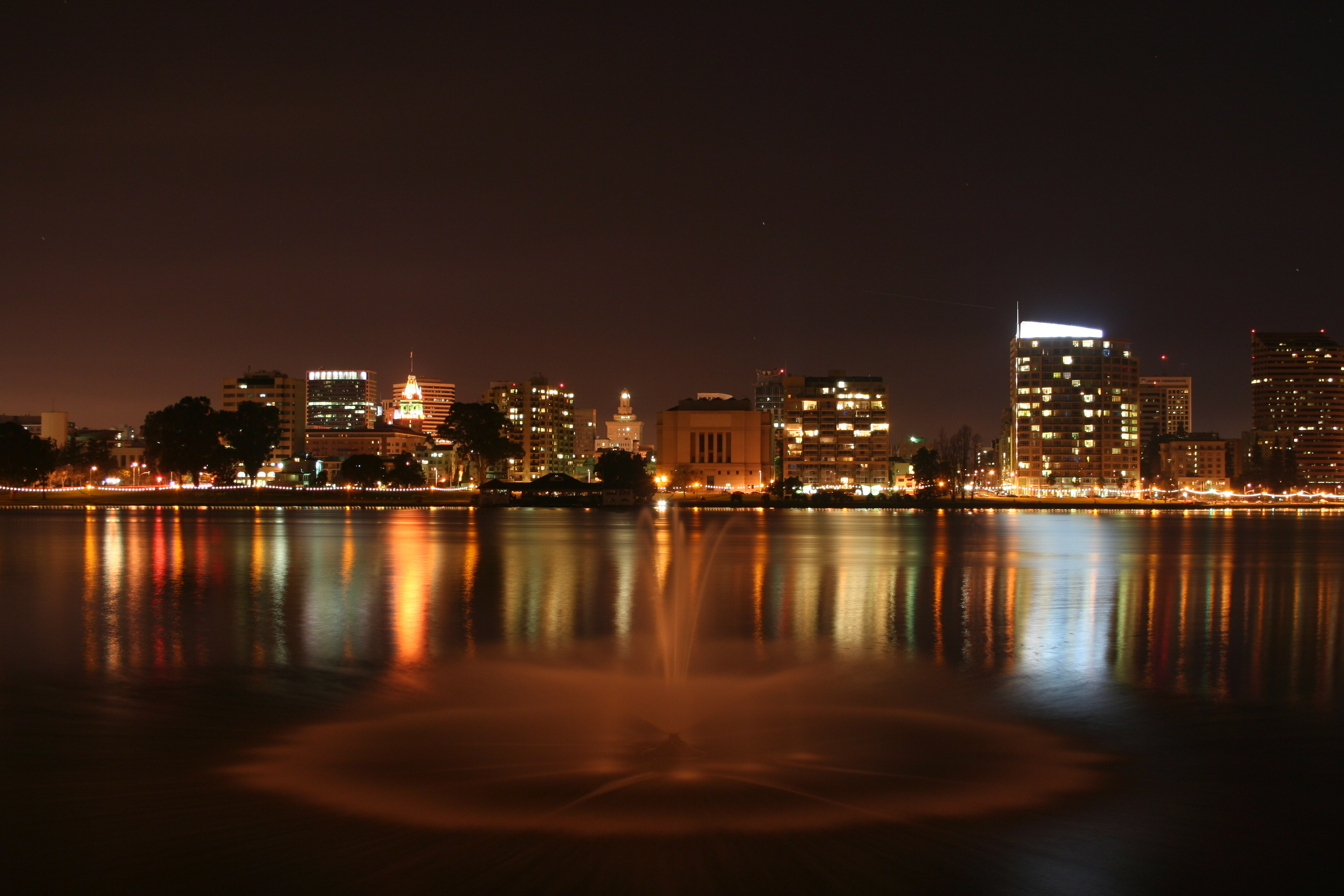
A night view of Oakland's downtown skyline and Lakeside Apartments District as seen from East 18th Street Pier

After his 1999 inauguration, Oakland Mayor Jerry Brown continued his predecessor Elihu Harris' public policy of supporting downtown housing development in the area defined as the Central Business District in Oakland's 1998 General Plan. Since Brown's stated goal was to add 10,000 residents to downtown Oakland, it became known as the "10K" plan. It resulted in redevelopment projects in the Jack London District, where Brown purchased and later sold an industrial warehouse, which he used as a personal residence, and in the Lakeside Apartments District near Lake Merritt, where two infill projects were approved. The 10K plan touched the historic Old Oakland district, the Chinatown district, the Uptown district, and downtown.

The 10K plan and other redevelopment projects were controversial due to potential rent increases and gentrification, which would displace lower-income residents from downtown Oakland into outlying neighborhoods and cities. Additional controversy over development proposals arose from the weakening of the Bay Area and national economy in 2000, 2001, 2007, and the credit crunch and the recession of 2008. These downturns resulted in lowered sales, rentals and occupancy of the new housing and slower growth and economic recovery than expected.

The Oakland Athletics have long sought a site to build a new baseball stadium. A deal announced in 2006 to build a new park in Fremont, to be called Cisco Field was halted three years later as a result of opposition from businesses and local residents. Local efforts have been put forth by both fans and city politicians to retain the A's, including three potential locations near downtown and the Oakland waterfront. The South Bay city of San Jose showed continuing, strong interest in becoming the team's new home, and was the preferred destination for then majority team owner Lew Wolff but was blocked by the San Francisco Giants. Currently plans call for a 34,000 seat new stadium dubbed Oakland Ballpark at Howard Terminal (owned by the Port of Oakland) next to Jack London Square.

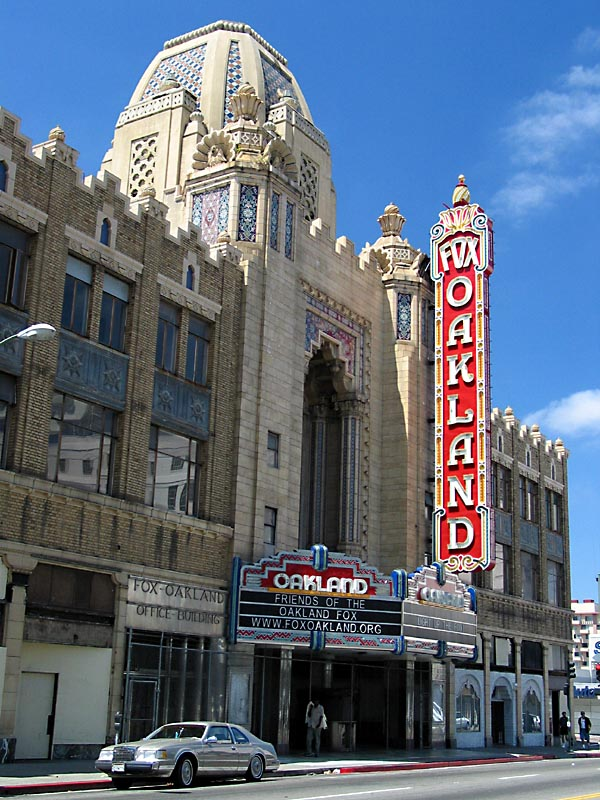
Fox Oakland Theatre, August 2002

The Oakland Ballet, performing in the city since 1965, folded temporarily in 2006 due to financial problems and the closure of their performance facility, the Calvin Simmons Theater at the Kaiser Convention Center. The following year, founder Ronn Guidi announced the revival of the Ballet under new director Graham Lustig, and the program continues to perform at the Laney College Theater.

In the early morning hours of January 1, 2009, unarmed civilian Oscar Grant was shot and killed by BART police officer Johannes Mehserle on a crowded platform at the Fruitvale BART Station in East Oakland. Officers had subdued and handcuffed an unarmed Grant in a prone position for allegedly resisting arrest, before Mehserle shot Grant in the back with his gun, which he claimed to have mistaken for his stun gun. In the ensuing week, demonstrations and riots took place in Downtown Oakland, with demonstrators citing police brutality and racial injustice as their motivation. Mehserle was convicted of involuntary manslaughter in July 2010, and sentenced to two years in prison. Both the verdict and sentencing set off further demonstrations in downtown Oakland, which included looting and destruction of property.

In February 2009, the Fox Oakland Theatre reopened. The theatre had been closed for most of the previous 42 years, with few events held there. After a thorough restoration, seismic retrofit, and many other improvements following years of severe neglect (including a fire as recently as 2004), the historic landmark theater started drawing patrons from all over the Bay Area.

On March 21, 2009, Oakland parolee Lovelle Mixon, 26, fatally shot four Oakland police officers, and wounded a fifth officer. At approximately 1:00 p.m., Mixon shot and killed two officers during a routine traffic stop. Mixon fled the scene, hiding in his sister's nearby apartment, and shortly after 3:00 p.m., he killed two more officers as they responded. During the ensuing shootout, the police killed Mixon in self-defense and a fifth officer was wounded. Three of the officers killed were ranking sergeants, the first time the Oakland Police Department had lost a sergeant in the line of duty. It was the single deadliest day for sworn personnel in the department's history, and also the deadliest attack on U.S. law enforcement since the September 11 attacks.

== 2010s–2020s ==
Due to misconduct by the Oakland Police Department, the City of Oakland has paid a total of $57 million during the 2001–2011 timeframe to victims of police abuse—the largest sum of any city in California.

On October 10, 2011, protesters and civic activists began "Occupy Oakland" demonstrations directed against national social and economic inequality at Frank H. Ogawa Plaza in Downtown Oakland. The demonstrators set up an encampment that, at one point, consisted of "a miniature city" of as many as 150 tents. At one point, a second encampment was established at Snow Park on Lake Merritt. Oakland Police raided and dismantled the two protest sites at Frank Ogawa Plaza and Snow Park early in the morning on October 25. Later the same day, in efforts to reestablish the encampments, protesters clashed with police. Two officers and three protesters were injured and more than a hundred people were arrested. On November 2, thousands marched upon and shut down the Port of Oakland. At least two Iraqi war veterans were injured in the demonstrations, by police action. By November 14, the encampment at the plaza in front of City Hall had been cleared, and it was announced by city officials the continued protests had cost the city $2.4 million. A January 28, 2012 attempt by Occupy Oakland protesters to overtake the vacant Henry J. Kaiser Convention Center resulted in hundreds of arrests by police, and that evening a break-in by vandals to Oakland City Hall resulted in damage to artwork and the building itself.

Throughout the 2010s, the city's Oakland Medical Center, the first HMO and first Kaiser Permanente hospital, underwent a $2 billion retrofit including numerous new buildings.

On April 2, 2012, seven people were killed in a mass shooting at Oikos University, located in East Oakland near the airport and Coliseum Complex. Suspect One L. Goh surrendered an hour later to police in Alameda. The shooting was considered the deadliest mass killing in the city's history.

In July 2013, after the acquittal of George Zimmerman in the Trayvon Martin Trials, there were protests. A small group of the protesters were organized in cities including San Francisco, Philadelphia, Chicago, Washington, D.C., and Atlanta.

On December 2, 2016, a fire at a Fruitvale District warehouse, which was hosting a music event, killed at least 36 people. It was the deadliest fire in the city's history.

Oakland teachers went on strike in February 2019.

Oakland suffered a disproportionate human toll from the COVID pandemic within the San Francisco Bay Area, and between 2019 and 2023, Oakland became the first city in U.S. history to lose three professional major league sports teams to other cities within a span of five years.

== See also ==
- Timeline of Oakland, California
- Timeline of the San Francisco Bay Area
