= Chabot =

Chabot is a surname of French origin. This surname may refer to:

== People ==
- André Chabot, politician in Calgary, Alberta, Canada
- Anthony Chabot (1813–1888), Canadian-American engineer and entrepreneur
- Arlette Chabot (born 1951), French journalist and political commentator
- Aurore Chabot (born 1949), American ceramist
- Bart Chabot (born 1954), Dutch poet and writer
- Benoît Chabot (1911–2006), independent member of the Canadian House of Commons
- Cécile Chabot (1907–1990), Canadian poet and illustrator
- Charles Chabot (1815–1882), English graphologist
- Christiane Chabot (born 1950), French-Canadian artist
- Denys Chabot (1945–2025), Canadian writer and journalist
- François Chabot (1756–1794), French revolutionist
- Frédéric Chabot (born 1968), Canadian former professional ice hockey goaltender
- Georges Antoine Chabot (1758–1819), French jurist and statesman
- Hendrikus Chabot (1894–1949), Dutch painter and sculptor
- Henri Chabot (1616–1655), French nobleman who became Duke of Rohan
- Herbert Chabot (1931–2022), senior judge of the United States Tax Court
- James Chabot (1927–1989), Canadian politician and British Columbia cabinet minister 1963–1986
- Jean Chabot (1806–1860), lawyer, judge and political figure in Canada East
- Jean-Baptiste Chabot (1860–1948), French Roman Catholic secular priest and Syriac scholar
- Jean-Philip Chabot (born 1988), Canadian professional ice hockey player
- Jesse Chabot, Canadian screenwriter
- John Chabot (born 1962), Canadian former professional ice hockey player
- John Léo Chabot (1869–1936), Canadian parliamentarian and surgeon
- Lorne Chabot (1900–1946), Canadian ice hockey goaltender
- Louis François Jean Chabot (1757–1837), French general of the Napoleonic Wars
- Philippe de Chabot (c.1492–1543), Admiral of France
- Steve Chabot (born 1953), member of the U.S. House of Representatives
- Thomas Chabot (born 1997), Canadian ice hockey defenceman

== Places ==
- Chabot Museum, Rotterdam, Netherlands, dedicated to the Dutch painter and sculptor Hendrik Chabot
- Chabot Park, neighborhood in Oakland, California
- Anthony Chabot Regional Park, California
- James Chabot Provincial Park, British Columbia, Canada
- Lake Chabot, man-made lake in Alameda County, California

== Organisations ==
- Chabot Space and Science Center, a public science center and planetarium in Oakland, California
- Chabot College, a public community college in Hayward, California
- Chabot Mobility, a mobility startup headquartered in Seoul, South Korea

== Other uses ==
- 12675 Chabot (1980 TA4), main-belt asteroid
- A sculpin (fish) of the genus Cottus, in the French language or in heraldic use (alternatively spelled chalbot in English)
