= Iron Horse Regional Trail =

Multi-use trail in East Bay, California

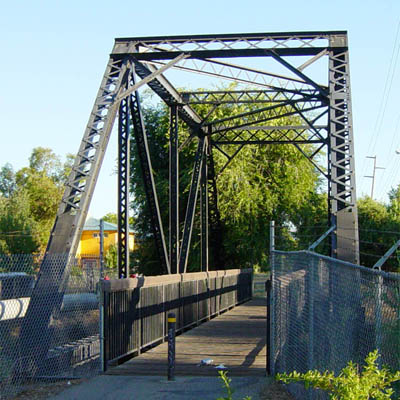
- A converted railroad bridge crossing Walnut Creek at the Concord-Pleasant Hill boundary
Trail map

The Iron Horse Regional Trail is a rail trail in the East Bay Area in California. This trail is located in inland central Alameda and Contra Costa counties, mostly following a Southern Pacific Railroad right of way established in 1891 and abandoned in 1977. The two counties purchased the right of way at that time, intending to use it as a transportation corridor; the Iron Horse Trail was first established in 1986. In 2003, BART proposed to also use the right-of-way for a DMU line from Walnut Creek station to Tracy via Pleasanton.

The trail passes through the cities of Pleasanton, Dublin, San Ramon, Danville, Alamo, Walnut Creek, Pleasant Hill and Concord. When completed, the trail will span from Livermore in central Alameda County to Suisun Bay at the northern edge of Contra Costa County, a distance of over 40 miles (64 km) connecting two counties and nine communities. The trail also directly connects to both the Dublin/Pleasanton and Pleasant Hill BART stations.

The trail is maintained by the East Bay Regional Park District. It is a wheelchair accessible paved trail along with adjacent unpaved or soft trails in certain areas.

The Iron Horse Regional Trail has several bridges over busy thoroughfares to help improve traffic flow; currently over Treat Boulevard in Contra Costa Centre, Ygnacio Valley Road in Walnut Creek, Bollinger Canyon Road in San Ramon, and Dublin Boulevard in Dublin. Additional bridges are in the planning process.

Despite initial skepticism, and even opposition, the trail is now a major transportation and recreation corridor. One million trips are made each year on the path.

== Pleasanton/Alameda County segments ==
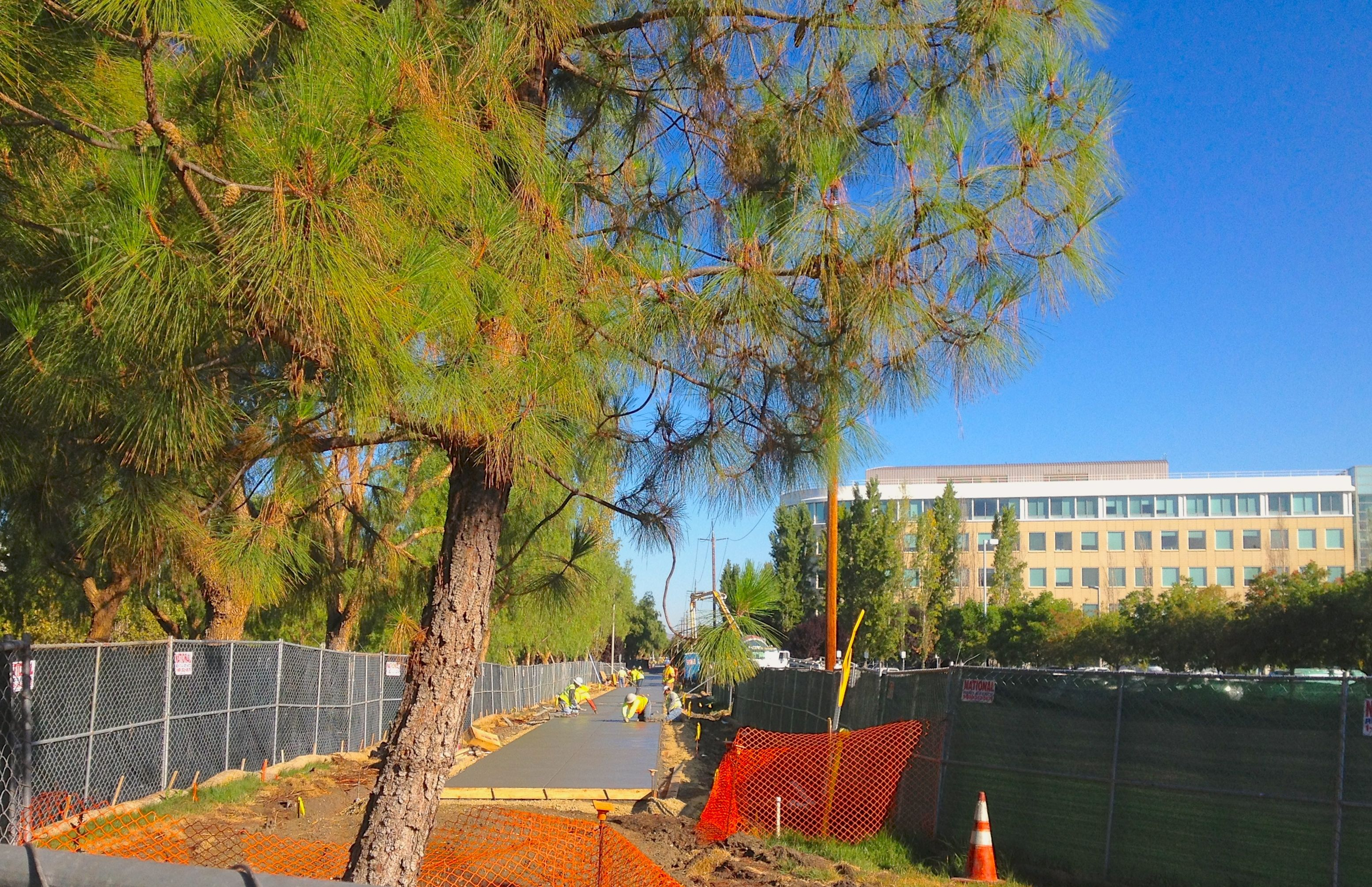
Construction of Iron Horse Regional Trail through Kaiser Permanente campus in Hacienda Business Park, July 2013

The city of Pleasanton initially chose not to preserve the transportation corridor within its city limits. Although the East Bay Regional Park District (EBRPD) still controlled the right of way, multiple developments were built encompassing the corridor, most notably Hacienda Business Park.

The first work on the trail in Pleasanton began in March 2006, creating a new section about 1 mile (1.6 km) long on the south side of the city. This segment opened in March 2008, leaving a gap in the trail extending approximately 1.6 miles (2.6 km) from the Dublin side of the Dublin/Pleasanton BART station to Santa Rita Road near the Stoneridge Drive intersection, where the new segment began.

In February 2011, the Pleasanton City Council voted to ratify the EBRPD master plan, based on public meetings held the previous year, to complete the trail within the city. $4 million in regional and federal grants was allocated to complete the BART-to-Santa Rita section of the trail. Construction began in May 2013, and was completed in July 2014. The project accommodated several obstacles, including routing through an existing business campus, two city parks, a residential development, an apartment complex, and three at-grade crossings of busy roads; it connects with the earlier southern segment at the intersection of two major streets.

In April 2013, another new trail segment opened along Stanley Boulevard on the north side of Shadow Cliffs Lake in unincorporated Alameda County. This leaves a .6 miles (0.97 km) gap between the end of the Pleasanton portion of the trail and the west end of this new segment. The East Pleasanton Specific Plan Project includes plans to complete this gap along future extensions to Busch Road and El Charro Road to Stanley Boulevard.

A 2022 project extended this segment from the Livermore city limits at the intersection of Stanley Boulevard and Isabel Avenue with a trail paralleling Stanley Avenue on its north side to a new bridge over Murrieta Boulevard; the trail dead-ends about .25 miles (0.40 km) past the bridge.
