= Vargas Plateau Regional Park =

Park in California, United States

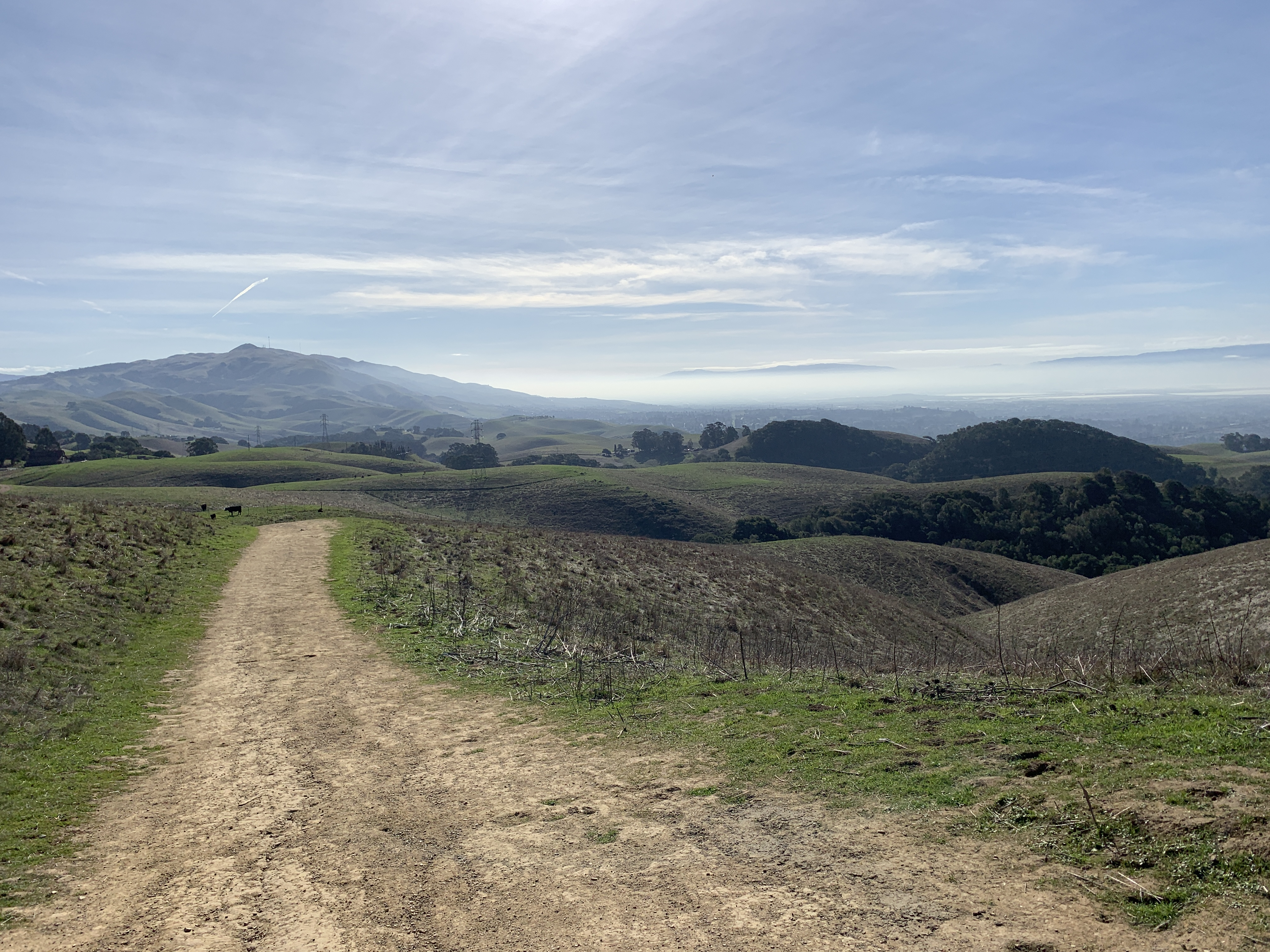
- Interactive map of Vargas Plateau Regional Park
- Location: Alameda County, California
- Nearest city: Fremont, California
- Coordinates: 37.582°N 121.943°W
- Area: 1,249 acres (505 ha)
- Created: 2010
- Operator: East Bay Regional Park District

Vargas Plateau Regional Park sits on a plateau in the Fremont Hills of Alameda County, California, United States, that overlooks the San Francisco Bay, Niles Canyon, and the cities of Fremont, Union City, and Newark. The elevation of the park is about 1,000 feet (300 m), making it an important link with nearby ridge-top parks such as Garin Regional Park, Pleasanton Ridge Regional Park, Mission Peak Regional Preserve, and Sunol Regional Wilderness.

== History ==
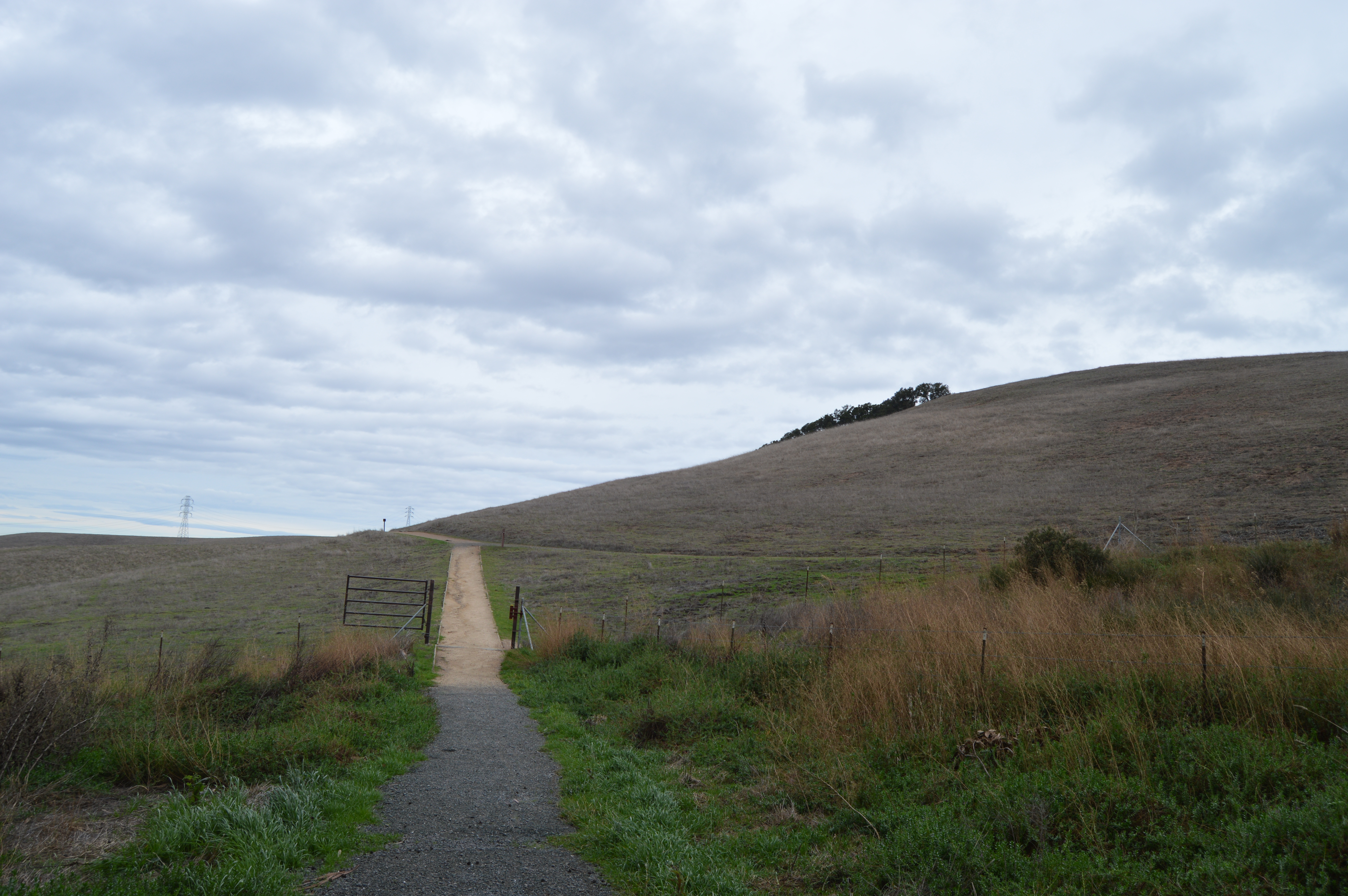
December 2023

Vargas Plateau once was part of the homeland of two Ohlone-speaking tribes, the Tuibun and Causen, who used the area for hunting and farming. After the Spanish took control of California, the two tribes began living and working at Mission San Jose in 1797. After the mission was secularized, the land was granted to Juan Bautista Alvarado and Andres Pico in 1846. (Note: Secularization of mission properties occurred after the Mexican Revolution.) The native people essentially became serfs under this arrangement, losing any claim to the Vargas Plateau.

After California became an American state in 1850, many of the old land grants were declared void by American courts. Such was the case with the Alvarado and Pico properties, and the land eventually became part of a horse breeding ranch, which was subdivided in about 1900. In 1909, Antonio Francisco Vargas bought 444 acres (180 ha) of the "lower ranch" and by 1912, Antonio's brother Manuel and nephew Edward bought 550 acres (220 ha) of the "upper ranch". Manuel and Edward used their land for sheep and cattle ranching, as well as for dryland farming. The Tavares family inherited the upper ranch after Edward Vargas died in 1978. Antonio's direct descendants continued raising cattle on the lower ranch until the land was sold to the East Bay Regional Park District (EBRPD) in 1993. EBRPD bought the Tavares' property in 1996. The District acquired what was known as the Rose and Comcast properties in 2010 so the total area of the newly designated Vargas Plateau Regional Park came to 1,249 acres (505 ha).

Around 1995, EBRPD acquired 1,200 acres (490 ha) of the Vargas Plateau in Fremont, with 1.5 miles (2.4 km) of the Bay Area Ridge Trail and 3 miles (4.8 km) of other trails. Subsequently, park use was pushed back. As of 2007, the opening was expected by 2010. In 2010, EBRPD directors were expecting it would open soon. In 2011, EBRPD put the start in 2012. As of January 2015, EBRPD pointed to late 2015; while as of May 2015, the district pointed to spring 2016.

A 2012 settlement agreement between EBRPD and the owners of two large nearby ranches required the construction of improvements to park access roads. EBRPD and the city of Fremont agreed in 2013 to undertake them jointly, using $260,000 of funding by EBRPD and performed by the city. The park opened on May 5, 2016.

The park was closed by a court-issued preliminary injunction on July 13, 2016. The court found that the park district “did not complete the improvements required by the settlement agreement prior to opening,” which had “very specific road widening requirements.” The order applied to access by motor vehicles, as well as to access by non-motorized users for hiking, bicycling and horse riding, with immediate effect. “The park could remain closed for months or years,” until the improvements are completed.

On May 2, 2017, EBRPD announced that it had settled the lawsuit, and that the park would reopen on May 15, 2017. EBRPD said that it agreed to construct a paved shoulder along Vargas Road, and a vehicle turnaround on the upper part of Morrison Canyon Road. It also announced that the City of Fremont had agreed to contribute part of the necessary funds. (Note: Widening of Vargas Road had already been completed before the settlement was published.) In October 2025, the county decided that they no longer wanted to maintain Morrison Canyon Road and gave that responsibility over 0.2-mile section to the adjacent owner who erected a gate blocking public access.

== Wildlife ==
The park contains an array of habitats, such as grassland, seasonal wetlands, stock ponds, perennial and ephemeral drainages, northern coastal scrublands and oak woodlands, with some low rock outcrops. The steep slopes of the plateau has protected the native wildlife species and from exposure to human development. The result is that several species that are considered threatened or endangered elsewhere in the state may be found here. These include the threatened California red-legged frog, the Alameda whipsnake, and the federally threatened California tiger salamander. Other reptiles include the Pacific gopher snake and the Northern Pacific rattlesnake. Bird species living here include red-tailed hawks, Cooper's hawk, great-horned owls, pygmy owls, and wild turkeys.

== Activities ==
Hiking, biking and horseback riding are the most popular activities. Observation of birds and other wildlife can also be enjoyed from the trails.

== Facilities ==
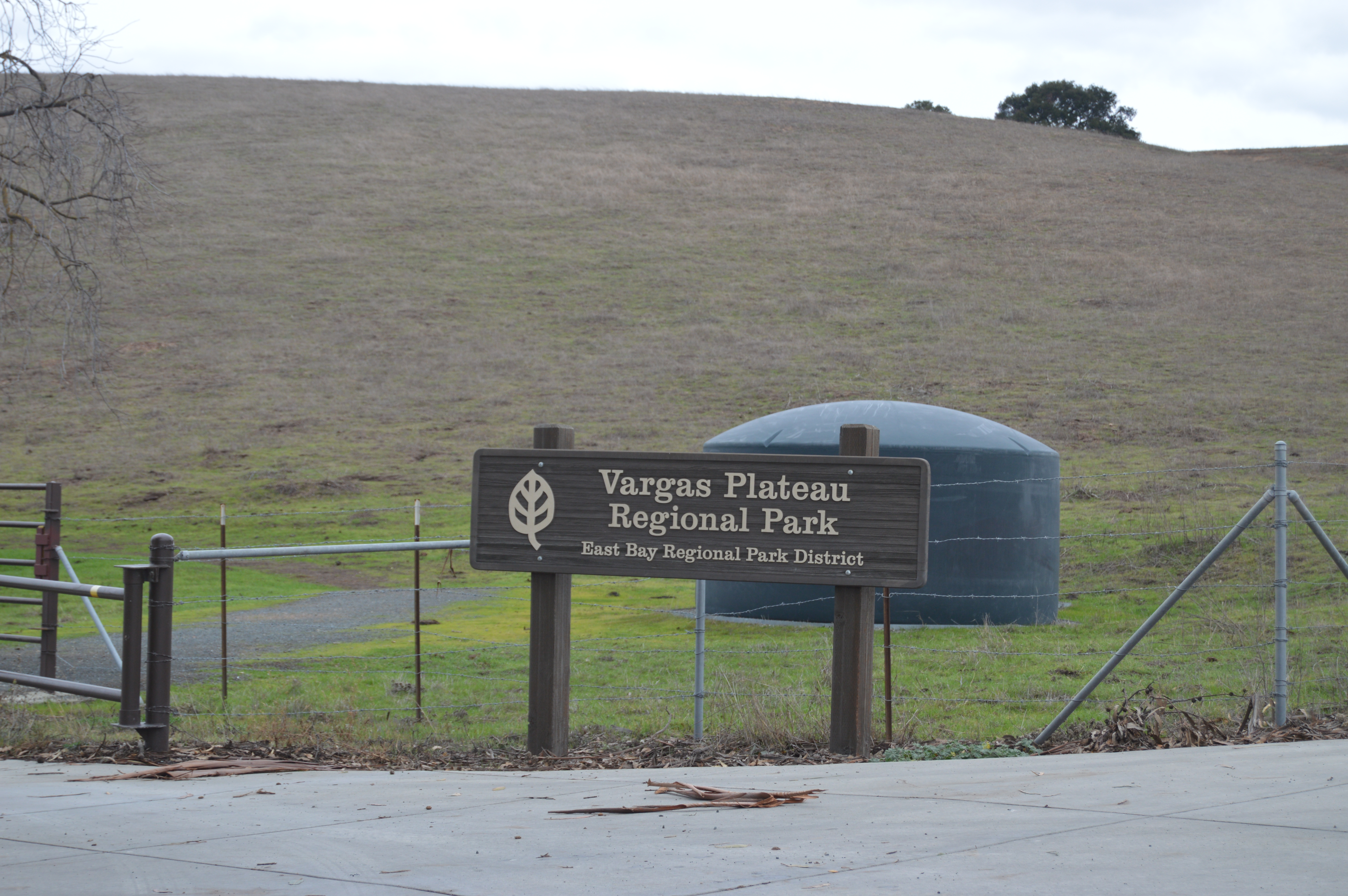
Park welcome sign

The park is relatively new and few facilities or conveniences are available. About 6 miles (9.7 km) of hiking/biking/equestrian trails have been built. However, the topography is rugged, making the trails generally unsuitable for most wheel chairs. There is a trailhead with a restroom and a wayside panel, but no drinking water. Potential visitors should be aware that car parking is very limited at the trailhead inside the park, and no street parking is allowed. There are no campsites or picnic grounds.
