= Water King =

Water King can refer to:

- Anthony Chabot (1813–1888), American businessman
- Arkos Balkar, fictional son of the Supreme Lord in the Japanese web manga Centuria
- Water King, part of the Luck League in the DC Comics fictional universe

== See also ==
- Inkayacu, genus of extinct penguins named after a Quechua-language phrase meaning "king of the water"
