= Ridgelands Regional Park =

Planned park in California, USA

Coordinates: 37°36′51.92″N 121°52′54.34″W

Ridgelands Regional Park is a future regional park to be developed in Pleasanton, CA by the East Bay Regional Park District. The concept is expected to be developed over many years; the core has already been put in place as the Pleasanton Ridge Regional Park, a 5,200-acre (21 km^{2}) park west of Pleasanton and north of Sunol, that overlooks Pleasanton and the Livermore Valley from the west.
