= Doolan Canyon =

Canyon in California, United States

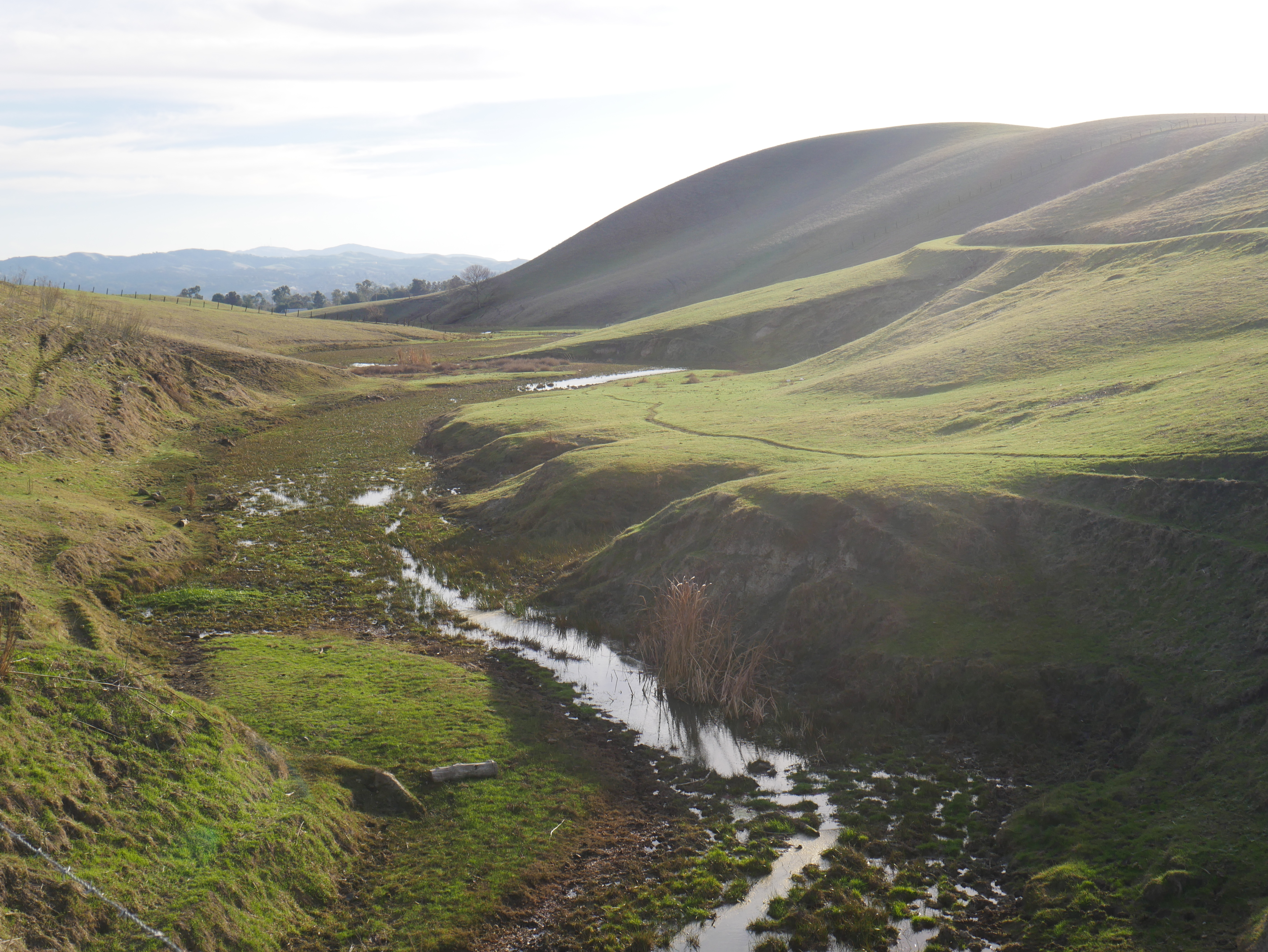
- Doolan Canyon, looking south towards Livermore and Dublin

- Location within California
- Floor elevation: approx. 436 feet (100 m)

Geography
- Location: Alameda County, California, United States
- Coordinates: 37°42′18″N 121°49′27″W
- Interactive map of Doolan Canyon

Doolan Canyon is a canyon in Alameda County, California, northwest of Livermore.

== Geography ==
It is located east of Tassajara Road, and south of the Contra Costa County border. Cottonwood Creek flows through Doolan Canyon.

== Nature ==
Doolan Canyon has high amounts of Tufa and Alkaline water.

Loggerhead shrikes, a species of bird, have been found around the area.

East Bay Regional Park District says that the Doolan Canyon area is habitat for the endangered species Alameda whip snake and red-legged frog. It also supports other "special status" species and some rare alkali soil plants.

== History ==
On May 24, 2007, Livermore and Dublin announced a plan to preserve the canyon.

On March 4, 2019, the valley was given 160 more acres of land.
