= Old Survivor =

Last living old-growth coastal redwood in the Berkeley Hills of California

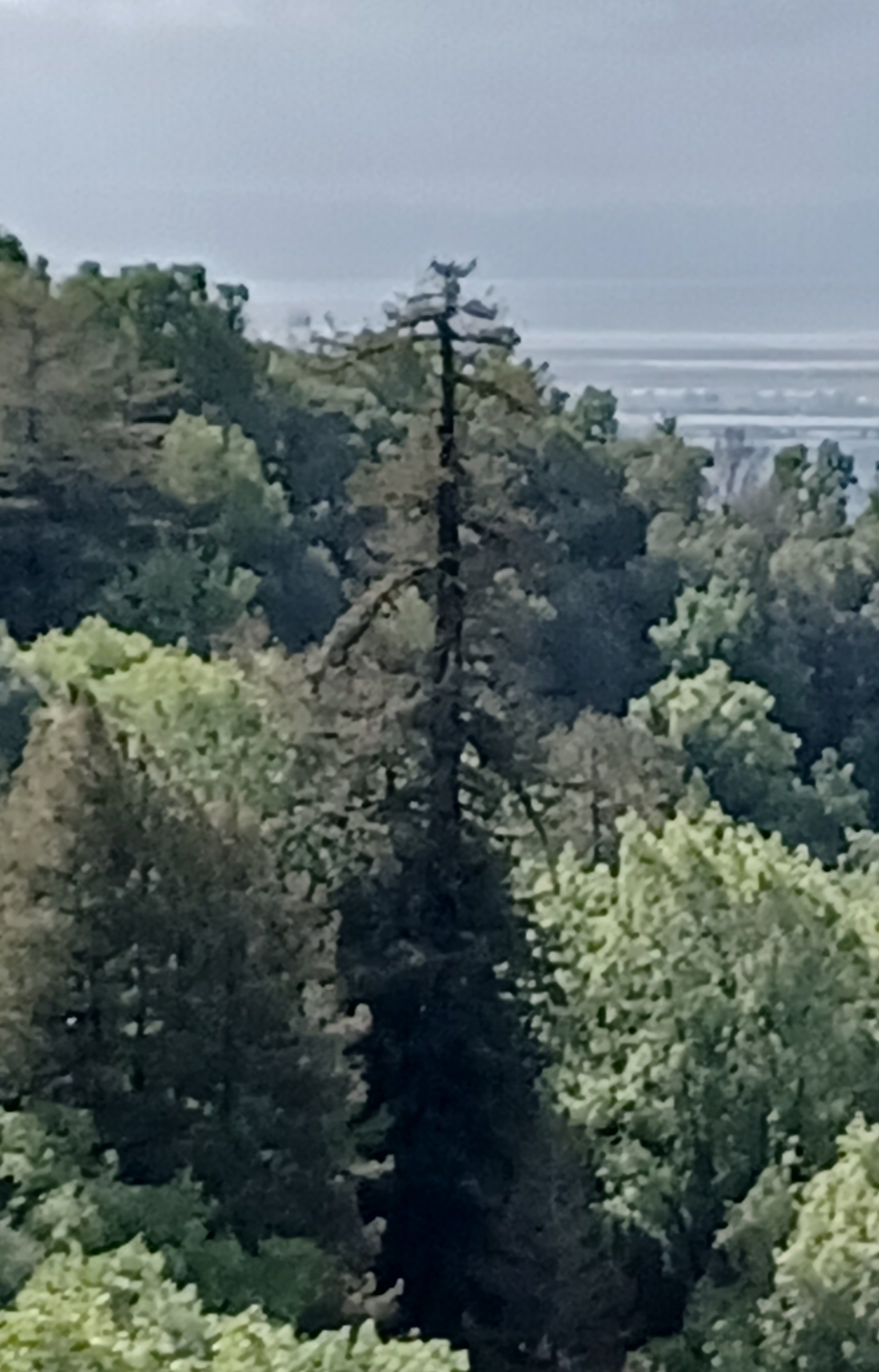

- Location within California
- Species: Coast redwood (Sequoia sempervirens)
- Coordinates: 37°47′34″N 122°10′29″W
- Height: 250 ft (76 m)
- Diameter: 26 ft (7.9 m)
- Date seeded: 1549-1554

Old Survivor, also known as the Grandfather Tree, is the last remaining old-growth coastal redwood of the East Bay Redwoods that once populated the Oakland Hills in California.

== Description ==
Old Survivor has a unique shaggy appearance with several large branches drooping outward from its sparse upper crown. The tree is much taller than the surrounding trees, all of which are second growth. Despite its name, the tree, which dates to 1549–1554, is actually young for an old-growth coastal redwood, many of which live between 1200 and 1800 years old or more. Between 7-12 years before Old Survivor was seeded, Spanish/Portuguese explorer Juan Rodríguez Cabrillo had led the first expedition to explore the coast of what is now California.

The tree can be observed at a distance from the York Trail of Leona Heights Park, or from the parking lot of Carl B. Munck Elementary School where there is a plaque detailing the tree's statistics and history.

== History ==
From 1845 to 1860, logging of the coastal redwoods in the area for their valuable timber wiped out much of the dense coastal redwood forest that once populated the Oakland Hills of East Bay. A second wave of logging following the 1906 San Francisco earthquake further contributed to the forest's destruction, leaving only a few scattered pockets of old-growth redwoods left in the entirety of East Bay. Old Survivor's location on an exceptionally steep and rocky slope beside Horseshoe Creek made it unprofitable to log, and thus the tree was spared the fate of its neighbors.

In 1916, the land where the tree stands was purchased by the city of Oakland in order to preserve the remaining redwoods in the area.

The tree was rediscovered in 1969 by Oakland Parks naturalist Paul Covel in what was then McCrea Memorial Park (today called Leona Heights Park). A core ring count at the time made by Glen Strouse at Humboldt State University estimated the tree's age to be between 415 and 420 years old relative to 1969.

Old Survivor was designated a City of Oakland Historic Landmark on June 24, 1980.

In 2018, the documentary film Old Survivor celebrated the tree and reflected back on the history of Oakland's coastal redwood forests.

== See also ==
- List of individual trees
- Redwood Regional Park
- East Bay Regional Park District
