= Tassajara Creek Regional Park =

Park in California, United States

- Location within California
- Location: Alameda County, California
- Nearest city: Dublin, California
- Coordinates: 37°43′24″N 121°52′24″W
- Area: 27 acres (11 ha)
- Created: 1991
- Operator: East Bay Regional Park District

Tassajara Creek Regional Park (TCRP) is a park near Dublin in the U.S. state of California, which has been called one of the most obscure parks in the East Bay Regional Park System. It is located adjacent to the eastern boundary of Camp Parks and was established in 1991 as a staging facility for the Tassajara Creek Regional Trail. Because of TCRP's small size—27 acres (11 ha)—and the existence of a security fence along the Camp Parks boundary, usage of the park by both humans and wildlife is limited.

Amenities are minimal. There is just one picnic table and one short hiking trail, but the venue is rarely crowded. One writer opined that TCRP filled a worthwhile niche in the park district's offerings, saying that "this is a very friendly spot for young children and puppies to experience a first hike".
