= Contra Loma Regional Park =

Regional park in California, United States

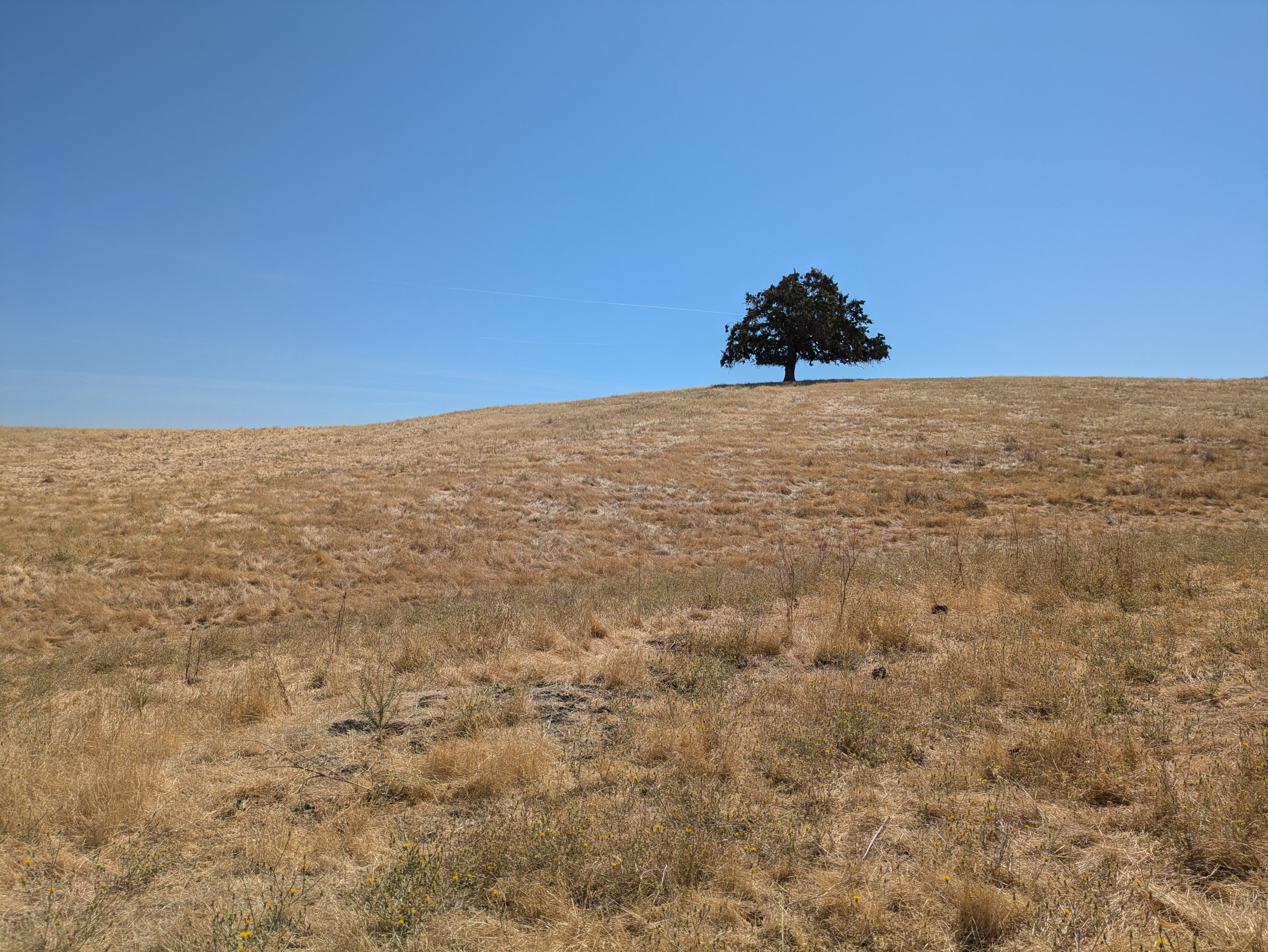
- Interactive map of Contra Loma Regional Park
- Nearest city: Antioch, California
- Coordinates: 37°58′22.3″N 121°49′18″W
- Area: 780 acres (320 ha)
- Operator: East Bay Regional Park District

Contra Loma Regional Park is a 780-acre (320 ha) regional park in Contra Costa County, California. It is part of the East Bay Regional Parks system. It is located in the city of Antioch and includes an 80-acre (32 ha) reservoir.

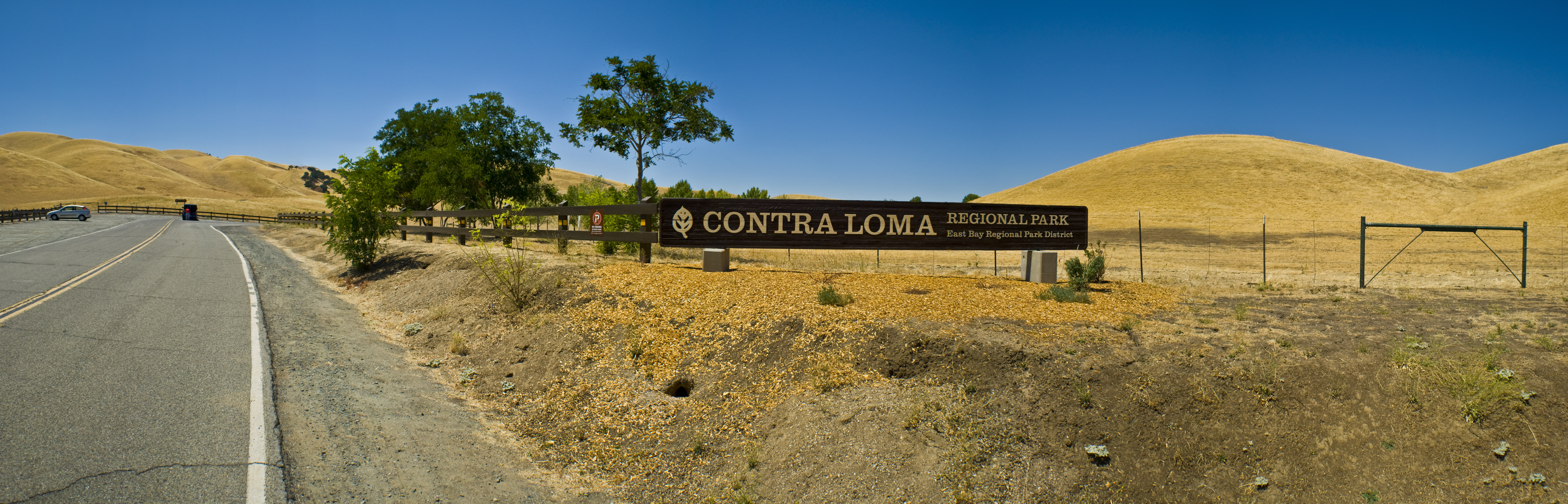
View of Contra Loma Regional Park

The U.S. Bureau of Reclamation is updating its long-term plan for the Contra Loma Regional Park and the adjacent Antioch Community Park. The previous plan was written in 1975, before a population boom hit eastern Contra Costa County.

The reservoir, which is owned by the Contra Costa Water District (CCWD), is available for year-round fishing and a lifeguarded swim lagoon for summertime swimming. Fishing is allowed, but those who wish to fish must purchase a Daily Fishing Access Permit. There is also an access fee. The reservoir contains catfish, black and striped bass, bluegill, trout, and redear sunfish.

Biking is allowed. Alcoholic drinks are prohibited everywhere in the park.
