= Lake Chabot =

Man-made lake in California, United States

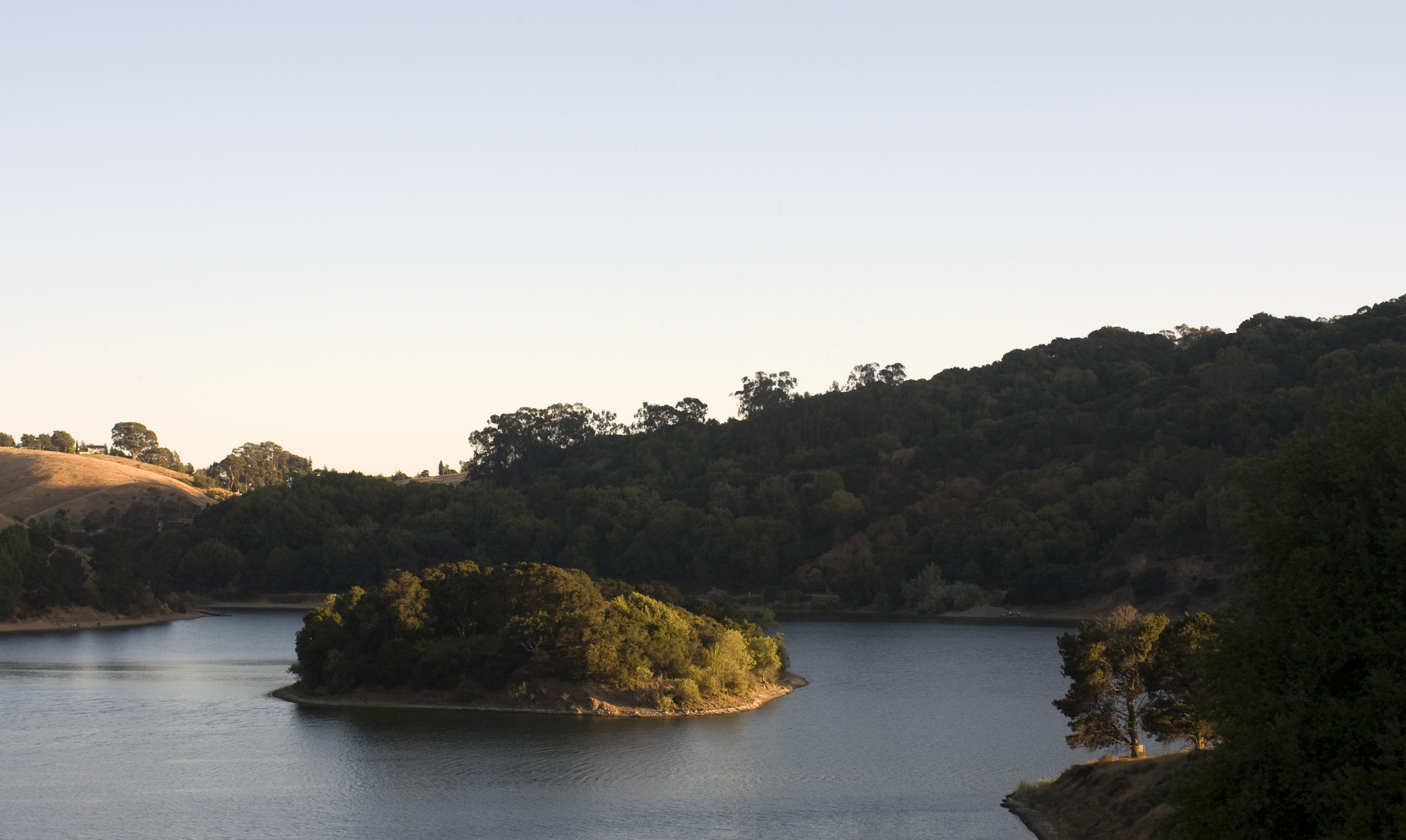

- Location within California Location within San Francisco Bay Area Location within the United States
- Location: Alameda County, California, United States
- Coordinates: 37°43′47″N 122°7′18″W
- Type: Reservoir
- Primary inflows: San Leandro Creek
- Primary outflows: San Leandro Creek
- Basin countries: United States
- Surface area: 315 acres (127 ha)
- Surface elevation: 243 ft (74 m)
- Islands: 1
- Settlements: Oakland, California

Lake Chabot (/ʃəˈboʊ/) is a man-made lake covering 317 acres (1.3 km^{2}) in Alameda County, California, United States. Part of the lake lies within Oakland city limits, but most of it lies in unincorporated Castro Valley, just east of San Leandro. It was formed by the damming of San Leandro Creek. The lake was completed in 1875 to serve as a primary source of water for the East Bay.

The California Office of Environmental Health Hazard Assessment (OEHHA) has developed a safe eating advisory for Lake Chabot based on levels of mercury found in fish caught here.

== History ==
The Lake Chabot dam was built in 1874–1875 as a primary source for water in the East Bay. At that time, the dam and reservoir were known simply as the San Leandro Reservoir. It was renamed Lower San Leandro Reservoir when another dam was built on the same creek upstream of the original lake, creating Upper San Leandro Reservoir. Chabot Dam was designated as a California Historic Civil Engineering Landmark by the American Society of Civil Engineers in 1976.

== Description ==
Lake Chabot was closed to recreation for 91 years. Legislation passed in the 1960s opened the lake for controlled recreation uses. Currently, the lake serves as a standby emergency water supply. For this reason, visitors are asked to observe certain necessary regulations to keep the waters pure. There are also blooms of toxic blue-green algae in the lake during the summer and fall that make contact with the water dangerous.

Anthony Chabot Regional Park and Lake Chabot Regional Park offer a number of activities including family and group camping, hiking, equestrian trails, bicycle trails, nature study, picnicking, golf, fishing, boat rental, a marina, a restaurant and boat tours of the lake.

== Impact ==
Aside from sedimentation caused by normal earth-fill dam construction, much of the dam's clay core and soil overburden were washed away in a storm during construction in 1874, resulting in the formation of Arrowhead Marsh in San Leandro Bay, at the mouth of San Leandro Creek near the Oakland International Airport. Coastal surveys show the marsh appearing sometime between 1855 and 1895, though logging of the San Antonio Forest may have also played a role.

Today, Arrowhead Marsh is one of the last remaining wetlands in the East Bay, and part of Martin Luther King Jr. Regional Shoreline, while nearly all of the surrounding historic marsh has been covered with industrial development.

== See also ==
- List of lakes in California
- List of lakes in the San Francisco Bay Area
- List of dams and reservoirs in California
