= Arrowhead Marsh =

Wetland in Oakland, California, United States

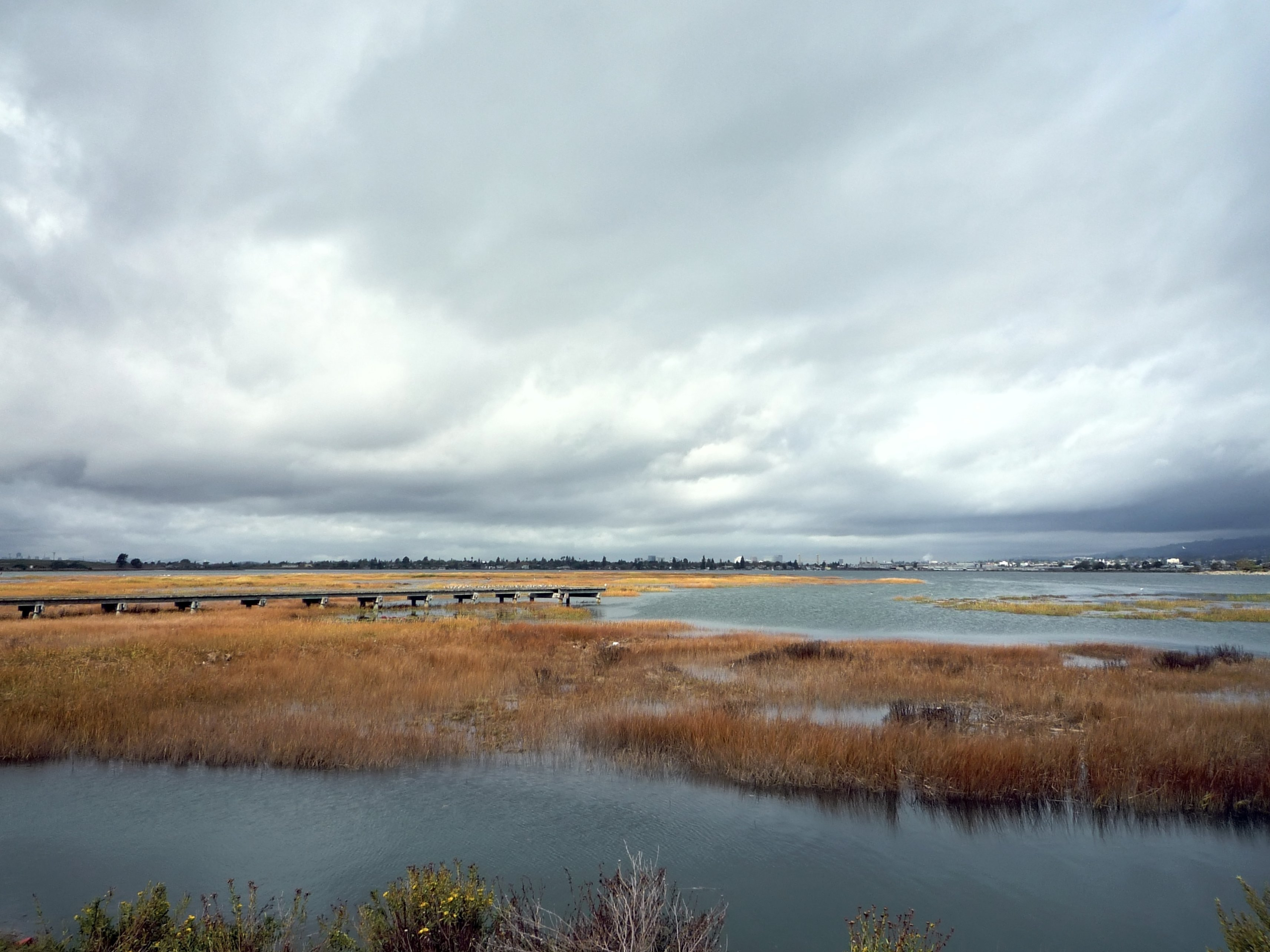
Arrowhead Marsh

Arrowhead Marsh is a wetlands habitat made of tidal mud flats in Martin Luther King, Jr. Shoreline in Oakland, California. It is an important stop on the Pacific flyway and is habitat for important endangered species especially the Salt Marsh Harvest Mouse.

37.7443736°N 122.2138567°W

== See also ==
- Damon Marsh
