= Sycamore Valley Regional Open Space Preserve =

- Interactive map of Sycamore Valley Regional Open Space Preserve
- Location: Contra Costa County, California
- Nearest city: Danville, California
- Coordinates: 37.81195°N 121.93935°W
- Area: 696 acres (2.82 km^{2})
- Created: September 2005
- Operator: East Bay Regional Park District

Sycamore Valley Regional Open Space Preserve is a regional park in Contra Costa County, California, outside of Danville, California, United States that is part of the East Bay Regional Parks (EBRPD) system.

== History ==
Sycamore Valley preserve began when the EBRPD acquired 328 acres (1.33 km^{2}) south of Camino Tassajara in 1989, naming it the Sherburn Hills unit. Ten years later, the district obtained 255 acres (1.03 km^{2}) north of Camino Tassajara from the Town of Danville, plus 106 acres (0.43 km^{2}) from Wood Ranch developers. The result was a 361 acres (1.46 km^{2}) tract named the Short Ridge unit. These two names are still used to designate the southern and northern parts of the preserve, respectively. Other small acquisitions have brought the preserve to its present size of 696 acres (2.82 km^{2}).

In the 1980s, the Town of Danville developed the Sycamore Valley Specific Plan to protect open space on the ridge lines south of Mount Diablo to be saved. The plan specified the following goals:

- Maintain the open grasslands as working ranch land;
- Provide trails for public recreation;
- Minimize wildfire risks to neighboring homes;
- Conserve the native wildlife.

The park officially opened to the public on September 25, 2005.
