= Oyster Bay Regional Shoreline =

Park in San Leandro, California

Coordinates: 37.709821°N 122.19274°W

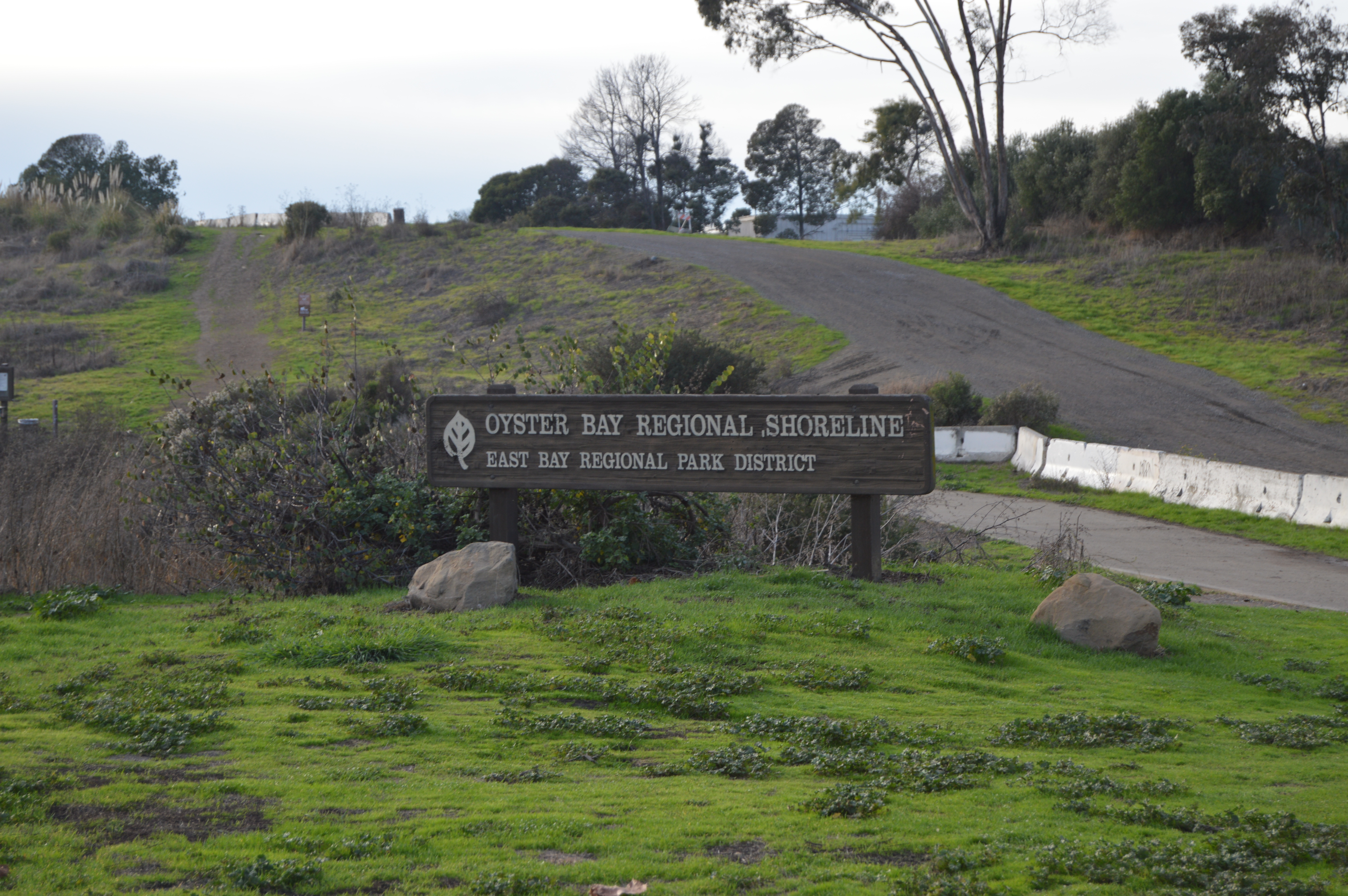
- Interactive map of Oyster Bay Regional Shoreline
- Type: Regional Shoreline
- Location: Alameda County, California
- Nearest city: San Leandro, California
- Area: 157 acres (0.64 km^{2})
- Created: 1980
- Operator: East Bay Regional Park District

Oyster Bay Regional Shoreline is a park in San Leandro, California, part of the East Bay Regional Park District (EBRPD). It is located along the eastern shore of San Francisco Bay directly to the south of Oakland International Airport. The property was originally used as a landfill for 37 years, until it was filled to capacity in 1977, when it was capped with a clay cover. EBRPD bought the property in 1980, intending to use it as a park.

== History ==
The property now known as Oyster Bay Regional Shoreline was originally used as a landfill, but that operation closed in 1977. EBRPD bought the site in the early 1980s, intending to someday develop it into a park. (Note: Writer Gail Todd states that the Oyster Bay landfill reached its capacity in 1977, and was then sealed with a clay cap. She adds that EBRPD bought and dedicated the site as a park in 1980.) Since then, the park district has imported clean soil to ensure that the former landfill would meet the requirements for adequate cap and surface drainage to minimize infiltration. Having done this, EBRPD has allowed passive recreational activities (such as "...dog walking, hiking, and picnicking while converting the site into parkland for the future development of active recreation areas such as disc golf and bicycle skills, and to provide parking within the park").

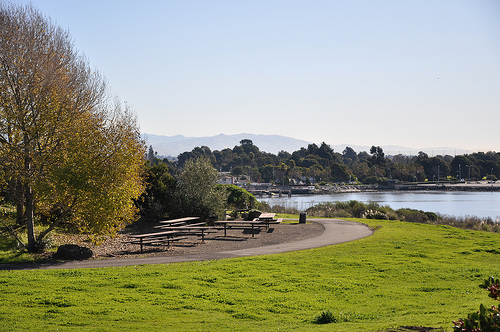
San Leandro Oyster Bay Homes

EBRPD's directors approved the Land Use Plan Amendment (LUPA) adopted the Mitigated Negative Declaration (MND) for Oyster Bay Regional Shoreline on December 17, 2013. LUPA guides, "... the future development of Oyster Bay Regional Shoreline including a new primary access and parking, formalization of the trail system, resource management, a bicycle skills area, a disc golf course, and a dedicated off-leash dog area. The MND analyzed the potentially significant environmental impacts that could result from implementation of the LUPA and adopted mitigation measures to ensure that environmental impacts remain at a less than significant level.

== General description ==
The main entrance to the park was at the end of Neptune Boulevard, off of Marina Boulevard. As of 2014, EBRPD had begun construction of a second park entrance on Davis Street.

There are seven non-reservable picnic areas along the multipurpose interior trails. The interior trails lead to a viewing site near the middle of the park that is marked by a sculpture named "Rising Wave. (Note: "Rising Wave" was created by sculptor, Roger Berry.) The 2 miles (3.2 km) long San Francisco Bay Trail is paved from the Neptune Drive entrance to the Bill Lockyer bridge. Dogs must be leashed on paved trails (which applies to a segment of the Bay Area Trail and a nature walk), while unleashed dogs are allowed to use only unimproved and unpaved trails.

Oyster Bay Regional Shoreline Loop is a 4.6 miles (7.4 km) long trail in the park that can be used by dogs. It is rated good for all skill levels, and even has a water fountain along the route that also is accessible by dogs.

The park contains the Oyster Bay Disc Golf course. This is an 18 hole course with two tee pads and two baskets, plus an alternate base to allow baskets to be moved, for every hole. The course provides unique views of San Francisco Bay and the city of San Francisco.

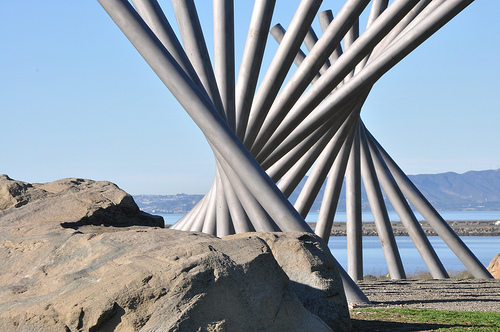
San Leandro Oyster Bay

== See also ==
- "2016 Opportunity Fill for Development of the Land Use Plan Amendment." Oyster Bay Regional Shoreline.
- San Leandro Oyster Beds
- Interpretive brochure.
