= Waterbird Regional Preserve =

Regional park, Contra Costa County, California,

Coordinates: 38.02528°N 122.09804°W

- Interactive map of Waterbird Regional Preserve
- Location: Contra Costa County, California
- Nearest city: Martinez, California
- Area: 198 acres (0.80 km^{2})
- Created: 1992
- Operator: East Bay Regional Park District

Waterbird Regional Preserve is a 192 acres (0.78 km^{2}) regional park located in Contra Costa County, California, adjacent to the city of Martinez. It is part of the East Bay Regional Park District (EBRPD). It primarily consists of an area known as McNabney Marsh, (Note: McNabney Marsh was named for a former leader of the East Bay Audubon Society.) which lies alongside Interstate 680 near the Sacramento-San Joaquin Delta and between two large and active oil refineries. The marsh drains into Suisun Bay via Peyton Slough. The area provides habitat for a wide variety of waterfowl and shorebirds for resting and feeding.

== History ==
McNabney Marsh existed here before the area was visited by European explorers and missionaries in the early 1800s. A group of about 200 indigenous people known as Chupcans lived around the marsh and its related uplands. (Note: Chupcans are a subset of the Bay Miwok.)

A major railroad line was constructed through this area in the 1880s. Two chemical companies, Peyton Chemical Company and the Mountain Copper Company, to build plants at the mouth of Peyton Slough. An upland area on the eastern border of the marsh was covered with eucalyptus and pepperwood trees, which provided the wood to build workers' houses. The pepperwoods line an old road running through the area.

In 1988, an oil spill contaminated many wetlands in this area, including McNabney Marsh. After the initial cleanup, a $10 million Natural Cleanup Fund was established to "...restore, rehabilitate and acquire the equivalent of the natural resources damaged by the oil spill." This fund helped EBRPD acquire 198 acres (0.80 km^{2}) of the south end of the marsh, including uplands east of the marsh.

== Site description ==
According to the EBRPD Land Use Plan, there are two owners of McNabney Marsh. EBRPD owns 48 acres (190,000 m^{2}) of the southern end, and Mountain View Sanitary District (MVSD) owns 68 acres (280,000 m^{2}) of the northern end. The marsh and uplands are bounded by Interstate 680, Waterfront Road, Waterbird Way, and Arthur Road. The park area is composed of the following distinct areas:

- Marsh 46 acres
- Transition zone 29 acres
- Grass upland 23 acres
- Ungrazed land 4 acres
- Disconnected parcels 9 acres

== Wildlife observation ==
Many species of birds use the marsh. Some of the commonly-seen include the American coot, mallard, green-winged teal, black-necked stilt, bufflehead, Canada goose, cinnamon teal, and white pelican. Other common birds seen at the Preserve include the barn swallow, black phoebe, Brewer's blackbird, cliff swallow, European starling, Say's phoebe, house finch and house sparrow. More rarely, a lucky Park visitor may see the white-tailed kite, northern harrier, golden eagle, osprey, and peregrine falcon.

The uplands are home to small mammals, especially ground squirrels and pocket gophers.

Dogs are not allowed in the refuge, because of the fragility of the ecosystem. This is also to protect feeding and breeding waterbirds from being disturbed. Fishing is not allowed in the Preserve. Water contact by humans or their pets is prohibited.
