= Anthony Chabot =

American businessman known as the "Water King"

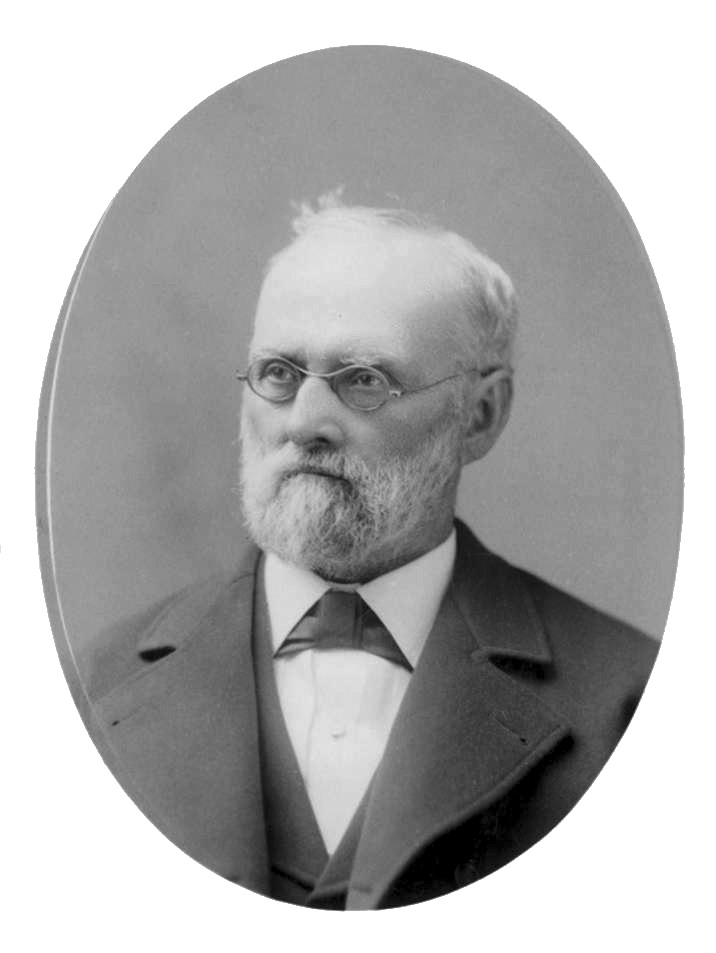
- Anthony Chabot
- Born: 13 August 1813; Saint-Hyacinthe, Quebec, Canada
- Died: 6 January 1888 (aged 74); Oakland, California
- Occupations: businessman and entrepreneur

Anthony Chabot, born Antoine Chabot, (/ʃəˈboʊ/; August 13, 1813 – January 6, 1888, La Présentation (Saint-Hyacinthe) QC Canada) was a nineteenth-century businessman and entrepreneur, notable for his contribution to developing hydraulic mining and for building water systems, especially in the Bay Area, so much that he became known as the "Water King".

== Biography ==
Chabot was raised on a farm in La Presentation, near Saint-Hyacinthe, Quebec, Canada. He was one of sixteen children and the son of a farmer. When he was sixteen years old, he left home, eventually settling in California in 1849.

He began working in the mining industry in Nevada City, building ditches to supply the mines with water. In 1852 and 1853 he and Edward Matteson devised the first hydraulic mining technology while working at Buckeye Hill and American Hill respectively. It consisted of a wooden contraption held together by iron clamps that allowed miners to direct a fifty-foot column of water at a gravel bank using a canvas hose, which broke up the gravel and washed it into a series of sluices where the heavy gold flakes settled out of the lighter earth. Though it revolutionized gold mining, the technique also caused severe environmental damage. The vast quantities of sediments that were released in the hydraulic mining process washed downstream, burying homes and farmland. Angry farmers eventually brought an end to hydraulic mining when they scored a victory in federal court in 1884.

In 1854 Chabot also established two sawmills in Sierra County. Two years later he abandoned the mining business and went to San Francisco, where he built the city's first public water system, bringing the waters of Lobos Creek into San Francisco. This led to projects supplying other cities with water, including Portland, Maine, and Milwaukee, Wisconsin.

Chabot founded the Contra Costa Water Company in 1866, which developed a monopoly on supplying water to Oakland and neighboring areas. First he built a dam at Temescal Creek, creating Lake Temescal. He began work on an even larger dam at San Leandro Creek before the Temescal dam was even completed. In 1870, his company completed the dam of San Leandro Creek, creating a reservoir that would later be named Lake Chabot, in present-day Castro Valley.

In or about 1869, Chabot built waterworks for the city of San Jose, and about the same time constructed those for the supply of Vallejo. He was involved in several other businesses during this time, including a paper mill in Stockton, the Judson Manufacturing Company in Oakland, the Pioneer Pulp Mill Company near Alta (Placer County), the Puget Sound Iron Company, and a large tract of land in Washington state for the cultivation of cranberries.

In 1883, Chabot donated a telescope and the fund to build an observatory to the city of Oakland. The observatory was to be named Oakland Observatory but quickly became known as the Chabot Observatory. The original observatory was built in Lafayette Square, near downtown Oakland, and was moved in 1915 to the hills above Oakland. In 2000 it moved 2 miles north to a higher elevation on Skyline Boulevard. At that time it underwent significant expansion and became known as the Chabot Space & Science Center.

Other charitable activities included building housing for veterans in Yountville and a shelter in Oakland for unemployed women and daycare for the children of working women.

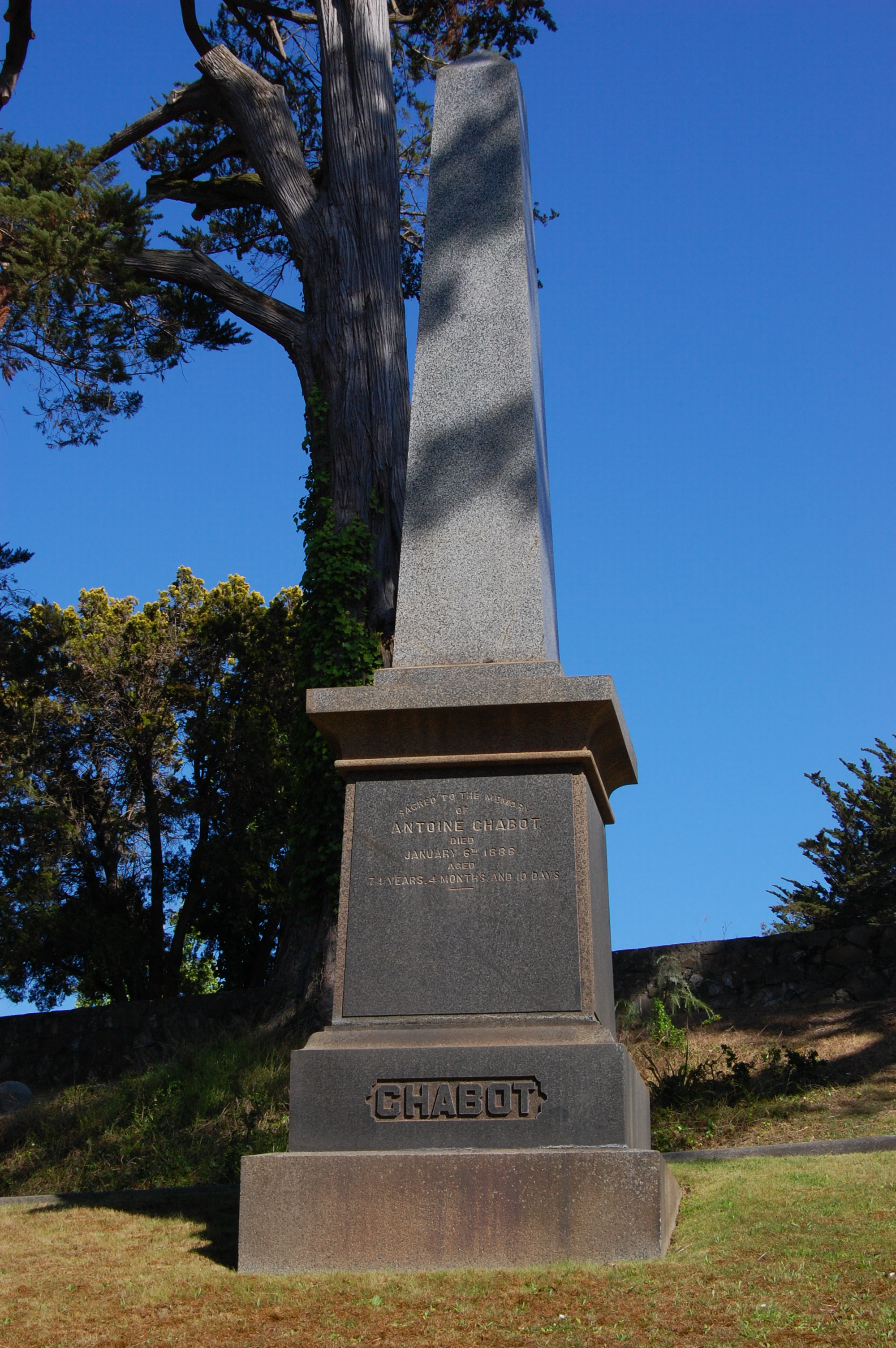
Grave

He died on January 6, 1888, and is buried in Mountain View Cemetery in Oakland.

== Legacy ==
There are several San Francisco Bay Area locations that are named for Anthony Chabot:

- Chabot Space & Science Center, a public science center and planetarium in Oakland
- Chabot College, a public community college in Hayward
- Chabot-Las Positas Community College District, of which Chabot College is part
- Anthony Chabot Regional Park, a regional park in Oakland
- Anthony Chabot Elementary School in Oakland
- Lake Chabot, a manmade lake located in northern Castro Valley.
- Lake Chabot (Vallejo), a manmade lake located in northern Vallejo
- Lake Chabot Road, a road between San Leandro and Castro Valley
- Chabot Road and Chabot Crest, streets in Oakland
- Chabot Drive, a street in Pleasanton
- Chabot Cinema, a movie theater in Castro Valley
- Chabot Elementary School in Castro Valley
- Chabot Veterinary Clinic in Hayward
- Chabot Fault that runs through the Oakland Hills.
