= Anthony Chabot Regional Park =

Park in Alameda County, California

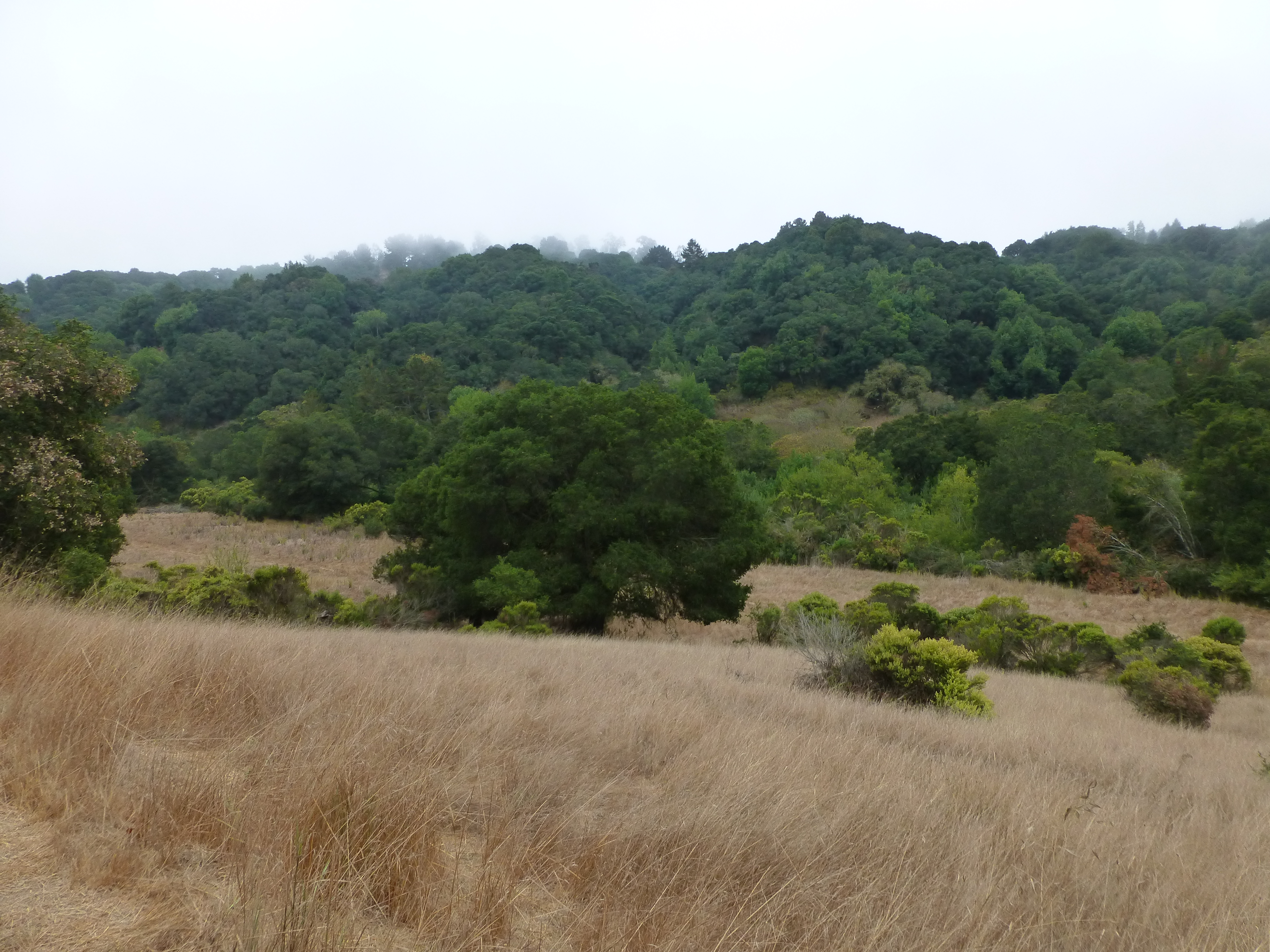

- Location within Oakland, California Location within California Location within the United States
- Location: San Leandro Hills
- Nearest city: Oakland, California
- Coordinates: 37.766°N 122.119°W
- Area: 5,067 acres (2,051 ha)
- Created: 1952
- Operator: East Bay Regional Park District

Anthony Chabot Regional Park is a regional park in Alameda County, California, United States. It is part of the East Bay Regional Park District system, and covers 5,067 acres (2,051 ha) in the San Leandro Hills adjacent to Oakland, San Leandro and Castro Valley. Popular activities include hiking, cycling and horseback riding. A gun range operated by the Chabot Gun Club was shut down in 2016, following complaints about pollution.

The terrain of the park is often steep, consisting of grasslands, chaparral, and eucalyptus groves.

== Natural history ==
Anthony Chabot Regional Park is part of the San Leandro Creek watershed, which covers approximately 49.4 square miles. The watershed includes Lake Chabot and Upper San Leandro Reservoir. Dams at the two reservoirs provide drinking water storage and regulate the flow of San Leandro Creek. Within the park, Grass Valley Creek supports a riparian corridor before draining into Lake Chabot.

== Recreational activities ==
The park is adjacent to Lake Chabot Regional Park, Redwood Regional Park, Dunsmuir Ridge Open Space, and the Upper San Leandro Reservoir. There are trails for hiking, horseback riding, and cycling that connect to other regional parks. Trailheads are located along Redwood Road and Skyline Boulevard in Oakland. The park houses two equestrian centers for private horse boarding and lessons: Chabot Equestrian Center and Skyline Ranch Equestrian Center.

Redwood Canyon Public Golf Course, a marina with rental boats, and picnic areas are located at adjacent Lake Chabot Regional Park.

== Camping ==
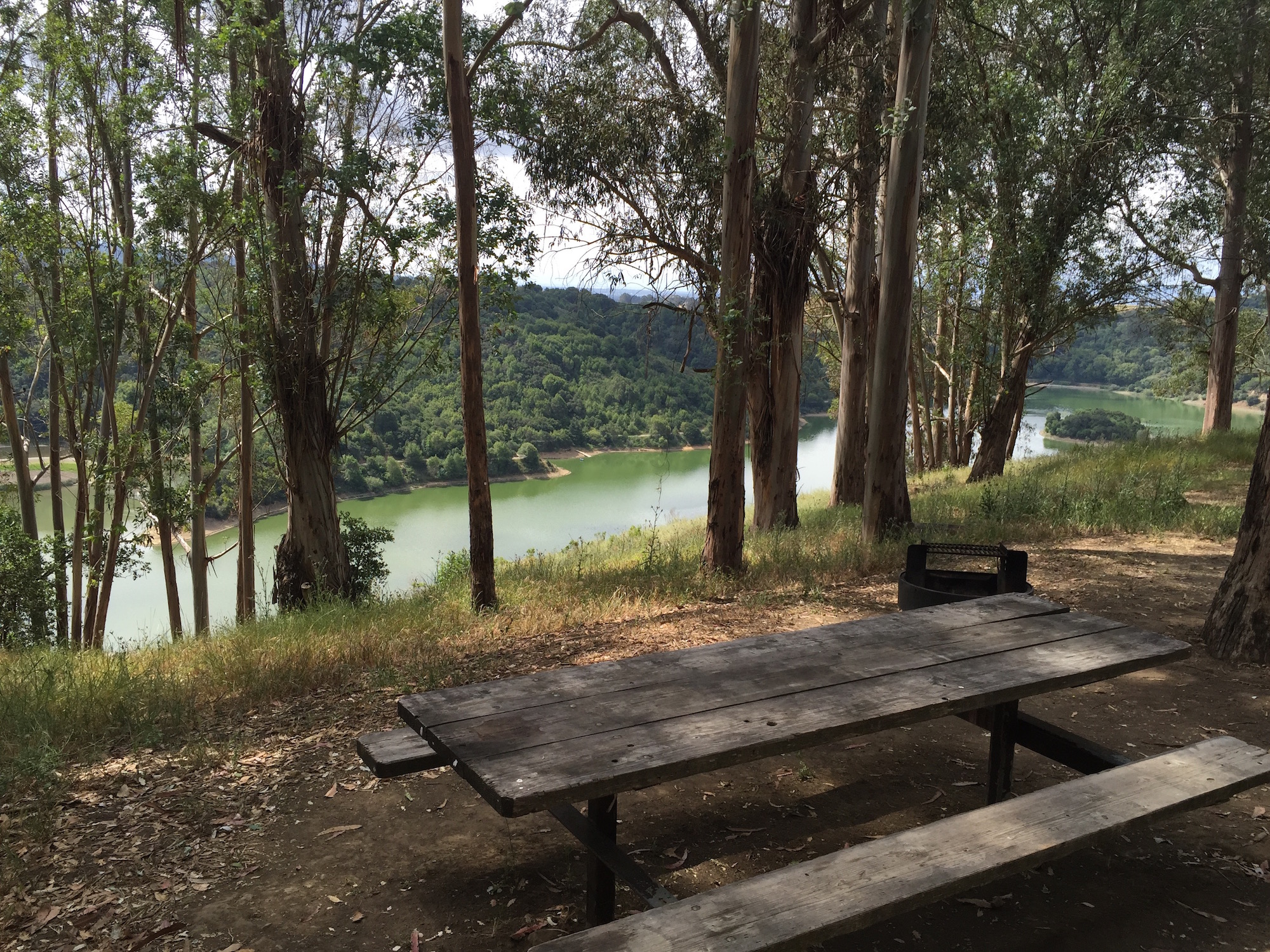
View of Lake Chabot from a campsite at Anthony Chabot Family Campground

Camping is a major activity in the park with a 75-campsite family campground and seven group camps. Anthony Chabot Family Campground is open year round and features 53 drive-to tent campsites, 10 walk-to tent campsites, and 12 RV/trailer campsites. Some campsites offer views overlooking Lake Chabot. The park's seven group campsites are for groups ranging in size from 11 to 300 campers. Bort Meadow Group Camp, with a capacity of 300, also allows equestrian camping.

== History ==
The park opened in 1952 as Grass Valley Regional Park, named for the dominant geographic feature of the northern part of the park, Grass Valley. In 1965 the park was renamed in honor of Anthony Chabot, the builder of Lake Chabot and Oakland's first public water system.

The lands that make up the park were originally ancestral land of the Jalquin, an Ohlone and Bay Miwok speaking tribe. The lands were divided by the Mexican land grants in the 1840s, the southern portion of the park to Rancho San Lorenzo and the northern portion to Rancho San Antonio. In the 1860s American settlers ranched the area including the 525-acre Grass Valley Ranch located in the area that is today Bort Meadow. Cattle grazing continues in Grass Valley.

Extensive coast redwood logging occurred in Anthony Chabot Regional Park and neighboring Redwood Regional Park from the late 1800s to early 1900s. While all the original coast redwoods in Anthony Chabot Regional Park were logged, many regrowth trees are over 100 years old.

Various water companies, predecessors to the East Bay Municipal Utility District, consolidated much of the land for watershed purposes. Beginning around 1910, the water companies were responsible for planting the large eucalyptus plantations that are still a dominant feature in the park.

Some water company land was leased to ranchers in the 1900s, including the family of Manuel Maciel, an Azorean immigrant. The Maciel family (later changed to Marciel after an error in a local school record), ranched the land in the area that is now the Anthony Chabot Family Campground and marksmanship range. The main access road to these facilities is named Marciel Road in the family's honor.

In the area of Big Bear Staging Area along Redwood Road was the Big Bear Tavern. While no traces remain, this was the site that began the traditional jazz revival. In 1940, Lu Watters formed the Yerba Buena Jazz Band as a way to reject big band music of the era which he viewed to be bland. Jam sessions were regularly held at the Big Bear Tavern where crowds of up to 400 could assemble on the dance floor. The tavern is memorialized by the band's song "Big Bear Stomp".

A ropes course, archery range, and motorcycle park were once located at the park.

A marksmanship range was operated within the park by the non-profit Chabot Gun Club. Due to lead contamination, the East Bay Regional Park District Board of Directors voted unanimously to shut down the marksmanship range operated by the Chabot Gun Club. The range, which has been in operation since 1963, ceased operations on September 5, 2016.

== Filmography ==
A service station film set was built along Redwood Road at the Big Bear Staging Area in Anthony Chabot Regional Park for a chase scene in Clint Eastwood's True Crime (1999).
