= Dr. Aurelia Reinhardt Redwood Regional Park =

Park with large redwood grove in California

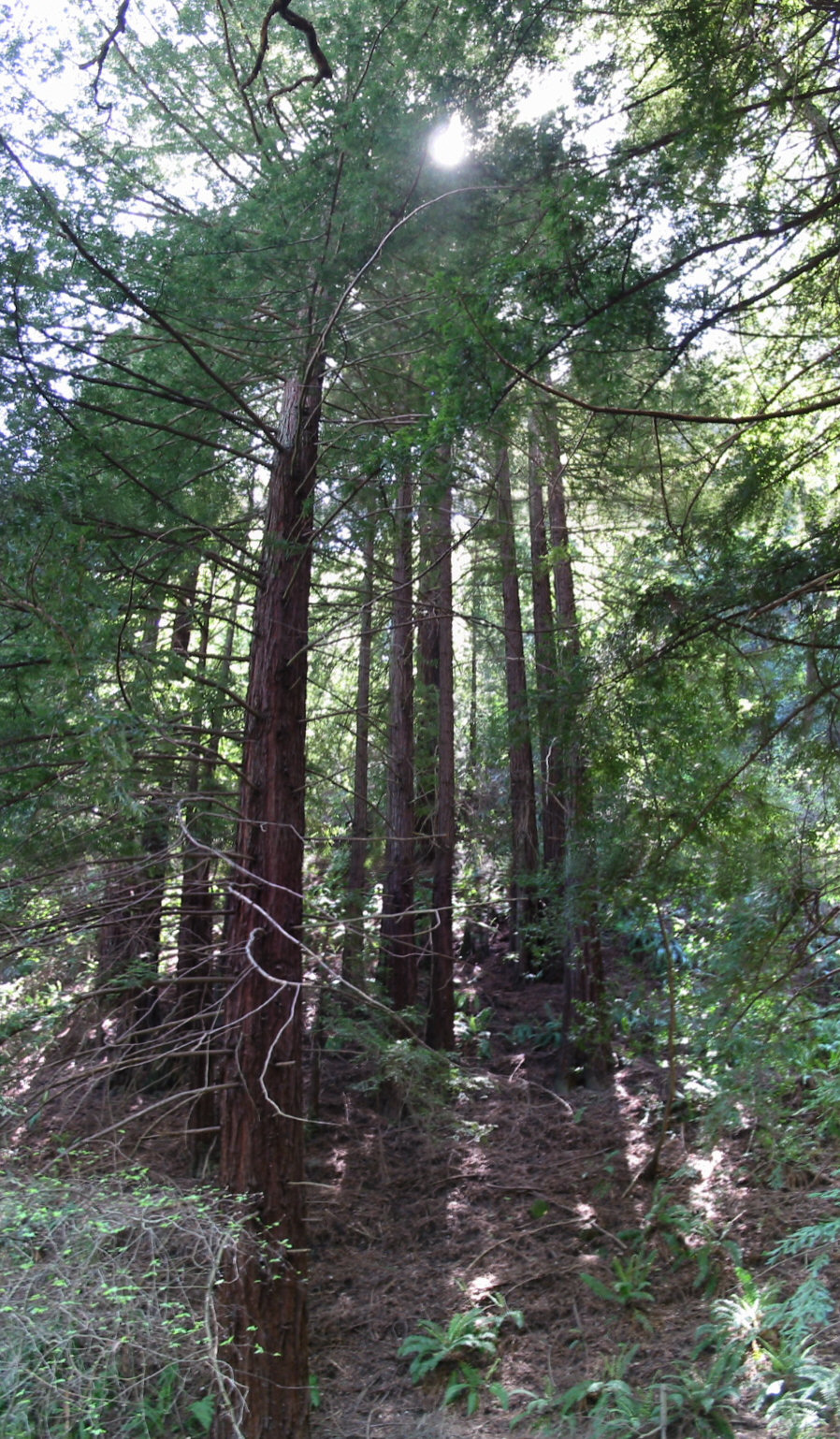
- Third-growth Sequoias on the Orchard Trail

- Location within Oakland, California Location within California Location within the United States
- Location: Oakland
- Coordinates: 37°48′48.8″N 122°09′57.3″W
- Area: 1,830 acres (7,400,000 m^{2})
- Opened: 1939
- Operator: East Bay Regional Park District

Dr. Aurelia Reinhardt Redwood Regional Park (formerly known as Redwood Regional Park) is a part of the East Bay Regional Parks District (EBRPD) in the San Francisco Bay Area. It is located in the hills east of Oakland, California. The park contains the largest remaining natural stand of coast redwood (Sequoia sempervirens) found in the East Bay. The park is part of an historical belt of coast redwood extending south to Leona Canyon Regional Open Space Preserve and east to Moraga.. Part of the natural area is old-growth forest and recognized by the Old-Growth Forest Network.

Redwood forests are more commonly found closer to the coast where the air is cool and humid year-round. In the Bay Area, such forests are found in the Santa Cruz Mountains and the Marin Hills. The unique geographical circumstances of the redwood forest in Redwood Regional Park create coastal conditions. Winds funneled through the Golden Gate flow directly across the Bay and are channeled into the linear valley in which the Montclair District of Oakland is situated. This valley is also well-watered all year round and is protected from extremes of temperature and high winds.

== History ==
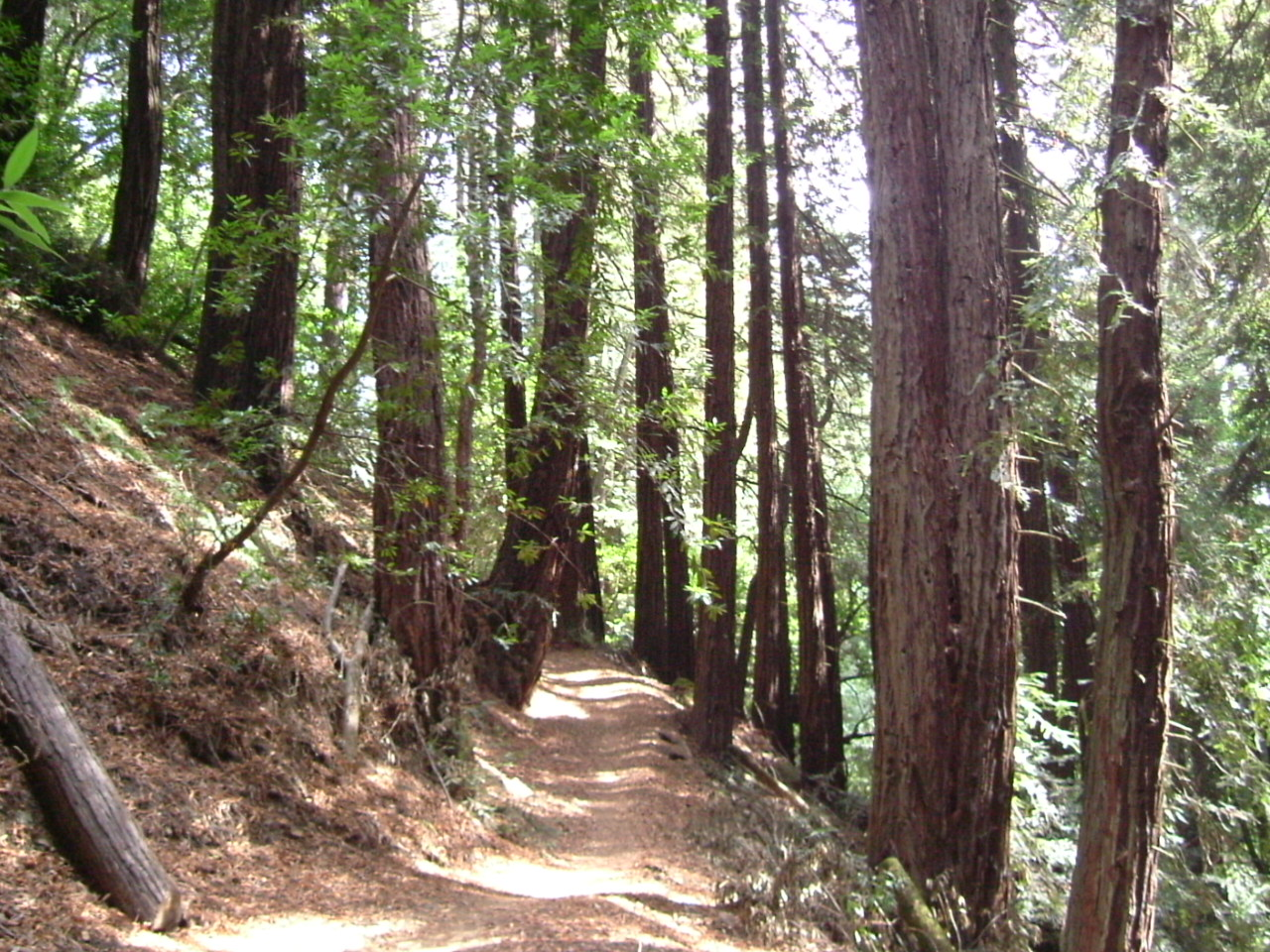
Redwood trees on the Golden Spike Trail

Up to the middle of the 19th century, the bulk of the redwood forest lay in the Redwood Creek valley, with extensions to the surrounding ridges. In 1826 British navy captain Frederick William Beechey used the "Navigation Trees", two particularly tall redwood trees along the ridges, to help them navigate in San Francisco Bay. However, logging from 1845 to 1860 wiped out the original trees, leaving only their stumps. A second logging occurred after the 1906 San Francisco earthquake. In this instance the second growth redwoods (approximately 50 years old) as well as the stumps from the first generation trees were logged, the site of which is registered as California Historical Landmark #962. The redwoods contained in today's regional park are third-growth trees, many of which are over 100 years old. Only one old-growth redwood remains in the area, a 93 feet (28 m) tall tree that seems to grow miraculously out of a rock on a cliff face near Merritt College, which may have survived because it was out of reach for loggers. Once home to a grove named for her, the entire park was named for Dr. Aurelia Reinhardt in 2019.

== Activities ==
Popular activities for park visitors include picnicking, jogging, hiking, archery, and horseback riding along the 40 miles (64 km) of park trails. Fishing is not allowed inside Redwood Regional Park. The park offers four picnic sites that can accommodate groups of 50 to 150 people. Advance reservations are recommended. These are reservable and accessible to handicapped persons. Some overnight group camping areas are also available. Reservations are required. A play structure for children is a quarter mile down Stream Trail from the Canyon Meadow staging area.

Nature watching is another popular activity. The park is home to rare species, such as the golden eagle and the Alameda striped racer. More common fauna are deer, raccoons, rabbits, and squirrels.

The trails are sometimes closed due to severe weather or effects from it or the general maintenance of the park.

== Chabot Center ==
In 1989 Chabot Observatory & Science Center was formed as a Joint Powers Agency with the City of Oakland, the Oakland Unified School District, and the East Bay Regional Park District, in collaboration with the Eastbay Astronomical Society, and in 1992 was recognized as a nonprofit organization. The project was led by Chabot's Executive Director and CEO, Dr. Michael D. Reynolds, breaking ground for the facility in October 1996 with construction of the new 88,000-square-foot (8,200 m^{2}) Science Center beginning in May 1998.

In January 2000, anticipating the opening of the new facility, the organization changed its name from Chabot Observatory & Science Center to Chabot Space & Science Center. The new name was chosen to better convey the organization's focus on astronomy and the space sciences, while communicating both the broad range and the technologically advanced nature of programs available in the new Science Center.

Opened August 19, 2000, the Chabot Space & Science Center is an 86,000-square-foot (8,000 m^{2}), state-of-the-art science and technology education facility on a 13-acre (53,000 m^{2}) site in the hills of Oakland, California, adjoining the western boundary of Redwood Regional Park. (Note: The museum was formerly an affiliate in the Smithsonian Affiliations program. The Smithsonian alliance no longer continues.)

== See also ==
- Old Survivor
