= Hacienda Business Park =

Job and housing center in Pleasanton, California

Coordinates: 37.69°N 121.9°W

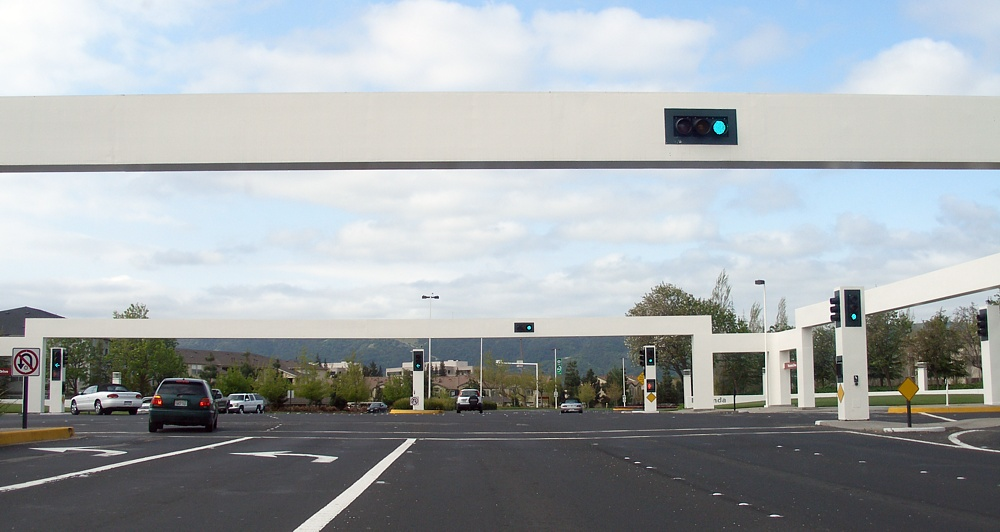
Distinctive motif for traffic lights in Hacienda Business Park

Hacienda Business Park is a 900-acre (364 hectare) mixed-use job center and housing development in Pleasanton, California.

== History ==
Approved in 1982 and ratified by Pleasanton voters in 1983, the business park covers approximately 20 square blocks and features many multi-story office buildings and headquarters for mid-sized companies. It was envisioned by local and county planners as a location for office space that would be less expensive than that of Silicon Valley or San Francisco, close to housing in Pleasanton and nearby Dublin as well as the homes of existing employees in the San Francisco Bay Area.

Hacienda was one of the largest projects of its kind ever approved and built in California. It was designed with visually striking gateway arches spanning peripheral entrances and key intersections. The developers explained they were trying to create an unforgettable visual signature to grab the attention of corporate facilities managers touring California to identify candidate sites for future facilities: "They will see numerous projects and go back to their offices with stacks of brochures—they will never forget Hacienda".

In 2010, the city settled a lawsuit to allow for more affordable housing development in the area.

== Location ==
It is located adjacent to the Dublin/Pleasanton BART station. San Joaquin Regional Transit District (SJRTD) provides commuter subscription service from the Central Valley on several lines in addition to local service provided by WHEELS and County Connection.
