= Shadow Cliffs Regional Recreation Area =

Lake-based park in Alameda County, California

Coordinates: 37°40′10″N 121°50′22″W

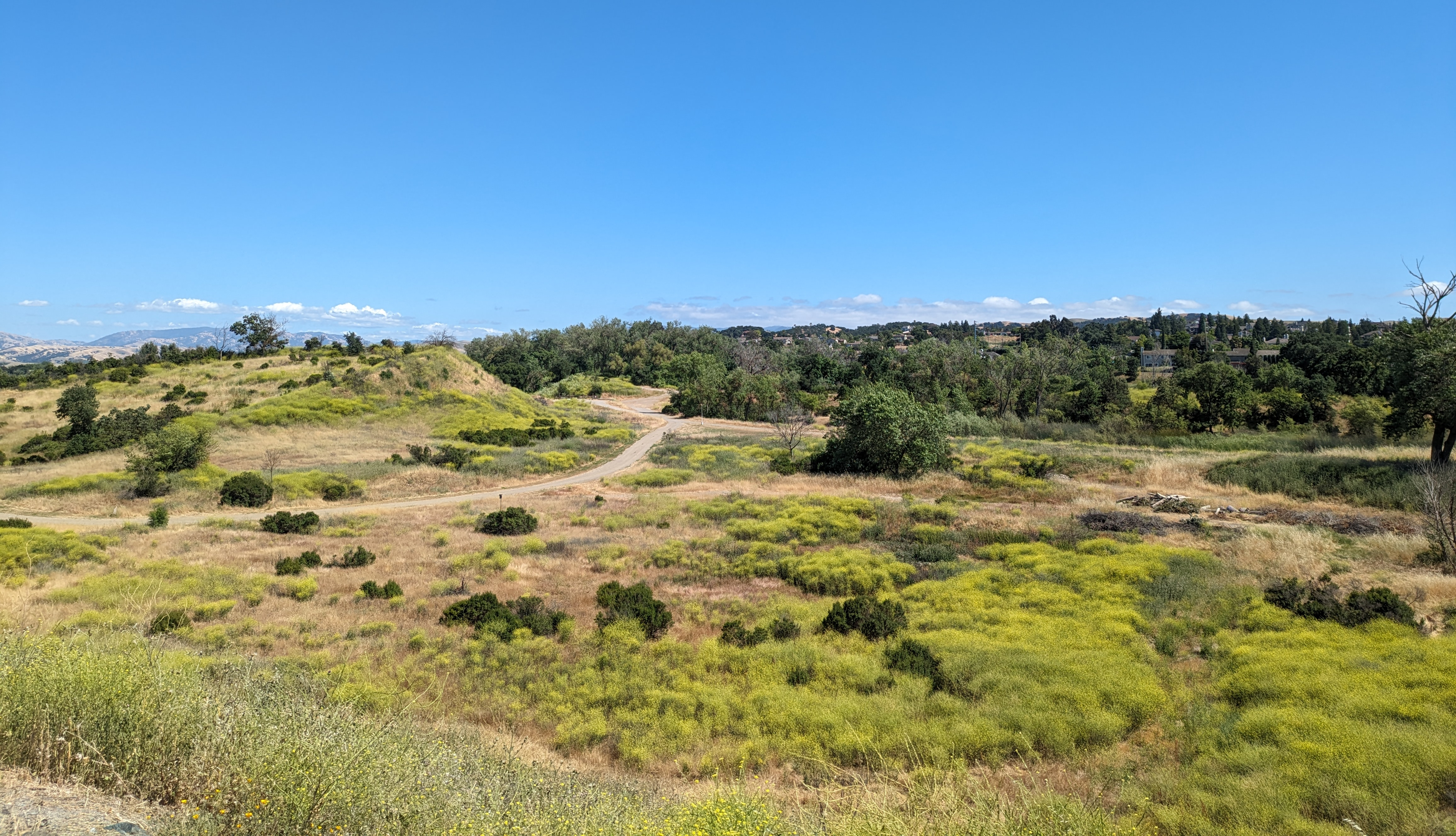
- Interactive map of Shadow Cliffs Regional Recreation Area
- Location: Alameda County, California
- Nearest city: Livermore, California; Pleasanton, California
- Area: 266 acres (1,080,000 m^{2})
- Created: 1971
- Operator: East Bay Regional Park District
- Status: Open

Shadow Cliffs Regional Recreation Area is a regional park on the border of Pleasanton and Livermore, California, that is part of the East Bay Regional Parks (EBRP) system. Its lake, once a gravel pit, has a sandy beach and is used for swimming, fishing, and recreational boating. The park once featured water slides, which were closed in 2011 and have since been taken down, and are planned to be replaced by an Interpretive Center. The park is also a popular picnic ground.

== History ==
Shadow Cliffs, a former gravel quarry, was donated to EBRP by Kaiser Industries, the former operator of the quarry, and opened as a park in 1971. The U.S. Bureau of Outdoor Recreation provided a grant of $250,000 for development of park facilities. Thus funded, EBRPD developed a 266 acres (1,080,000 m^{2}) park that included an 80 acres (320,000 m^{2}) lake, picnic facilities and large parking lot.

== Activities ==
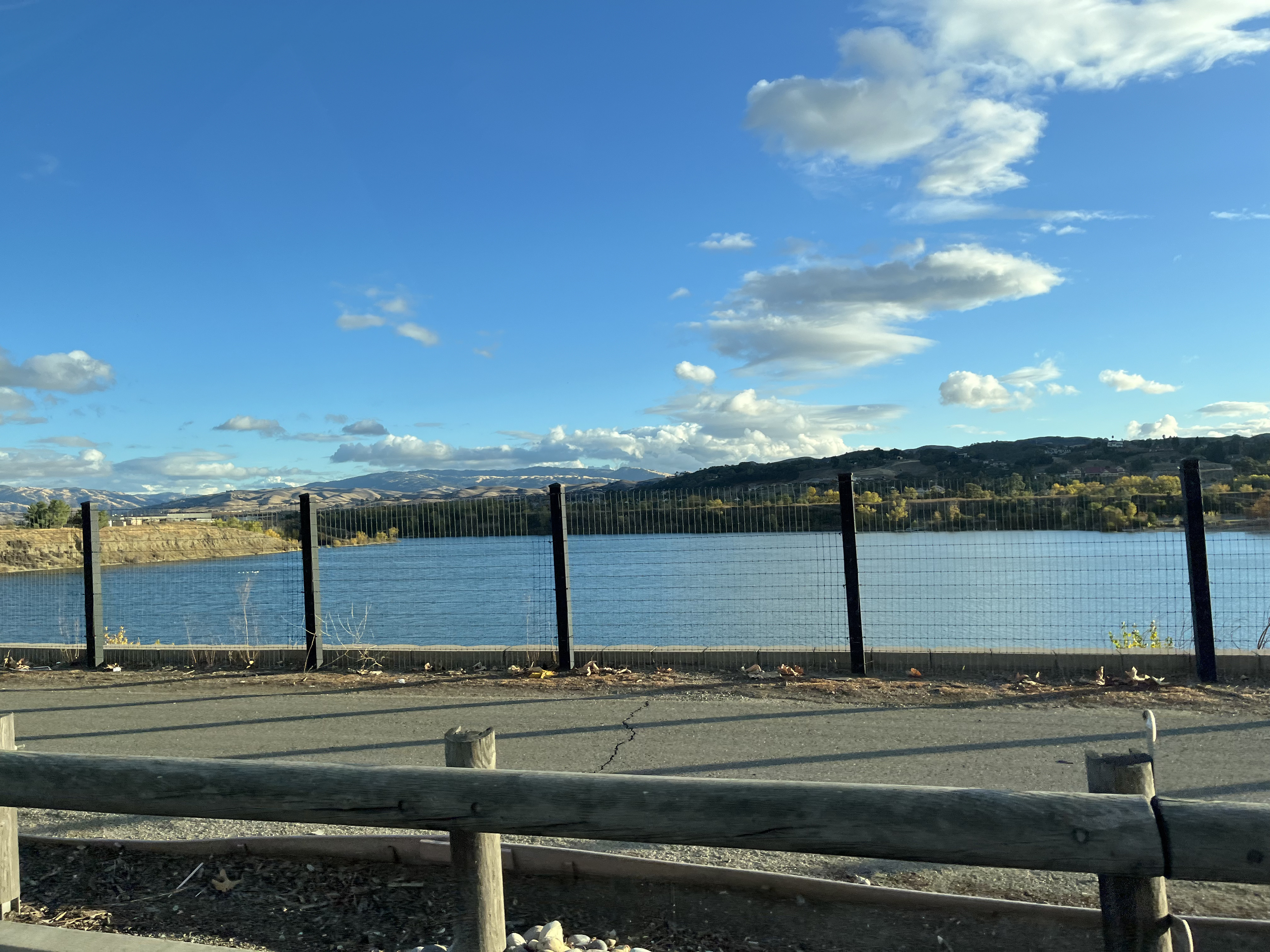
The lake, from the north

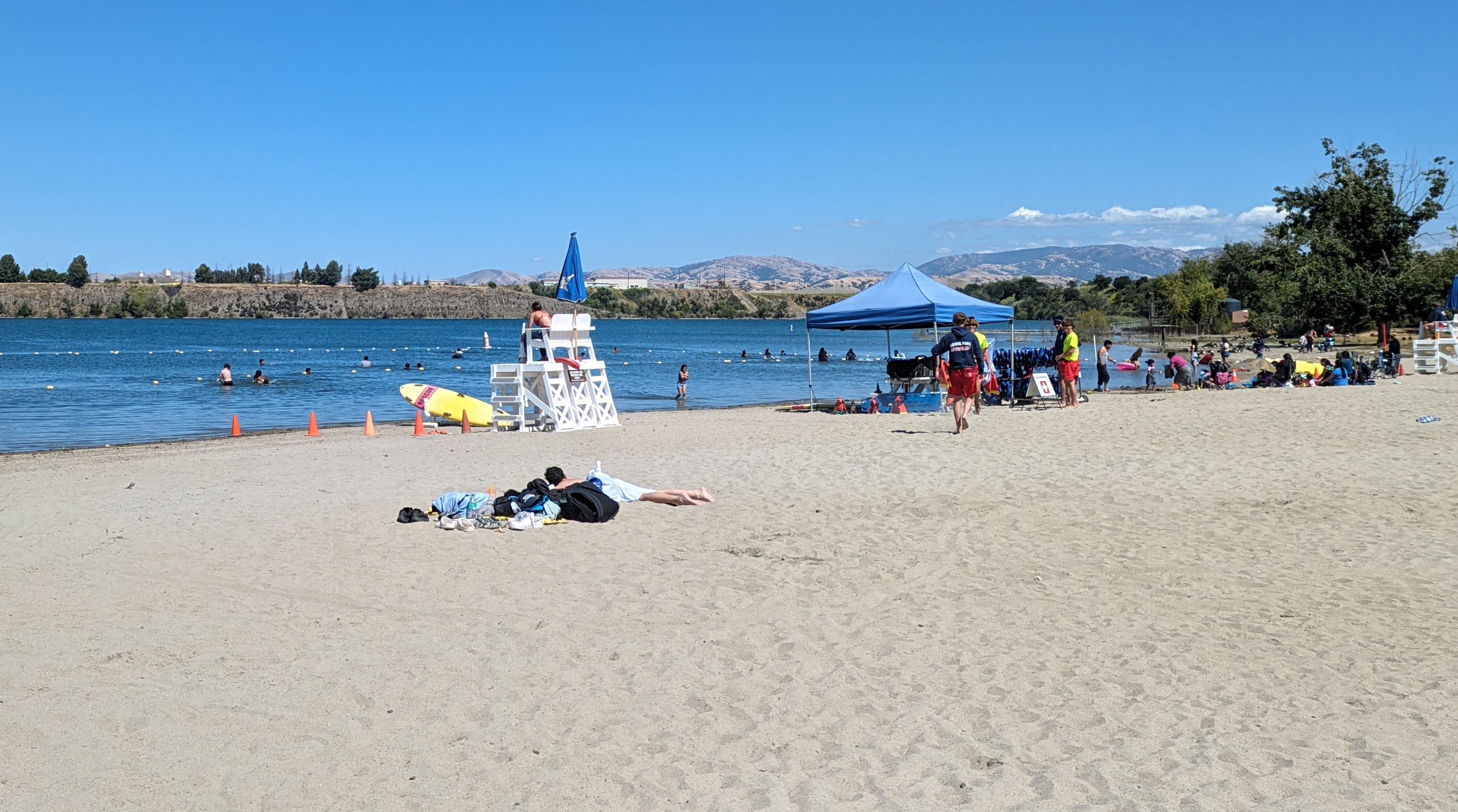
Beachgoers at the lake

=== Swimming ===
Swimming is allowed year-round at the swimmer's own risk, although lifeguards are on duty during the summer. The swimming beach on the main lake and a refreshment stand are open on weekends in spring and fall and daily in summer. Pets and glass containers are not allowed on the sandy areas of the beach. Beach wheelchairs are available at no charge on a first-come, first-served basis.

=== Fishing ===
Fishing is allowed in the main lake, provided the angler has a Park District Daily Fishing Access Permit. Trout and catfish are planted every week by park personnel. Other species popular with anglers are bluegill and black bass.

The California Office of Environmental Health Hazard Assessment (OEHHA) has developed a safe eating advisory for fish caught in the Shadow Cliffs Regional Recreation Area based on levels of mercury or PCBs found in local species.

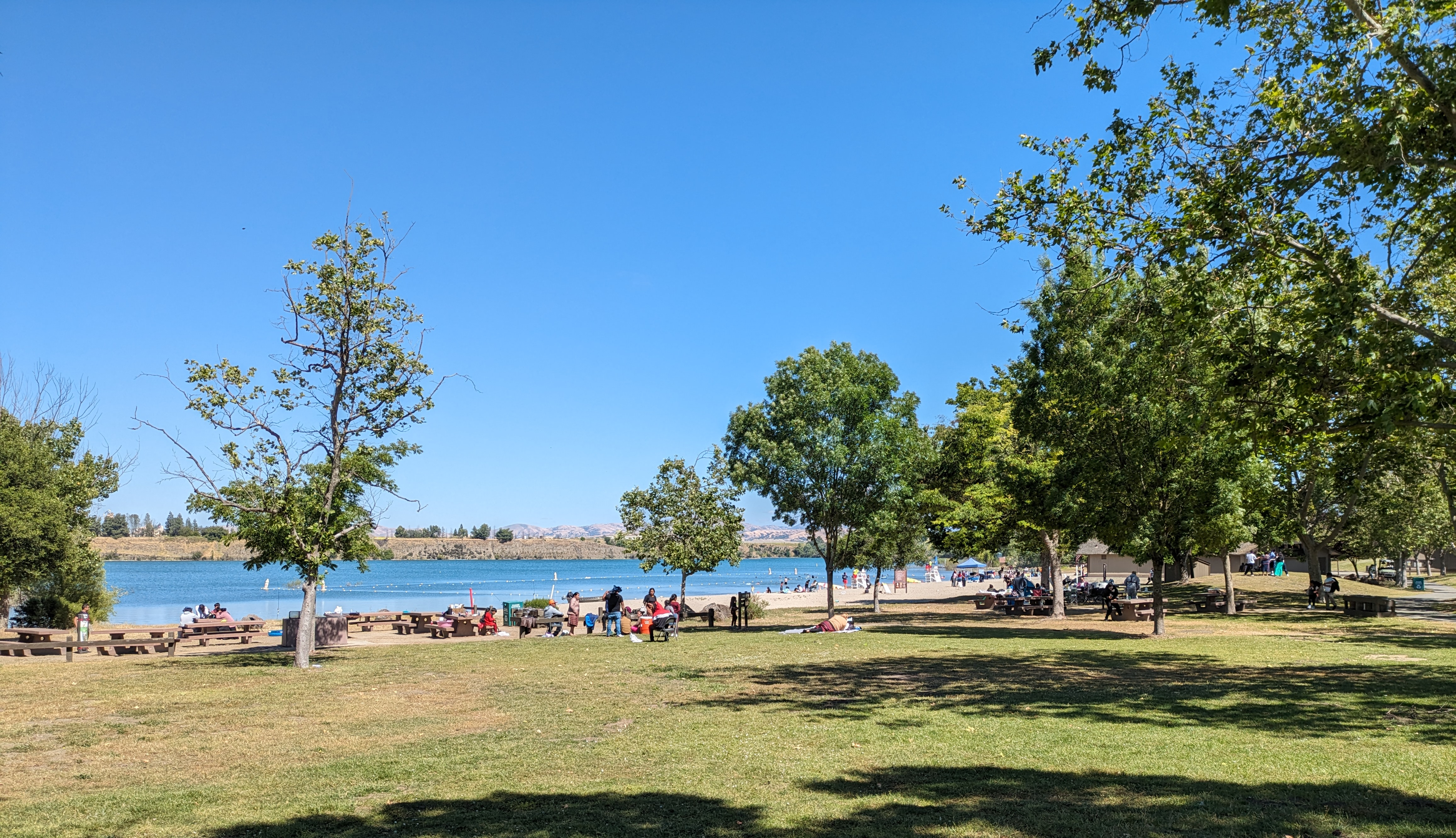
More beachgoers at the lake

== E. coli ==
Lake water at Shadow Cliffs Beach is tested for bacterial levels weekly during April through October and twice a month from November to March. In July 2014, EBRP closed the lake to swimmers due to extremely high levels of E. coli bacteria. Testing of water samples demonstrated E. coli at 6,100 colonies per 100 milliliters at the lake's south beach and 1,000 colonies per 100 milliliters at the north beach. California's state standard for daily maximum exposure is 235 colonies per 100 milliliters. Hal MacLean, the district water management supervisor, suggested that a combination of drought conditions, low water levels and accumulated animal feces—probably from geese—had caused the high bacterial content. EBRP planned to treat the lake with an oxidizing agent and "direct geese away from the swim area" in an attempt to lower the levels.

== Quagga mussel inspections ==
As of October 2016, EBRPD requires that all motorized and paddle boats entering Shadow Cliffs Lake be inspected for quagga mussels. The district charges owners a $7.00 fee to inspect motorized boats, and $3.00 to inspect inflatables, kayaks, canoes, and other vessels carried on top of cars entering Shadow Cliffs Regional Recreation Area.
