= Lake Chabot (Vallejo) =

Man-made lake in Vallejo, California, United States

- Location within San Francisco Bay Area Location within California Location within the United States
- Location: Vallejo, Solano County California, United States
- Coordinates: 38.1366033°N 122.2353987°W
- Type: Reservoir
- Basin countries: United States
- Settlements: Vallejo, California

Lake Chabot (/ʃəˈboʊ/) is a small man-made lake in Vallejo, California, United States. The lake was built in 1871 and served as a water source for Vallejo until the city approved their own municipal water system in 1892.

Dan Foley Park provides recreational access to the south side of the lake. Six Flags Discovery Kingdom is on the lake's north side.
