= Leona Canyon Regional Open Space Preserve =

Coordinates: 37°46′31.38″N 122°8′45.68″W

Leona Canyon Regional Open Space Preserve is a regional park located in Oakland, California that is part of the East Bay Regional Parks system. It is located off Keller Avenue near Oak Knoll Naval Hospital and it extends to Merritt College.
