= Pleasanton Ridge Regional Park =

- View looking south along the ridge from one of the peaks

- Location within San Francisco Bay Area Location within California Location within the United States
- Location: Pleasanton, California
- Coordinates: 37.6154094°N 121.8845595°W
- Area: 5,271-acre (21.33 km^{2})
- Created: 1988
- Operator: East Bay Regional Park District

Pleasanton Ridge Regional Park is a 5,271-acre (21.33 km^{2}) park in the East Bay Regional Park District overlooking Pleasanton, California and the Livermore Valley to the east.

== History ==
Pleasanton Ridge Regional Park, located west of the I-680 freeway and the City of Pleasanton, California, became a reality in 1988, when the East Bay Regional Park District bought 1,700 acres (6.9 km^{2}) to start what would become its second-largest park. In 1980, a real estate developer had proposed building a golf course and a number of new homes atop Pleasanton Ridge. A large number of area residents opposed the proposal and defeated it in a referendum in 1983.

In 2012, the park district announced it had purchased 1,367 acres (5.53 km^{2}) from Robertson Ranch, east of Palomares Road, which it would add to Pleasanton Ridge Regional Park. The tract included the landmark Sunol Peak (elevation 2,163 feet (659 m). The price was reported as $6.2 million. The report stated that prior to the purchase, the regional park contained 7,500 acres (30 km^{2}) of land.

== Tyler Ranch acquisition ==
The Tyler Ranch extends for about 3.5 miles (5.6 km) along Sunol Ridge. (Note: The area actually acquired totalled 1,476 acres (5.97 km^{2}), bringing the size of the expanded park to 6,146 acres (24.87 km^{2}).) The north end of the ranch abutted the existing Pleasanton Ridge park at the end of Kilkare Road. It also has good access from Foothill Road. The acquisition was supported by the Priem Family Foundation, which is dedicated to preserving open space in the greater Bay Area.

The park was scheduled to grow by almost 1,500 acres (6.1 km^{2}) (sic) with the acquisition of the Tyler Ranch. EBRPD claimed that the Tyler Ranch acquisition marked the occasion when the district acquired 100,000 acres since it was formed in 1934. The Tyler Ranch Staging Area, located on the holdings of Tyler Ranch and Robertson Ranch, opened in December 2023 and offers additional walking, horseback riding, and cycling spaces on over 18 miles of trails across 2,800 acres.

== Trails ==
Pleasanton Ridge Regional Park contains over 25 miles (40 km) of trails, most of which are dirt roads, except for the Woodland Trail, the Bay Leaf Trail, and a few sections of the North Ridge and Ridgeline trails. Park elevations range from 400 feet (120 m) at the main entrance to over 1,600 feet (490 m) at the highest point.

Adjacent to the park is the Augustin Bernal Park. The 237-acre park was donated to the city of Pleasanton by Walter S. Johnson in 1971. (Note: Walter S. Johnson was a philanthropist who financially supported the restoration of San Francisco's Palace of Fine Arts. Today, the City of Pleasanton owns and operates the Augustin Bernal Park.)

== Geology and geography ==
Pleasanton Ridge is the southeastern component of the East Bay Hills, which refers geologically to all of the ranges east of the Bay from the Hayward Fault in the west to the Calaveras Fault in the east. The United States Geological Survey (USGS) Geographic Names Information System, however, includes Pleasanton Ridge as part of the Diablo Range in its list of GPS coordinates for the latter.

Hiking up to the ridge

Distant park rangers on horseback pass olive groves
