= Red-legged frog =

Red-legged frog is a common name for several species of frog:

- California red-legged frog, Rana draytonii, a frog endemic to California, United States
- La Selle red-legged frog, Eleutherodactylus furcyensis, a frog found in the Dominican Republic and Haiti
- Northern red-legged frog, Rana aurora, a frog found in Canada and the United States
- Red-legged running frog, Kassina maculata, a frog endemic to Africa

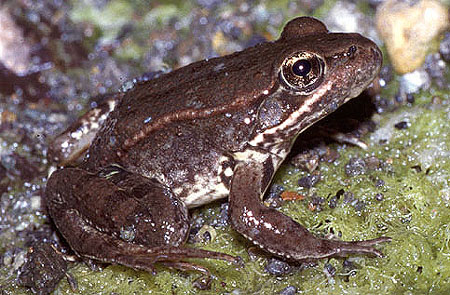
California red-legged frog
Rana draytonii

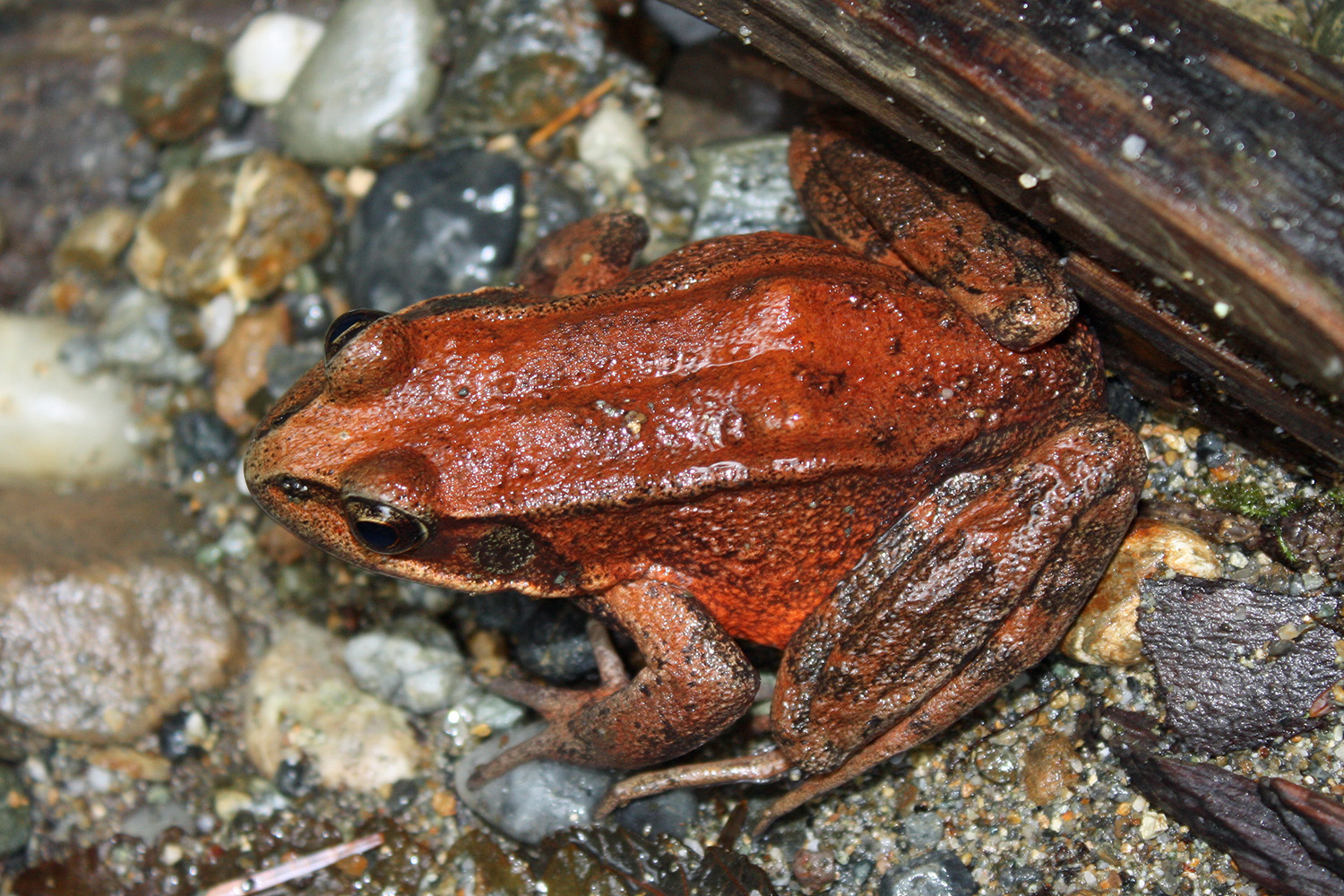
Northern red-legged frog
Rana aurora

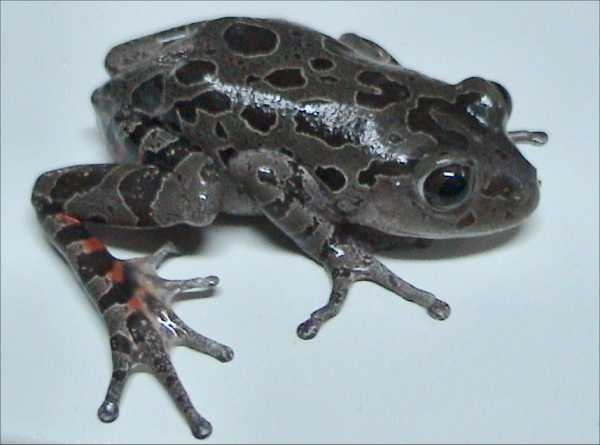
Red-legged running frog
Kassina maculata
