= Martin Luther King Jr. Shoreline =

Coordinates: 37°43′52.08″N 122°12′24.18″W

Martin Luther King Jr. Regional Shoreline
- Location within Oakland, California Location within California Location within the United States
- Type: Regional Shoreline
- Location: San Francisco Bay Area
- Nearest city: Oakland, California
- Area: 741 acres (300 ha)
- Created: 1993
- Operator: East Bay Regional Park District
- Status: Open

Martin Luther King Jr. Shoreline is a regional park located on the shores of the San Leandro Bay in Oakland, California. Part of the East Bay Regional Parks system, it is named after Civil Rights Movement leader Martin Luther King Jr. The park was established in 1980 on a 741 acres (300 ha) tract of land and water leased from the Oakland Airport.

When it was dedicated, it was known as San Leandro Bay Regional Shoreline. Under Secretary of the Department of Interior James A. Joseph spoke at the dedication. In 1992, it was renamed for Martin Luther King Jr. at the request of Oakland mayor Elihu Harris and local religious leaders.

== Facilities ==
- The Shoreline Center is an indoor-outdoor venue that is available for parties, weddings, corporate, school and other group events. It contains a main room, an outdoor deck and a commercial kitchen. Catering can be provided. The facility is rated for 60 guests (seated) or 125 (standing).
- The Tidewater Boating Center is a complex that includes an ADA-accessible dock, a boat house and boat storage area, training area, Recreation Department offices and a security residence. The area of the complex is 12,300 square feet (1,140 m^{2}).
