= Oakland firestorm of 1991 =

Suburban wildland-urban interface conflagration in California

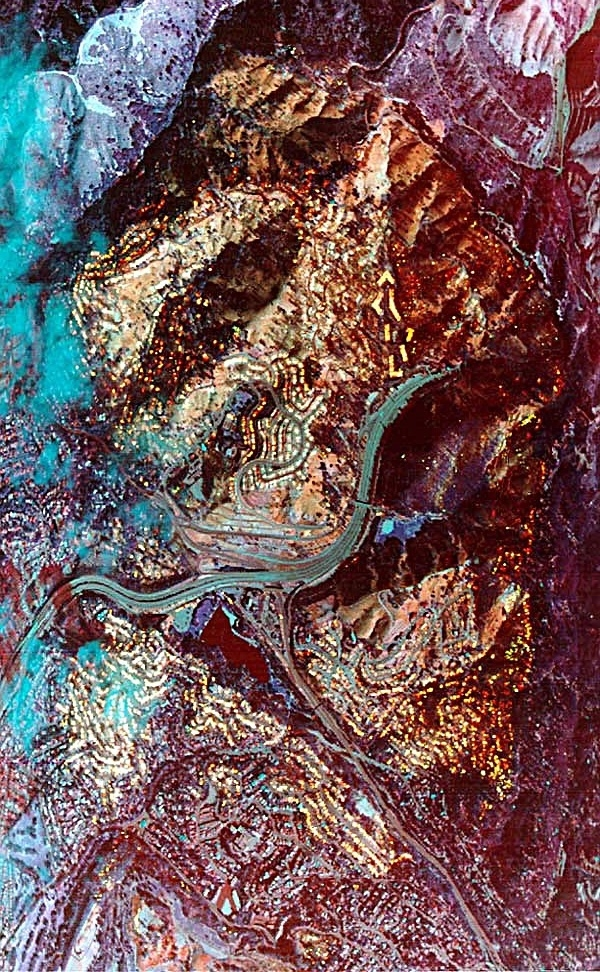
- Infrared aerial photograph of the firestorm. The Highway 13/24 intersection is at center.
- Date: October 19, 1991 –; October 23, 1991; (5 days)
- Location: Oakland, California, United States
- Coordinates: 37.861124°N 122.221892°W

Statistics
- Total area: 1,520 acres (615 ha; 2 sq mi; 6 km^{2})

Impacts
- Deaths: 25 confirmed
- Injuries: 150
- Structures destroyed: 2,843 single-family dwellings and 437 apartment and condominium units
- Cost: $1.5 billion (1991 USD) ($3.16 billion in 2025 dollars)

Ignition
- Cause: rekindled vegetation fire; cause of original grass fire undetermined

A large suburban firestorm occurred on the hillsides of northern Oakland, California, and southeastern Berkeley over the weekend of October 19–20, 1991, before being brought under full control on October 23. The official name of this incident by Cal Fire is the Tunnel Fire. The fire ultimately killed 25 people and injured 150 others. Within the 1,520 acres (620 ha) burned, 2,843 single-family dwellings and 437 apartment and condominium units were destroyed. The economic loss from the fire was estimated at $1.5 billion ($3.16 billion in 2025 dollars).

Perimeter of Oakland firestorm of 1991 (map data)

== Origins ==
The fire started on Saturday, October 19, from an incompletely and improperly extinguished grass fire in the Berkeley Hills, northeast of the intersection of California State Routes 24 and 13 (0.5 mi (0.8 km) north of the Caldecott Tunnel west portal. The cause of the original grass fire was inconclusive. Firefighters fought the 5-acre (2.0 ha) fire on a steep hillside above 7151 Buckingham Boulevard, and believed it to be under control by Saturday night.

The fire re-ignited as a brush fire shortly before 11:00 a.m. on Sunday, October 20, and rapidly spread southwest, driven by wind gusts up to 65 mi (100 km) per hour. It quickly overwhelmed local and regional firefighting resources. By 11:30 a.m., the fire had spread to the nearby Parkwoods Apartments located next to the Caldecott Tunnel. Shortly before noon, the fire had been blown up to the top of Hiller Highlands to the west, from where it began its sweep down into the Hiller Highlands development and the southern hills of Berkeley. Burning embers from houses and vegetation were carried ahead of the fire line by torrid winds and started new blazes ahead of the original burn. Within thirty minutes the fire had crossed both Highway 24 (an eight-lane freeway) and Highway 13 (a four-lane freeway), eventually igniting hundreds of houses in the Forest Park neighborhood on the northwest edge of the Montclair district as well as in the upper Rockridge neighborhood. The fire eventually touched the edge of Piedmont, burning some municipal property, but buildings and houses were spared.

The hot, dry northeasterly winds, dubbed as "Diablo winds" in reference to the Diablo mountain range, Diablo Valley, and surrounding geography of the same name, periodically occur during the early fall season. These are similar to the Santa Ana winds in Southern California, and have been the cause of numerous devastating fires. The Tunnel Fire began generating its own wind, which is the defining characteristic of a firestorm. The superheated fire-driven winds combined with warmer, drier air east of the Berkeley Hills, and interacted with the ambient cooler, more moist Bay/Coastal air to create erratic, dangerous gusts, which helped produce numerous rotational vortices. In addition, a localized hydraulic jump mechanism was induced by the landscape of the Oakland Hills during the windstorm. A hydraulic jump occurs when aggressive, downslope winds transition into swirling winds on the lee side of a ridge. The hydraulic jump pushed the fire downhill, directly into residential infrastructure, which caused chaos for firefighting efforts because fire typically burns uphill, making the path of the fire unpredictable. All of these combined to help spread the fire, tossing embers in all directions. The wind was so strong that it also blew debris across the bay into San Francisco. Ash fell onto the field of Candlestick Park (about 14 miles away from the fire) where the Detroit Lions and San Francisco 49ers were playing that afternoon. The CBS telecast of the game showed live footage of the fire. As with the 1989 Loma Prieta earthquake two years earlier, the blimp shots from the national sports media provided many Bay Area residents with the initial word of the disaster.

By mid-afternoon, the wind had slowed and shifted to the west, driving the fire to the southeast. At about 9:00 p.m., the wind abruptly stopped, giving firefighters a chance to contain the fire.

== Firefighting response and difficulties ==
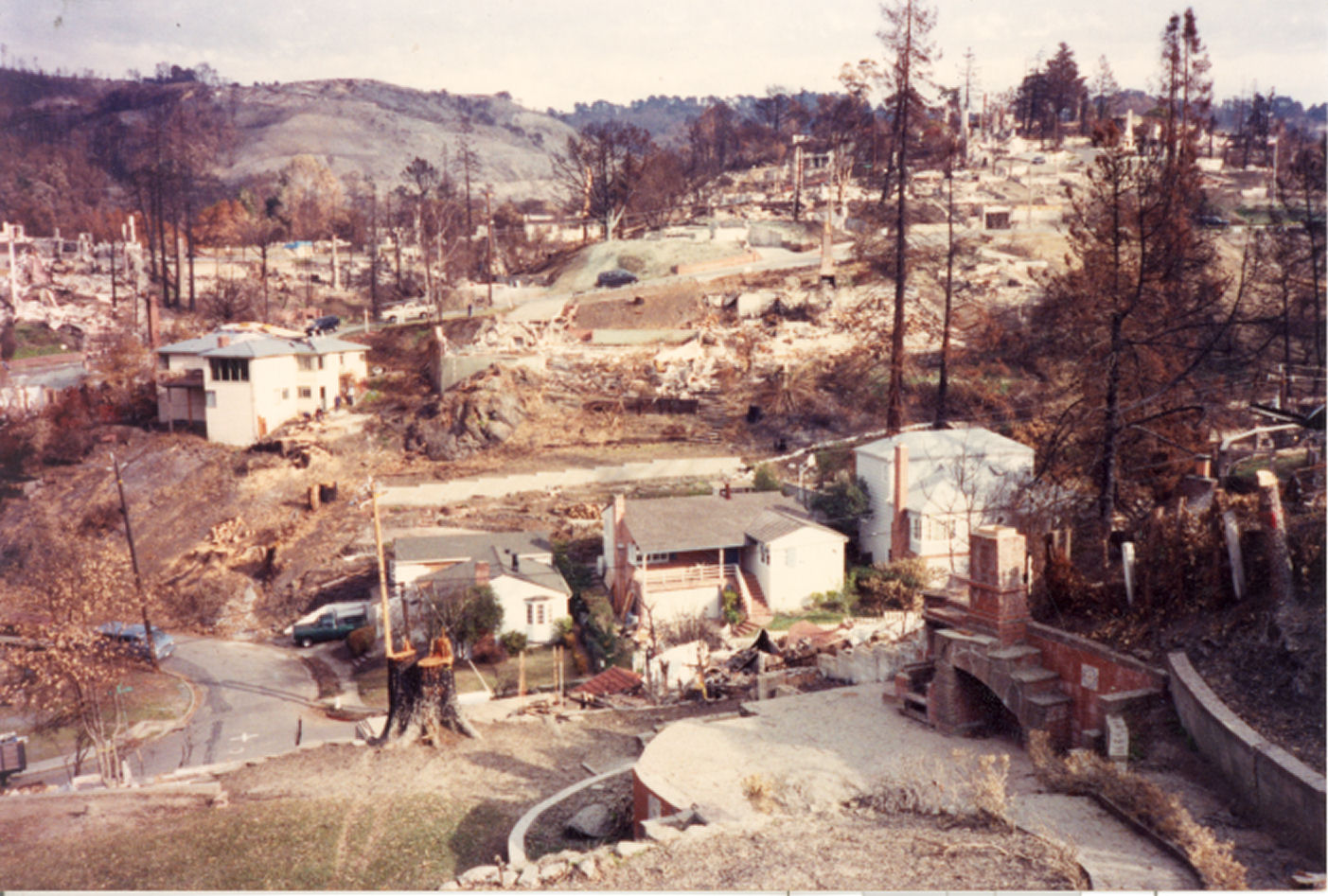
Remains of houses destroyed by the fire near Golden Gate Avenue, looking east.

Assistance from firefighting agencies went as far north as the Oregon state line, as far south as Bakersfield and as far east as the Nevada state line, but was delayed initially. Official reports differ about when the Oakland Fire Department made requests for help, and when the state Department of Forestry and Fire Protection was asked to mobilize air tanker support to the fire zone. Eventually the California Department of Forestry (CDF) was asked to dispatch several air tankers, which doused the fire with fire retardant throughout the day. The CDF established a base at the Naval Air Station in Alameda, which also sent its own fire fighting equipment and materials to the scene of the fire. The next morning, before full control of the fire was taken, satellite photographs, especially infrared (heat-sensing) photographs, were provided with the help of NASA Ames Research Center's Disaster Assistance and Rescue Team (DART) to aid firefighters in plotting the extent of the fire and spotting hidden hot spots.

In terms of alarm assignments, it was the equivalent of a 107-alarm fire.

For a variety of reasons, firefighting teams were initially overwhelmed by the firestorm. Winds were occasionally gusting in excess of 70 mph (110 km/h), creating erratic and extreme fire behavior. Flames took out power lines to 17 pumping stations in the Oakland water system. Outside fire teams faced various equipment compatibility issues, such as hydrants having differently-sized outlets than the hoses used by neighboring counties. Oakland also could not communicate with many mutual aid resources due to antiquated equipment and lack of access to statewide radio frequencies resulting from budget restrictions in preceding years. In some areas, firefighters simply ran out of water as there was no power to refill the emptied reservoirs. Additionally, various narrow, winding roads in the area were crowded with parked cars, blocking fire hydrants and preventing fire trucks and ambulances from getting to where they needed to go.

The most important factor was the rapid spread of the wind-driven fire. Before most of the firefighting resources could be brought to the scene, the fire had established a large perimeter. At its peak, the fire destroyed one house every 11 seconds. By the first hour, the fire destroyed nearly 790 structures. In addition to the winds and heat, an important factor in the fire's rapid spread was the starting point, which was at an interface between developed and undeveloped land. Many of the first dwellings to burn were surrounded by thick, dry vegetation, which only made the fire more severe. Eucalyptus trees are commonly found in the hills of Berkeley and Oakland, and they are especially dangerous in vegetation fires because they shed mass amounts of organic material, such as leaves and bark strands, which are slow to decompose. Eucalyptus trees also contain high concentrations of volatile oils that lower the ignition temperature of organic material and cause explosive ignitions. Other factors included many wood shake/shingle roofs which were easily ignited by embers, and the use of wood chip mulch in landscaping, which was blown about by the fire, spreading embers and igniting vegetation across streets.

The same conditions (known as Diablo Winds) contributed to both a major conflagration nearby in the 1923 Berkeley fire and a smaller fire in the same area on September 22, 1970. Another small fire also started in Wildcat Canyon on December 14, 1980.

As night descended, the firestorm threatened to destroy the historic Claremont Resort hotel, where the media had gathered to report on the fire. Television crews trained their cameras on the dark hill immediately behind the hotel and millions watched as the fire slowly marched house by house toward the evacuated hotel. The fire was stopped shortly before it reached the hotel.

By 5:00 p.m., the winds died down, giving firefighters a chance to control the blaze, though full containment would not be achieved until October 22. As many as 400 engine companies, 1,500 personnel, and 250 agencies worked together to put out the fire.

By Wednesday, October 23, at 8:00 a.m., the fire was declared under control, almost 72 hours after it started.

== Aftermath ==
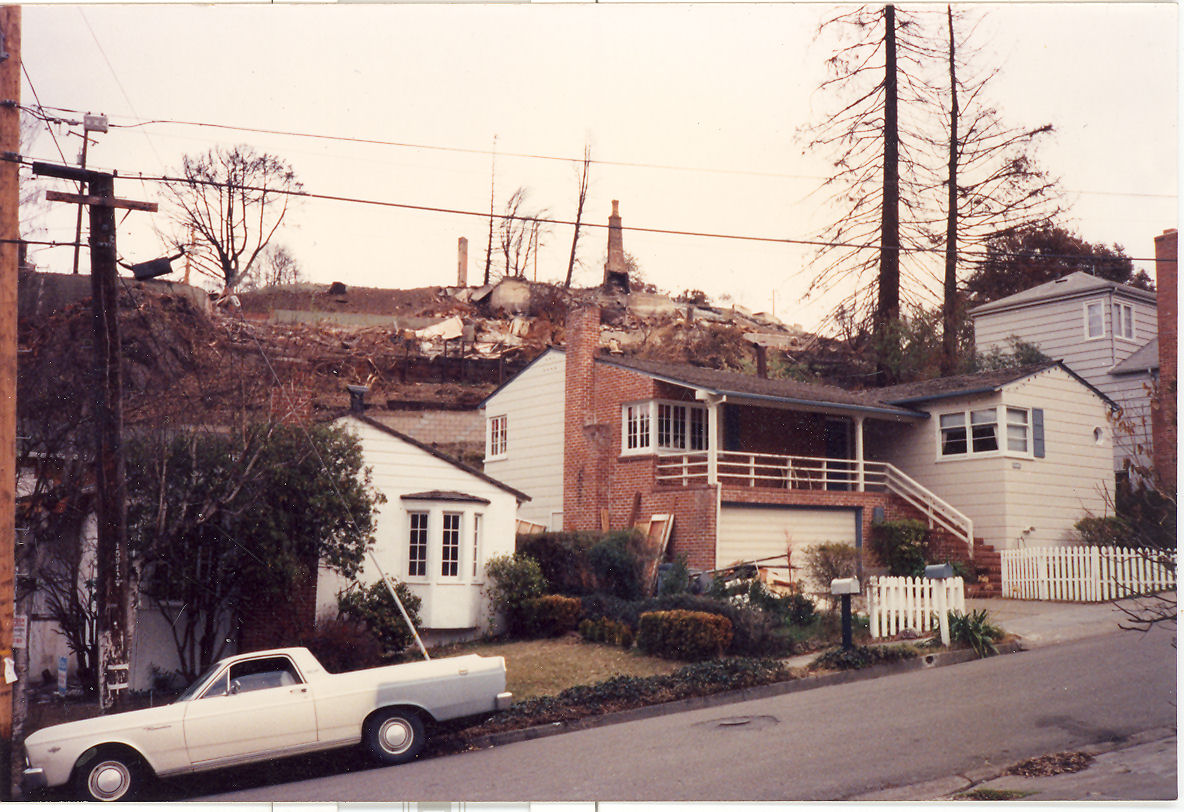
Looking uphill to the southeast from in front of 6360 Brookside Avenue following Oakland firestorm. Eustice Avenue is immediately to the left. These houses were the only ones in the neighborhood to survive the firestorm.

The fire's rapid rate of spread and massively-destructive nature sparked renewed recognition of the dangers posed by wildland-urban interface fires in major cities, as well as spurred research and investigation into improved prevention and suppression of such fires. The wildland-urban interface (WUI) is the area where human-made infrastructure meets undeveloped land, and it can be especially susceptible to fires due to flammable vegetation in the undeveloped areas. The Oakland Hills are generally regarded as an affluent area with dense, high-value housing on steep, winding streets to enhance Bay views and exclusivity. While the city benefitted from houses in the hills because they increased market values, the layout of the neighborhoods and design of the houses made the Oakland Hills even more at risk for a destructive fire to spread fast and aggressively. Some rebuilds after the fire were even more vulnerable as they were larger and packed even more densely. In addition, the narrow, steep, and winding roads created more problems for firefighting efforts as streets became gridlocked when residents attempted to evacuate downhill while crews rushed uphill to reach the fire line. Residents were forced to abandon their cars and move forward on foot, blocking engine access entirely and trapping residents and firefighters alike.

One initiative that arose after the fire was the Oakland & Berkeley Mayors' Task Force on Emergency Preparedness and Community Restoration, appointed by Oakland Mayor Elihu Harris and Berkeley Mayor Loni Hancock. Dr. Edward J. Blakely was chair of the commission.

Another initiative that arose after the fire was the East Bay Hills Fire Operations Group of the Governor's Office of Emergency Services, which produced a report entitled The East Bay Hills Fire, dated February 27, 1992.

Several nonprofit groups also arose after the fire. One, the Hills Emergency Forum, was created by local fire agencies to build consensus on fire safety standards and codes, offer multi-jurisdictional training, and coordinate fuel reduction strategies, along with other goals. At least two citizen groups also arose, the North Hills Phoenix Association and the Claremont Canyon Conservancy to participate in policy decisions and provide educational and stewardship services at the wildland–urban interface. The fire validated that the efforts undertaken by CARD (Collaborating Agencies Responding to Disasters) after the 1989 Loma Prieta earthquake, to build a nonprofit preparedness infrastructure, were key to addressing the needs of vulnerable communities.

In response to deficient firefighting equipment during the disaster, Oakland city firefighters carry more extensive wildland firefighting gear and fire shelters. Prior to and during the firestorm, when this was not standard equipment, firefighters were sometimes forced to don turn-outs which greatly hampered their ability to move quickly and stay cooler during a wildland fire.

Fire hydrants with industry standard 4 1/2 and 2 1/2 inch outlets were later installed throughout the city. The lack of a standard in 1991 caused numerous difficulties for the agencies who attempted to connect to non-standard hydrants, even though the 3-inch (76 mm) outlets previously used by Oakland were considerably more efficient. Water cisterns and a new hills fire station were added, and radio communications were improved.

On June 12, 2008, a brush fire ignited in almost the exact location of the starting point of the 1991 fire, but owing to a rapid response, the preventive measures implemented after the 1991 disaster, and the lack of significant winds, the fire was confined to 2 acres (0.81 ha), with no damage to any structures, and was extinguished within 90 minutes.

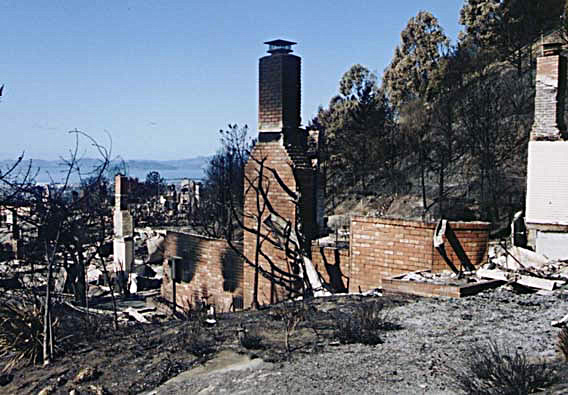
Ruins of homes destroyed by the firestorm.

In 2015, a $4 million federal grant to prevent fires in the Oakland Hills ignited debate over whether to cut down trees in the region. The city and its fire department say clearing young eucalyptus trees and other non-native plants would deter another deadly firestorm like the one that whipped through the hills in 1991.

One of the most famous victims who lost his house in the disaster was game designer Will Wright, who lived a few blocks away from where the fire started. He used his experience of rebuilding his life as the basis for the concept of the Maxis computer game series The Sims, and added the city's recovery from the fire as a scenario in the game SimCity 2000.

The fire provided a sample of more than 3000 structures that burned in a known accidental fire. A group of fire investigators surveyed the residences and looked for artifacts that would normally be considered "suspicious," such as melted metals, spalled concrete and crazed glass. A careful study of 50 of the homes revealed that most of them contained artifacts that would be considered evidence of arson had they been found in an isolated fire that burned to completion.

== In popular culture ==
- This disaster was also included as one of several different disaster scenarios in the 1993 video game SimCity 2000.
- The story of the Oakland fire is a major plot element of the children's book Tikvah Means Hope, by Patricia Polacco. New York: Bantam Doubleday Dell Publishing Group, 1994. ISBN 0-385-32059-0
- The 1993 ABC TV movie Firestorm: 72 Hours in Oakland, starring Jill Clayburgh, LeVar Burton and Michael Gross was based on the Oakland Hills fire. It incorporated actual Oakland fire footage as well as audio from radio transmissions made by the fire crews on the scene.
- The book Almost Home: America's Love-Hate Relationship with Community contained a chapter of critical assessment of the social aftermath of the fire. It highlighted how the selfish and individualistic desires by some of the victims of the fire overwhelmed any preliminary voice of community togetherness, including fraudulent and greedy practices towards charity and insurance claims.
- The fire is a theme in author Maxine Hong Kingston's novel The Fifth Book of Peace.
- In the 1998 novel The Metaphysical Touch by Sylvia Brownrigg, the protagonist's home and dissertation are destroyed by the fire.
- The fourteenth and final episode of the American docudrama Critical Rescue is about the Oakland Firestorm, focusing on the experiences of several survivors and also that of Police Officer John William Grubensky, who was killed in the fire, but not before directing traffic as long as possible to give victims a chance to escape.

== See also ==
- 1923 Berkeley, California, fire
- Camp Fire (2018)
- List of California wildfires
- Marshall Fire
- Palisades Fire
