= North American fire hose coupler incompatibilities =

Inconsistencies of standards of hose and hydrant connectors within North America

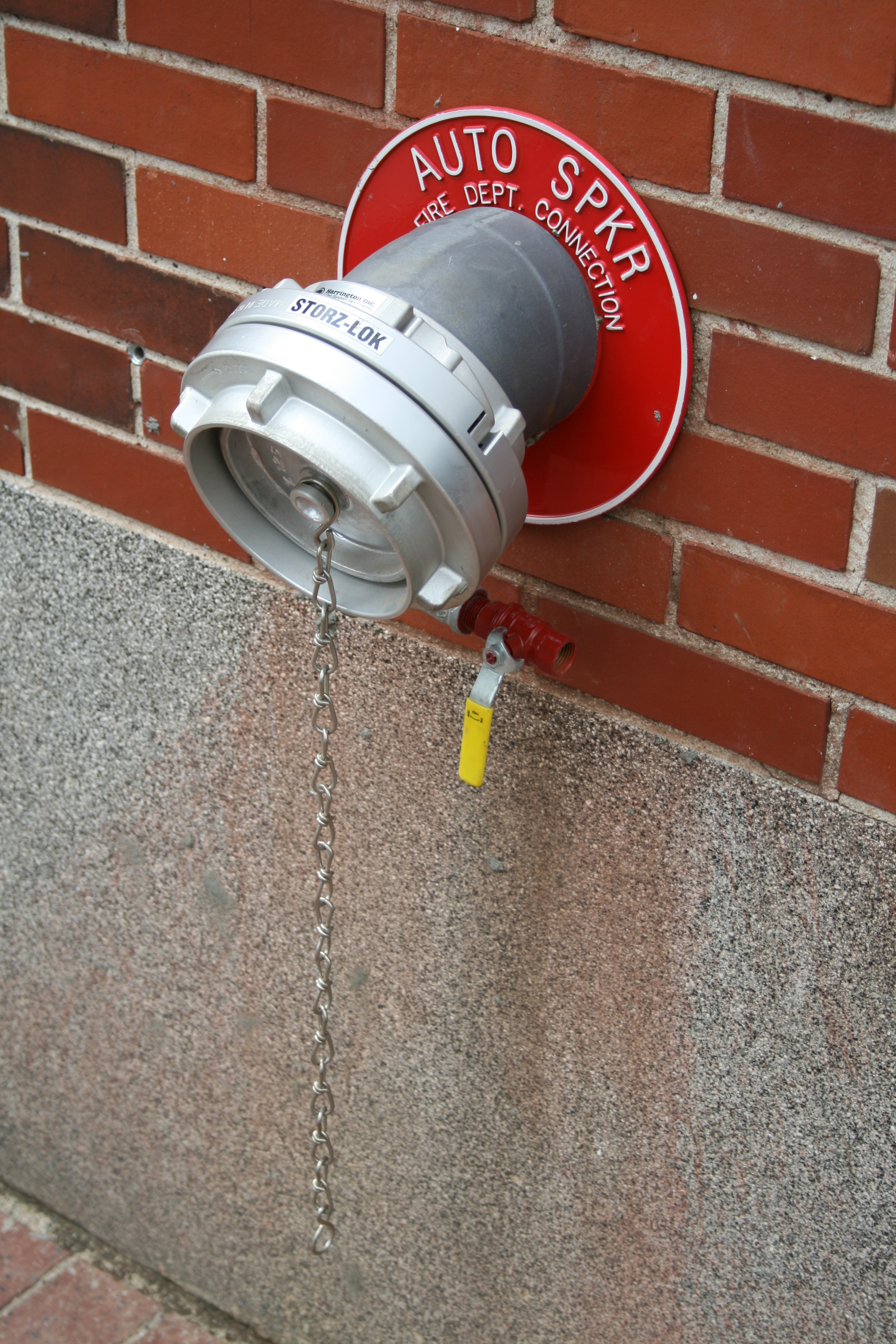
A fire hose building connection in downtown Durham, North Carolina, U.S.

Despite fire hose and hydrant coupler standardization efforts that date to 1873, 153 years ago, there remain significant areas in North America that use fire hose and hydrant threads and other couplings that are incompatible with those used by neighboring fire departments, which can cause issues during mutual aid scenarios.

== Background ==
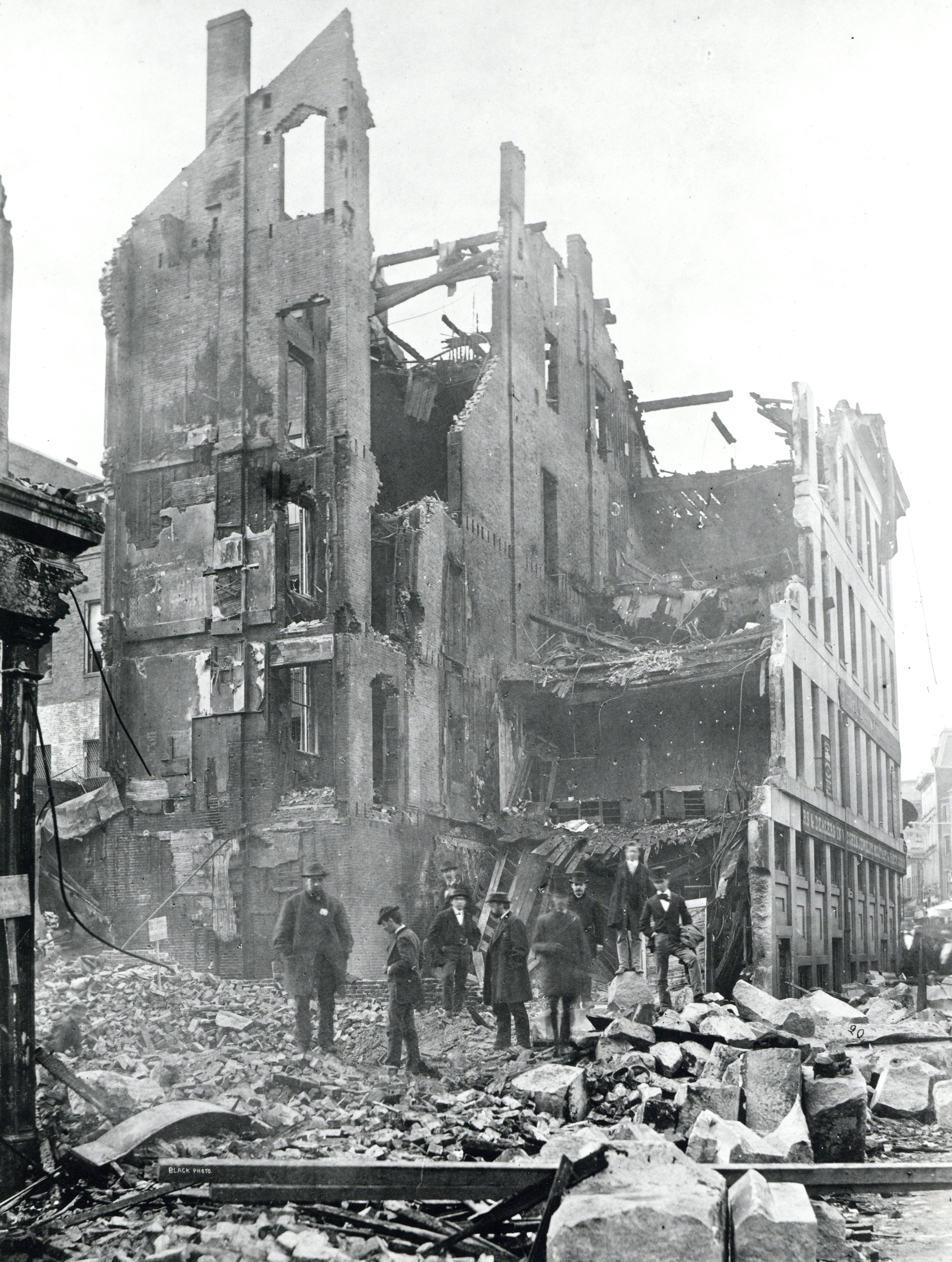
A destroyed building following the Great Boston Fire of 1872, during which hydrant coupling inconsistencies hampered firefighting efforts

The first fire hydrant was invented by Manhattan fire fighter George Smith in 1817, making these devices 209 years old. Despite the two-century history of hydrants, hoses, and hose couplings, incompatibilities still exist between some fire departments in Canada, the United States, and Mexico. These incompatibilities have led to well-documented loss of life and buildings, including the Great Boston Fire of 1872, the Great Baltimore Fire in 1904, and the Oakland firestorm of 1991. As of 2017, the San Francisco Fire Department still maintained fire hydrants with a size and threading that were incompatible with those used by most or all other nearby fire departments that would respond in mutual aid conditions, such as occurred during the 1989 Loma Prieta earthquake.

As a result of the 1872 Boston fire, the International Association of Fire Engineers designed and published a fire hydrant coupling standard. As a result of the 1904 Baltimore fire, the National Fire Protection Association (NFPA) formed a committee, and in 1905 published its first report on the subject, which would eventually become an official standard, NFPA 1963. This standard specified that each fire hydrant have one large diameter pumper (a.k.a. "steamer") port 4 1/2 inches (11 cm) in diameter with four threads per inch (meant for supplying water to a pumper truck or other high-capacity distribution device), and two medium-diameter ports, each 2 1/2 inches (6.4 cm) in diameter with 7.5 threads per inch, meant for supplying individual attack hoses directly.

During at least two periods, specialized thread-adjusting tool sets were developed to enable fire departments using diameters and threads similar to but incompatible with the NFPA standard to convert them to the national standard. The first of these was used around 1911, developed by the Greenfield Tap and Die Corporation, and documented as late as 1922, wherein it was claimed that the 70% of municipalities not already using the NFPA standard threads could convert their couplings to the new standard. Around 1950, San Diego Battalion Chief and Master Fire Mechanic Robert Ely developed a similar machine, now known as the "Ely Fire Hose Thread Standardizer" that could do the job in 90 seconds.

One of the reasons for the incompatibilities is that there are three U.S. national hose threaded hose coupling standards: NFPA 1963, which defines the vast majority of fire hose couplings in existence; ANSI-ASME B1.20.7, which defines garden hose thread (sometimes used by wildland fire fighting crews) along with (non-tapered) iron pipe thread; (Note: Straight iron pipe thread is a temporary connection and seals with a gasket, just like garden hose threads and fire hose threads, and is distinct from tapered iron pipe thread (NPT), which is a permanent connection sealed by the threads in conjunction with pipe dope or teflon tape wrapped around the threads. However, because the straight and tapered iron pipe threads differ only in their taper, it is possible for small NPSH/SIPT female hose couplings in sizes 1/2 inches to 4 inches (inclusive) to be joined to NPT male pipe ends. The connection uses a gasket to seal, and is temporary.) and ANSI B26, which defines screw threads for fire hose couplings with diameters of 2 1/2 to 4 1/2 inches (6.4 to 11.4 cm). (Note: The title of the ANSI B26 specification is "FIRE-HOSE COUPLING SCREW THREAD FOR ALL CONNECTIONS HAVING NOMINAL INSIDE DIAMETERS OF 2 1/2, 3, 3 1/2, AND 4 1/2 INCHES".)

== Standards ==
- ANSI/ASME B1.20.7-1991
- ANSI B26
- NFPA 1901
- NFPA 1963 (old name NFPA 194)
- NFPA 1964 Spray Nozzles
- USDA Specification 5100-107d: "USDA Forest Service Specification for Fire Hose Connections and Fittings"
- USDA 5100-192 (19 mm, 25 mm, 38 mm, and 64 mm hose sizes.)
- CAN/ULC-S551-13 (25 mm and 38 mm forged couplers)
- CAN/ULC-S558-13 (25 mm and 38 mm non-forged couplers)
- UL 19 Standard for Lined Fire Hose and Hose Assemblies

=== Abbreviations ===
- National Hose Thread is abbreviated NH or NHT
- National Pipe Straight Hose is abbreviated NPSH (defined by ASME; same as SIPT, compatible with NPT threads when using a gasket)
- National Pipe Tapered Thread is abbreviated NPT or NPTF
- National Pipe Straight Mechanical is abbreviated NPSM
- Straight Iron Pipe Thread is abbreviated SIPT (same as NPSH)
- Garden Hose Thread is abbreviated GHT, but its official designation is NH (for National Hose, because it shares its origin with fire hose, but is no longer part of the fire hose coupler standard)
- General Iron Pipe Straight Thread is abbreviated IPS

=== NFPA 1963-specified metric equivalents ===
- 3/4-inch hose/coupling = 19 mm
- 1-inch hose/coupling = 25 mm
- 1 1/2-inch hose/coupling = 38 mm
- 2-inch hose/coupling = 52 mm
- 2 1/2-inch hose/coupling = 65 mm
- 3-inch hose/coupling = 75 mm
- 3 1/2-inch hose/coupling = 90 mm
- 4-inch hose/coupling = 100 mm
- 4 1/2-inch hose/coupling = 114 mm
- 5-inch hose/coupling = 125 mm
- 6-inch hose/coupling = 150 mm
- 8-inch hose/coupling = 200 mm

=== Garden hose ===
- 1/2-inch hose with 3/4-11.5NH ASME threads (3/4-11.5NHR for rolled threads)
- 5/8-inch hose with 3/4-11.5NH ASME threads (3/4-11.5NHR for rolled threads)
- 3/4-inch hose with 3/4-11.5NH ASME threads (3/4-11.5NHR for rolled threads)

=== Booster hose ===
According to NFPA 1963, all nozzles used on booster hose shall have the 1-8 NH standard thread.

- 1/2-inch hose with 1/2-14NPSH ASME threads
- 3/4-inch hose with 3/4-14NPSH ASME threads
- 3/4-inch hose with 0.75-8 NH NFPA threads (NFPA 1963 requirement)
- 3/4-inch hose with 1-8 NH NFPA threads (NFPA 1963 requirement)
- 1-inch hose with 1-8 NH NFPA threads (NFPA 1963 requirement; a.k.a. "Chemical Hose Thread" and "Booster Hose Thread"; the chemical hose thread term likely originates from its use on chemical fire engines, an early firefighting device used from 1872 until the 1930s that used a combination of bicarbonate of soda and sulfuric acid to force water from the tank into the hose). The 1933 report of the National Screw Thread Commission mentions 3/4-inch hose and 1-inch hose on the same line, labeling them "Chemical engine and booster hose", with the other sizes labeled "Fire-protection hose".
- 1-inch hose with 1–11.5NPSH ASME threads
- 1 1/4-inch hose with 1 1/4-11.5NPSH ASME threads
- 1 1/2-inch hose with 1.5-9 NH NFPA threads (NFPA 1963 requirement, but not commonly used in the U.S. or Canada)
- 1 1/2-inch hose with 1 1/2-11.5NPSH ASME threads instead of NFPA threads in the U.S. and Canada, without any regulation specifying its use, and contrary to NFPA 1963. This is perhaps a direct result of the 1918 War Industries Board recommendation noted above, combined with 1 1/2-inch 1.5-9 NH NFPA couplings not being standardized until 1957.
- 1 3/4-inch with 1.5-9 NH NFPA threads (NFPA 1963 requirement)

=== Forestry hose ===
The following hose and coupler combinations are used in U.S. wildland fire fighting.

- 3/4-inch hose with 3/4-11.5NH ASME threads (Garden Hose Thread)
- 3/4-inch hose with 3/4-14NPSH ASME threads (USDA 5100-107d specification)
- 3/4-inch hose with Forestry Coupling (CAN/ULC-S551-13 specification and USDA 5100-192 specification)
- 1-inch hose with Forestry Coupling (CAN/ULC-S551-13 specification and USDA 5100-192 specification)
- 1-inch hose with 1–11.5NPSH ASME threads (USDA 5100-107d specification)
- 1-inch hose with 1-8 NH NFPA threads (NFPA 1963 requirement, a.k.a. Chemical Hose Thread)
- 1 1/2-inch hose with 1 1/2-11.5NPSH ASME threads (USDA 5100-107d specification)
- 1 1/2-inch hose with 1.5-9 NH NFPA threads (USDA 5100-107d specification and NFPA 1963 requirement, but not in common use)
- 1 1/2-inch hose with Forestry Coupling (CAN/ULC-S551-13 specification and USDA 5100-192 specification)
- 2-inch hose with 1 1/2-11.5NPSH ASME threads (USDA 5100-107d specification, but not in common use)
- 2 1/2-inch hose with 2 1/2-8NPSH ASME threads (USDA 5100-107d specification, but not in common use)
- 2 1/2-inch hose with 2.5-7.5 NH NFPA threads (USDA 5100-107d specification and NFPA 1963 requirement)
- 2 1/2-inch hose with Forestry Coupling (USDA 5100-192 specification, but only in use near the Canadian border)
- 4-inch hose with 4.5-4 NH NFPA threads

=== Attack line hose ===
- 2 1/2-inch hose with 2.5-7.5 NH NFPA threads (NFPA 1963 requirement)
- 3-inch hose with 2.5-7.5 NH NFPA threads (NFPA 1963 requirement)
- 3-inch hose with 3-6 NH NFPA threads (not commonly used in the U.S.)
- 3-inch hose with 3-8NPSH ASME threads
- 3 1/2-inch hose with 3.5-6 NH NFPA threads (NFPA 1963 requirement)
- 3 1/2-inch hose with 3 1/2-8NPSH ASME threads

=== Fire hydrant ports ===
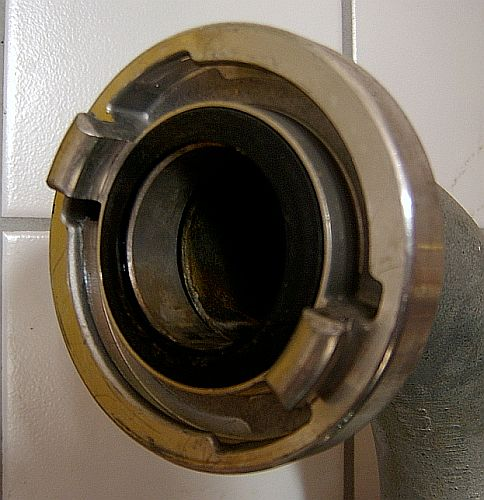
A Storz connector

According to NFPA 1963, all U.S. fire hydrants should have the following ports:

- 2 1/2-inch attack port with 2.5-7.5 NH threads (two ports per hydrant; NFPA 1963 requirement)
- 4 1/2-inch pumper (steamer) port with either 4.5-4 NH threads or a 5-inch Storz port (one port per hydrant; NFPA 1963 requirement)

=== Suction hose ===
Standard length is 10 feet (3.0 m). Normal flat hoses can't be used for suction because they would collapse; instead, these hoses are made of hard rubber with internal metal reinforcement or corrugated (scalloped) plastic.

Additionally, suction hose requires the use of suction gaskets to prevent air from entering, which are not used on other types of hoses, which use gaskets that seal with the addition of water pressure (and sometimes leak when not enough pressure is present).

- 2 1/2-inch attack port with 2.5-7.5 NH threads
  - Used as a secondary suction port on most fire engines, when the volume provided by a larger diameter hose is not needed but the flexibility of a smaller hose is
- 4-inch hose with 4-inch Storz (100 mm) couplings
- 5-inch hose with 5-inch Storz (125 mm) couplings
  - Commonly carried on U.S. fire engines to pull water from fire hydrants for distribution with the engine's on-board pump. Some of these hoses will have Storz to 4.5-4 NH thread adapters (often with wide handles) already connected to them, in order to facilitate connection to fire hydrants without Storz ports (likely the vast majority of hydrants in the U.S.)

=== Supply line hose ===
- 4-inch hose with 4-4 NH NFPA threads (NFPA 1963 requirement)
- 4-inch hose with 4-inch Storz (100 mm) couplings (allowed by NFPA 1963)
- 4-inch hose with 4.5-4 NH NFPA threads
- 4-inch hose with 4-8NPSH ASME threads
- 5-inch hose with 5-4 NH NFPA threads (NFPA 1963 requirement)
- 5-inch hose with 5-inch Storz (125 mm) couplings (allowed by NFPA 1963)
- 6-inch hose with 6-4 NH NFPA threads (NFPA 1963 requirement, but not commonly used in the U.S.)
- 8-inch hose with 8-4 NH NFPA threads (NFPA 1963 requirement, but not commonly used in the U.S.; only added to NFPA 1963 in the 2003 edition)

Non-standard hose couplings

The fire hose threads that don't conform to NFPA 1963 or ULC-S551-13 include:

- 1 1/2-inch NPSH threads (used in Canada and the U.S.)
- 1 1/2-inch BSP (British Standard Pipe Thread; OD: 1.882 inches; pitch: 11)
- 1 1/2-inch NST (NH and NST and ANSI thread; OD: 1.990 inches; pitch: 11)
- 2" Underwriter Tip (OD: 2.187 inches; TPI: 8)
- 2 1/2-inch BCST (British Columbia Standard Thread; OD: 2.990 inches; pitch: 8)
- 2 1/2-inch Ontario (Canadian Standards Association; OD: 3.125 inches; pitch: 5)
- 2 1/2-inch Nova Scotia - zone 1 (OD: 3.234 inches; pitch: 5)
- 2 1/2-inch QST and QMT Quebec/Montreal Combination Thread (OD: 3.031 inches; pitch: 7)
- 2 1/2-inch Sask. & Manitoba (Western Canada Fire Underwriters Association; OD: 3.250 inches; pitch: 6)
- 2 1/2-inch BSP (British Standard Pipe Thread; OD: 2.956 inches; pitch 11)
- 2 1/2-inch NST (NH and NST and ANSI thread; OD: 3.068 inches; pitch: 7.5)
- 3-inch Cincinnati, OH (OD: 3.078 inches; TPI: 6)
- 3-inch Cleveland, OH (OD: 3.062 inches, TPI: 8)
- 3-inch Pittsburgh, PA (OD: 3.062 inches; TPI: 6)
- 3-inch Detroit, MI (OD: 3.125 inches; TPI: 7.5)
- 3-inch Denver, CO (OD: 3.092 inches; TPI: 8)
- 3-inch Omaha, NE (OD: 3.078 inches; TPI 8)
- 3-inch Salt Lake City, UT (OD: 3.250 inches; TPI: 8)
- 3-inch Toledo, OH (OD: 3.000 inches, TPI: 8)

In addition, these major U.S. areas have their own standards (sometimes two standards per city) for 3/4-inch through 6-inch fire hose threads:

- Eastern Hose Thread
- New York Corporation
- New York City Fire Department
- Chicago Hose Thread (Crane Standard)
- Chicago Fire Department
- Pittsburgh Gauge Hose Thread
- Pacific Coast Thread
  - was originally developed by Valley Foundry of Fresno, California. They were designed primarily as hose fittings used in the wine industries.

== Timeline of hose coupling design ==
These are all of the major international fire hose couplings, in order of definition or first use.

Date	Coupler	Country	First standard	First patent
1870s	2.5" Pin Lug	U.S.		
1890	Storz	Germany	DIN 14301, etc.	
1890	Garden Hose Thread	U.S.	ANSI-ASME B1.20.7	
1928	Instantaneous	Britain	BS 336:1928	
1932	GEKA	Germany		
1955	Hozelock	Britain		
1968	Machino	Japan	JIS B9911	
1977	Forestry Coupling	Canada	CAN/ULC-S551	
	UNI	Italy		
<1980	Camlock	U.S.	Mil-C-27487	
1981	Nakajima	Japan	JIS F7335	
1981	Barcelona	Spain	UNE 23400-1:1981	
	DSP	France	NFS 61 704:1966	Raccord Symeetrique Auto-Etanches DSP (Fire Fighting Equipment - Self-sealing Symmetrical Half Couplings, Sizes 40 And 65)
	AR	France	NFS 61-705:2008	For Suction and discharge.
	Guillemin	France	NF E 29-572	
	Norlas	Norway		
	Nunan & Stove	Russia		
	ROTTA	Russia		
	SFS	Finland		
	SMS	Sweden		
	LFB/LRT			
	KR/NS			
	Fronape	Brazil		

== Timeline of North American fire hose coupler standards ==
The content in this table is based on a compilation of all the sources cited in this article, plus the NFPA Technical Committee Report of 1967, "Report of Committee on Fire Department Equipment".

ANSI/ASME B1.7M-1984

ASME B1.7-2006: Screw Threads: Nomenclature, Definitions, and Letter Symbols.

Date	Couplers	Event
1673 or 1693		First ever fire hose developed in Amsterdam. Suction hose also invented by same person.
1794		Sewn leather fire hose developed in Philadelphia
1807		Rivited fire hose developed in Philadelphia
1817		First fire hydrant designed by George Smith.
1820		First standardized pipe threads created by Robert Briggs
1821		First patent for woven, rubber-lined fire hose
1838		U.S. Patent number 909 for fire hydrant issued to John M. Jorden of Baltimore, MD.
1841		Sir Joseph Whitworth helps standardize threads in the U.K.
c. 1860		Fire hydrant steamer port developed
1864		William Sellers helps standardize threads in the U.S., through the Franklin Institute. The expansion of railroads was the primary driver of the standardization.
1866		Briggs Standard of U.S. pipe threads created as first nationwide pipe thread standard.
1870		U.S. Patent number 99646 for fire hydrant issued to James Curran of Baltimore, MD. First documented use of twin steamer ports.
1872-11-09		Great Boston Fire kills 13 (Eclipsing the others from 1653, 1676, 1679, 1682, 1691, 1711, and 1753). Neighboring cities adopt Boston's "Roxbury thread" coupling in the aftermath.
1873		International Association of Fire Engineers (now the International Association of Fire Chiefs) proposes standardization, using a coupling with 7 1/2 threads per inch.
1876 or 1878	2 1/2-inch, 8 tpi	The fourth annual convention of the National Association of Fire Engineers adopts a resolution calling for 2 1/2-inch hose couplings with 8 threads per inch. The United States Congress took some action and threatened penalties. (This may be the NPSH thread.)
1879	2 1/2-inch, 6 tpi, flat threads	The 7th annual convention of the National Association of Fire Engineers adopts a resolution calling for 2 1/2-inch hose couplings with 6 threads per inch and 3 13/64" OD, because it was the thread least liable to become damaged, the most easily handled, and least likely to become fouled with dirt or gravel.
1882		Robert Briggs formulates the Briggs pipe standard threads. Briggs was superintendent of the Pascal Iron Works of Morris, Tasker & Co., Philadelphia, and later was engineering editor of the Journal of the Franklin Institute. After his death, a paper by Mr. Briggs containing detailed information regarding American Pipe and Pipe-Thread practice was read before the Institution of Civil Engineers of Great Britain.
1886		ASME adopts Briggs pipe thread as the U.S. standard.
1890		Possibly the first garden hose spray nozzle manufactured by W. D. Allen Mfg. Co of Chicago, IL.
1890		Storz coupling patented in Germany.
1890		Garden Hose Thread first manufactured
1891	2 5/8, 2 3/4, 3, 3 1/2, 4, 4 1/2, 5, and 6 inches; all 8 tpi	The National Association of Fire Engineers adopts a resolution calling for the use of 8 different diameters of couplings.
1898		Earliest effort by the NFPA to create fire hose coupling standards.
c.1901		As early as 1901, American Fire Hose Manufacturing was producing a "universal clutch" hose coupler that was used in municipalities around Massachusetts.
1903		U.S. patent number 734251 for fire hydrant issued to Arthur O. Babendreier.
1903		Article in American Machinist, Vol. 26 states the author noted that one of the largest valve manufacturers in the country had no less than 270 different thread gauges for 2 1/2-inch fire hose couplers alone; that a local shop that served only the fire fighting industry had 150 such gauges hanging on its wall; and that in 1899 Pratt & Whitney had offered a 2 1/2-inch plug and gauge standard for fire hose fittings, with apparently exactly the later NFPA thread specification, but removed it after 2–3 years because there was no demand.
1904		A study by the NBS reveals there were about 600 sizes and variations in fire-hose couplings across the country. Later this year, the NBS has a small fire on its campus, only to discover the hoses in the North and South buildings had different threads and couldn't be connected.
1904		U.S. War Department adopted a standard Quartermaster's Department fire hose coupling, that proved troublesome and was abandoned even while the standard was still in effect. (1917 proceedings of the NFPA)
1904	2 1/2-inch ID, 3 1/16-inch OD, 7.5 tpi 3, 6 tpi 3 1/2-inch 7.5 tpi 4 1/2-inch, 4 tpi	The International Association of Fire Chiefs' adopted a standard thread for 2 1/2-inch ID fire hose couplings at its annual convention in Duluth, apparently that of the Chicago coupling.
1904-02-07/08		Great Baltimore Fire kills between 0 and 4, depending on sources Caused NFPA to create fire hydrant standard. Neither the Washington, Philadelphia, nor the New York fire engines could make connections with the local fire hydrants.
1905-05-23	2 1/2-inch ID, 3 1/16-inch OD, 7.5 tpi 3, 6 tpi 3 1/2-inch 7.5 tpi 4 1/2-inch, 4 tpi	Using the International Association of Fire Chiefs' earlier report as a starting point, and working in cooperation with the American Water Works Association, an NFPA committee published its first report on the recommended diameter and number of threads per inch for fire hose couplings and fire hydrants. Standard was adopted by the American Water Works Association (1905-05-09), the International Association of Fire Engineers (1905-08-19), the National Firemen's Association (1905-08-30), the New England Waterworks Association (1905-09-14), Pennsylvania Waterworks Association (1905), North Carolina Firemen's State Association (1905–08), National Board of Fire Underwriters (1905-05-23), the Associated Factory Mutual Fire Insurance Companies, and others. 7.5 threads per inch were selected not just as a compromise between the 6, 7, and 8 threads per inch then in use, but because tools and methods had been developed to facilitate the conversion of existing 7 tpi and 8 tpi threads to 7.5 tpi threads, for couplings with an outside diameter ranging from 3 inches to 3 1/8 inches to the new standard ODM of 3 1/16 inches.
1906		Numerous fire departments were surveyed as to their intention of adopting the new standard, with many being reluctant to make the change.
1906-10	2 1/2-inch ID, 3 1/16-inch OD, 7.5 tpi 3, 6 tpi 3 1/2-inch 7.5 tpi 4 1/2-inch, 4 tpi	At its annual convention at Dallas, TX, the NFPA formally adopted a standard with 2 1/2-inch hose with 7.5 threads per inch as the primary standard, with additional sizes of 3 and 3.5 inches (each with 6 threads per inch) and a 4.5 inch coupling with 4 threads per inch, with the fire hydrant standard specifying one 4.5 inch port and two 2.5 inch ports. The standard includes measurements in centimeters in addition to inches.
1910		Around several municipalities in Massachusetts, including Springfield, MA and replaced the Universal Clutch couplings on their hydrants and hose with the new standards.
1911		Specifications of the National Board of Fire Underwriters is the published fire hose coupling standard, as recommended by NFPA.
1913		ASAE adopts the American Briggs Standard, which clarifies female (inside) pipe threads and is compatible with Briggs Standard male (outside) threads. American Pipe-Thread Standard is the same thing.
1913		ASME publishes the NFPA fire hose coupling standard.
1914		NBS publishes the NFPA fire hose coupling standard in Circular No. 50 (first version), and notes that only 287 of the 8,000 cities and towns in the US had fire-hose couplings and hydrant outlets conforming to the standard.
1914-11-25		NBS Circular No. 50 Published
1915		NFPA published "Hose Coupling Record and Specifications"
1916		NFPA began work on smaller hose threads.
1917		NBS publishes an updated version of Circular No. 50.
1917		NBFU takes over the field work of the NFPA
1917		NFPA organizes a committee on small hose couplings to define hose threads for 1/2-inch to 2-inch fittings.
1918		National Screw Thread Commission is formed by an Act of Congress to address thread standards.
1918		Fire Department Supply and Linen Hose Section of the War Industries Board recommended that for the duration of the war "hydrants, hose valves, hose couplings, nipples, and nozzles 1 1/4-inch to 2-inch, inclusive, to be iron pipe thread for new work, hose gauge or special threads only to be used for replacement or extension of existing plant equipment. The adoption of such a standard will result in the elimination of the various so-called hose threads which are used locally in the different sections of the country. Such a standard will also permit repairs or connections being made in the field by the use of wrought iron pipe connections or fittings. It will also result in considerable saving in correspondence and detail now necessary in endeavoring to ascertain what particular 'hose' standard thread is desired."
1919		ASME publishes Manual on American Standard Pipe Threads.
1919-12		The National Board of Fire Underwriters publishes Standardization for Fire Hose Couplings and Fittings pamphlet. Included in its content is a descript of a set of tools devised for the purpose of re-forming proprietary threads to standard size
1920		NFPA publishes a list of local standards for small hose coupling threads, and notes that SIPT had been most widely used since 1894 or earlier. NFPA holds its 24th annual meeting in Chicago... Up until this point, NFPA has only published thread standards for 2 1/2-inch, 3, 3 1/2-inch, and 4 1/2-inch sizes. In its report, it listed multiple criteria for judging thread selection, including interchangeability with existing couplings, battering (rough usage), liability of crossing threads if too fine, and strength. This same report mentions old use of "snap couplings", without providing further details.
1921		National Screw Thread Commission publishes small hose screw couplings, which are incompatible with NFPA's standards (except for garden hose thread). Commission finds that the NFPA fire hose coupling standards specified nominal dimensions only, with no maximum and minimum limits; and also that the 1911 specification should be interpreted as minimum difference in pitch diameter and be classified as loose fit.
1922		NFPA published standards for smaller hose threads.
1924		National Screw Thread Commission updates its small hose screw couplings. Covers "National Fire-Hose Coupling Thread Form" (NFHCT) recommended by NFPA "previously known as National Standard Hose Coupling Thread" and garden hoses (3/4 in.--11 1/2 threads per inch). Small hose couplings (0.5 to 2") use "National Form of Thread". States that "Go" gages are absolutely essential to prevent interference of mating parts, and that "Not Go" gages are essential to prevent excess shake, play, or looseness of mating parts as determined by the extreme component limits. NBFU reports that previous changes to NFPA threads result in fits sometimes looser than good practice warrants, and so the rules about how taps and dies should be produced, so as to avoid that and other problems.
1924		Only 700 of the 8,000 cities and towns in the US had fire-hose couplings and hydrant outlets conforming to the standard.
1925		ASA publishes B26-1925 (later ANSI B26)
1926		ASA publishes NFPA's small hose coupling standard
1927-01		ASME requests ASA to authorize committee to unify the small hose couplings standards.
1928		British Instantaneous Coupling defined as a standard
1928		National Screw Thread Commission updates its small hose screw couplings.
1928		ASME Sectional Committee authorized to create small hose screw couplings. Result is ASA B33.1
1932		2.5 inch coupling made a standard by which group?
1933		The National Screw Thread Commission report states that the American National Fire-Hose Coupling Threads is completed or under effective headway in 36 states, and their use has been made compulsory by State legislative acts in California, Massachusetts, Oregon, and Texas. The report notes that sets of tools for rethreading existing hydrants and hose couplings are commercially available.
1935		American Standards Association publishes ASA B33.1-1935 standard for small hose couplings (1/2-inch to 2").
1955		NFPA published standards for suction hose coupling threads.
1956		NFPA adopts dimensions for gaskets in 3/4 inch to 6 inch couplings
1957-10		1 1/2-inch fire hose couplings were standardized.
1961		The duties of the ASA B26 Sectional Committee were transferred to the newly established Subcommittee No. 7 of ASA Sectional Committee B2 on the Standardization of Pipe Threads, for which the Association of Mechanical Engineers and the American Gas Association were joint sponsors. Subcommittee B2.7 was organized to deal with threads for fire hose couplings and fittings.
1962-10		A meeting was held (by whom?) to discuss the revision of ASA B26 (Fire-Hose Couplings Screw Thread). It was the consensus of the group that the smaller sizes of hose coupling threads now shown in ASA B33.1 (which is to be renumbered B2.4) that were used for fire protection should be included in B2.3 (revised B26. The present B2.3 includes all American (National) Standard Fire-Hose Coupling Threads except for the Garden Hose Threads which will be shown in ASA B2.4.
1966-09		The NFPA Sectional Committee on Fire Hose votes to revise NFPA 194–1963 to include the new material provided by the B2.7 subcommittee.
1967		The NFPA approves the revisions to NFPA 194–1963 at its annual meeting.
1968		Japan standardizes the Machino coupling
1977		Canada defines a quarter-turn forestry fire hose coupling
1991-10-19/20		Oakland firestorm of 1991, 25 killed
1993		NFPA published standard for 4- and 5-inch Storz (nonthreaded) couplers.
2004-08-01		NIST publishes NISTIR 7158 report stating that 100 years after the Baltimore Fire, only 18 out of the 48 most populated U.S. cities have installed national standard fire hydrants
