= Mulholland Formation =

Geologic formation in the San Francisco Bay area

- Stratigraphic range: Pliocene epoch Neogene Period
- Type: Geologic formation
- Underlies: Leona Rhyolite
- Overlies: Bald Peak Basalt

Lithology
- Primary: siltstone, sandstone, conglomerates

Location
- Region: Berkeley Hills and San Leandro Hills, Alameda County and Contra Costa County, California
- Country: United States

Type section
- Named for: William Mulholland

The Mulholland Formation is a Pliocene epoch geologic formation in the Berkeley Hills and San Leandro Hills of the East Bay region of the San Francisco Bay Area, California. It is found within Alameda County and Contra Costa County.

== Geology ==
It overlies the Bald Peak Basalt formation, and underlies the Pleistocene epoch Leona Rhyolite formation. It is composed of siltstone, sandstone, and conglomerates. It has fluviatile and lacustrine deposits.

Descending under the Bald Peak Basalt formation are the Pliocene epoch units of the Siesta Formation, Moraga Formation, and Orinda Formation. Below the Orinda are the local Miocene epoch units of the Monterey Formation Group: Tice Shale, Oursan Sandstone, Claremont Shale, and Sobrante Sandstone.

=== Fossils ===
The Mulholland Formation preserves fossils dating back to the Neogene period.

=== Other local formations ===
- Units of other local formations in the Berkeley and San Leandro Hills, in descending geologic column order from higher/younger to lower/older, include:

- Local Late/Upper Cretaceous−Pliocene units of the Chico Formation:

- Redwood Canyon Formation — sandstone, shale, and conglomerate.
- Shephard Creek Formation — shale and sandstone.
- Oakland Conglomerate — conglomerate, exposed on Skyline Boulevard.
- Joaquin Miller Formation — sandstone, shale, and conglomerate.
- Knoxville Conglomerate

== See also ==
- Pliocene geology in California
- List of fossiliferous stratigraphic units in California
- Paleontology in California
