= Claremont Canyon Regional Preserve =

Park in California, United States

Coordinates: 37.865203°N 122.225801°W

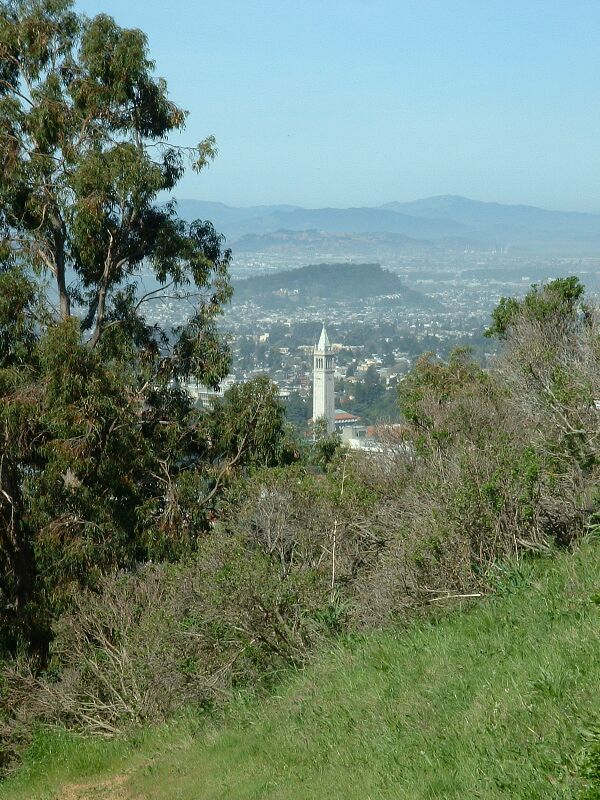
- View from Claremont Canyon Regional Preserve. March 13, 2004. The University of California, Berkeley's Sather Tower is in the near view. Behind that is Albany Hill, and the large mountains in the background are the Marin Hills.

- Location within Oakland, California Location within California Location within the United States
- Type: Regional park
- Location: Oakland, California
- Area: 205 acres (83 ha)
- Created: 1978
- Operator: East Bay Regional Park District
- Status: Open

Claremont Canyon Regional Preserve is a small regional park administered by the East Bay Regional Park District located in Alameda County, California as a section of the city of Oakland, California and the larger East Bay Hills of the San Francisco Bay Area. The 208-acre park is named after the expansive canyon in which it is situated, Claremont Canyon, out of which Claremont Creek flows on its way to its confluence with Temescal Creek. Previously the canyon was called Harwood's Canyon, and then later as Telegraph Canyon. The name was changed to Claremont by a developer of the nearby Claremont district. The Claremont Canyon Regional Preserve is rich in geology and plant communities, although there is a history of wildfires in the overarching Canyon. Its activities for visitors primarily include two main hiking trails, although access to the park is mostly limited by foot.

== History of The Canyon ==
Claremont Canyon was part of an 1820 Spanish land grant called Rancho San Antonio. It was used as a transportation route by Americans from the eastern United States. In 1858, a transcontinental telegraph line was built through the canyon. Starting in the 1860s, the Pony Express carried mail through the canyon to and from the eastern part of the United States.

EBRPD first bought an 80 acres (32 ha) parcel of surplus state land east of the U.C. Berkeley campus in 1978. Then it acquired some more acreage in the immediate area from several individuals. Finally, it bought a 64 acres (26 ha) parcel in Gwin Canyon. These acquisitions were combined to become Claremont Canyon Regional Preserve.

=== Indigenous Activity ===
An important note is that the Canyon was not originally owned by the Spanish or American settlers. The reserve is located in the homeland of the Huchiun people, an Ohlone-speaking group who managed the landscape to support its plant and animal communities.The Huchiun Ohlone were the first inhabitants of the area, as they lived in a range from current day Richmond to south Oakland, including the Canyon. Beyond a simple home, the Canyon also served as a travel route for the Huchiun, connecting them to valleys in the east and other indigneous groups.

=== Conservation and Fire History ===
Major wildfires reached part of the Claremont Canyon in 1923, 1970, and 1991, overwhelming local firefighting and destroying homes across the Oakland-Berkeley Hills. While wildfires are a part of California, the Canyon’s specific formation contributes to its vulnerability. Sitting at one of the lowest points along the Oakland-Berkeley ridge, the Canyon is a natural channel for the hot, dry east to west “Diablo” winds that can go up to 50 miles per hour. These winds can rapidly spread flames and carry burning debris, and given the Bay Area’s history of frequent droughts, have caused mega-fires. This occurred in the 1991 Oakland Hills Fire, when a small brush fire was put out and reignited the next day by the Diablo Winds, leading to immense spreading and thousands of acres being burned through.

Eucalyptus plantations established in the Canyon during the early twentieth century also became a focus of fire-management efforts. Many of these plantations were abandoned after eucalyptus proved to be unfit for the lumber market. This left large areas of land unmanaged, and debris such as fallen leaves or shed bark began to accumulate under the trees, adding much flammable material. Following the 1991 fire, organizations pursued the removal of such vegetation as well as the restoration of native habitats as fire-management tools to conserve and protect the canyon from the possibility of wildfires.

== General description ==
Despite its small size of 205 acres (83 ha), Claremont Canyon Regional Preserve forms an important link in the chain of parks that line the Berkeley Hills. It rises from a height of about 420 ft (130 m) above sea level, just behind the Clark Kerr campus of the University of California, Berkeley to the average 1300 ft (400 m) ridge of the East Bay hills, linking by way of other conserved land belonging to the university and the East Bay Municipal Utility District to other parks such as Tilden Regional Park and Sibley Volcanic Regional Preserve. It thus offers direct pedestrian access to the park system, with connections to public transportation, from the lower-lying residential areas of Berkeley and Oakland.

== Geology ==
Claremont Canyon is located in a geologically active region where the Pacific and North American tectonic plates meet. While it is the largest underdeveloped canyon on the Oakland/Berkely Hill’s western side, geologically there is lots of activity. A vast majority of the Canyon’s rocks originated hundreds of miles south of their current location and have gradually shifted northward along the faults separating the two plates. The canyon contains three distinct geological formations, the riverine Orinda Formation, volcanic Moraga Formation, and the oldest of which is the Claremont Formation, dating back 10 to 15 million years. The Regional Preserve is located within the Claremont Formation, also known as the Claremont Chert.

The “Chert Wall” is one of the best visual examples of this geological formation. It is a marine sedimentary rock that formed in a hemipelagic environment, an ocean basin located between shallow coastal waters and the deep sea. It primarily consists of chert, a hard, fine-grained rock, along wiht softer layers of shale and mudstone. The chert is largely composed of silica-rich skeletal remains of microscopic marine organisms.

== Plant Communities ==
Claremont Canyon encompasses a variety of plant and habitat communities, both native and introduced. It contains a mix of coastal scrub, oak-bay woodland, grassland, and creekside habitats. These habitats are found across the broader canyon, including the regional preserve. Redwood groves can also be found in the canyon, containing both older and recently planted trees. Eucalyptus stands have been planted in the area throughout the years, though many local residents now are concerned they may pose a fire hazard.

=== Coastal Scrub ===
Coastal scrub, also called soft chaparral, is an open, lowland habitat with growing shrubs and patches of grass. It is an important part of the preserve, housing coyote brush, French broom, lupine, monkeyflower brush, and California coastal sagebrush.

==== French Broom ====
French Broom is an invasive, evergreen shrub and the most widespread broom species in California. It usually stands around 10 feet (3 meters) tall, although some plants can reach up to 16 feet (5 meters) in height. It features a dense, green, and erect stem covered in fine, silvery hairs, and it produces compound leaves and small, yellow, and clustered flowers. It is Native to the Azores and Mediterranean region, and it is believed to have been brought to the San Francisco Bay around the mid 1800s for garden usage. The plant is now a commonly found invasive species to the regional preserve.

California Sagebrush

California sagebrush is a fast-growing native shrub with multiple woody stems, reaching from two feet to five feet in height. The leaves are narrow, strongly scented, and between 2 and 5 inches long, with smaller side branches growing from the main stems. It is native to California and northwestern Baja California, including several Channel Islands. It grows primarily in the coastal sage scrub habitat, as well as some chaparral areas. It can be found on coastal plains, foothills, and mountain slopes. Its range extends from the San Francisco Bay Area south to around El Rosario, Baja California, and is a common shrub of the Claremont Canyon.

=== Oak-bay Woodland ===
Oak-bay Woodland is a shaded habitat with coast live oak and California bay trees, along with ferns and other small plants growing beneath them. It forms part of the mixed habitats in the preserve throughout the watershed, including woodland in Garber Park.

Redwood

Redwood grove is a native, evergreen tree that can be found in the canyon, containing both older and recently planted trees. It can live for periods longer than 2,200 years, and it commonly grows over 200 feet (61 meters) tall, with many trees reaching over 300 feet (91 meters). Its bark can reach 12 inches in thickness, and its roots spread without a main taproot. Redwood produces light seeds that are spread by wind, and it can also grow new shoots from its stump or root crown. It is native to the coastal areas of northern California and southwestern Oregon. It grows primarily in areas with rainy winters and dry summers, where coastl fog helps provide moisture. It can be found on coastal plains, along streams, and in areas with moist soil. It can be found in the canyon, containing both older and recently planted trees.

Eucalyptus

The Eucalyptus is a tree originally found in Australian forests. The plant was brought to California in the 19th century during the Gold rush and planted for reforestation, building, and timber. Eucalyptus stands have been planted in the area throughout the years, though many local residents now are concerned they may pose a fire hazard. It can grow up to 180 feet (55 meters) tall. The young leaves are oal shaped and have blueish green coloring, while mature leaves are cured and have a grayish blue-green tone. In California, it usually flowers from November to April. It grows well in mild climates and is more likely to spread in coastal areas where rainfall or fog provide it moisture. The non-native and highly flammable species can be found throughout the preserve and have been major contributers to wildfires in the area. Eucalyptus stands have been planted in the area throughout the years, though many local residents now are concerned they may pose a fire hazard.

=== Grassland and Creekside vegetation ===
Grasslands and creekside vegetation form part of the mix of habitats in the preserve. Grasslands cover open areas, while plants such as the arroyo willow and stinging nettle grow by the creek in the Telegraph Canyon, a branch of the Claremont Canyon that crossed into the regional preserve.

== Activities ==
Activities include hiking, dog walking, and horseback riding. Visitors can also observe the wildlife located throughout the preserve, including black-tailed deer, coyotes, gray foxes, and red-tailed hawks. The park district provides plant checklists and photo guides for identifying plants found in the canyon. The preserve is relatively undeveloped and offers few almost no amenities to visitors other than two hiking trails: Stonewall Panoramic Trail and Gwin Canyon Trail.

=== Stonewall Panoramic Trail ===
The Stonewall Panoramic Trail begins at a parking area on Stonewall Road, behind the historic Claremont Hotel. The trail is 1.6 miles (2.6 km) long and ascends 700 feet (210 m). The steep path up to the ridge gives splendid views across the cities of Berkeley and Oakland, and beyond to San Francisco Bay, the Golden Gate Bridge and San Francisco. On clear days, especially in winter, the Farallon Islands, about 44 miles (70 km) away, can be seen beyond the Golden Gate.

=== Gwin Canyon Trail ===
Within the Preserve is a side canyon called Gwin Canyon with a 2-mile (3.2 km) trail accessible from the end of Norfolk Road near Strathmoor Drive in the Oakland Hills. The trail ends just above Claremont Creek, 0.6 miles (0.97 km) from the trailhead.

While the upper reaches of Claremont Canyon are technically outside the Preserve, there are an additional 225 acres (0.91 km^{2}) of open space contiguous to it owned and managed by the University of California. A local non-profit citizens' organization, the Claremont Canyon Conservancy, works with the public landowners offering stewardship services and educational programs.

== Access ==
There is very little public parking available either within or very near the preserve. The main entrance is on Stonewall Road, off Claremont Avenue, where street parking is limited. Another entrance is located at the top of Panoramic Way, where street parking is mostly prohibited. The Gwin Canyon entrance is at the end of Norfolk Road, where parking is also very limited. Visitors can reach the preserve on foot from nearby streets or through connecting trails on University of California, Berkeley property. Public transit provides another great option, with bus stops near the preserve on Claremont Avenue, Belrose Avenue, and lastly Garber Road.

== See also ==
- Claremont Shale — Miocene epoch geologic formation in area.
- Claremont, Oakland/Berkeley, California
