= Moraga Formation =

Pliocene geological formation in California

Moraga Formation (Moraga Volcanics)
- Stratigraphic range: Pliocene epoch
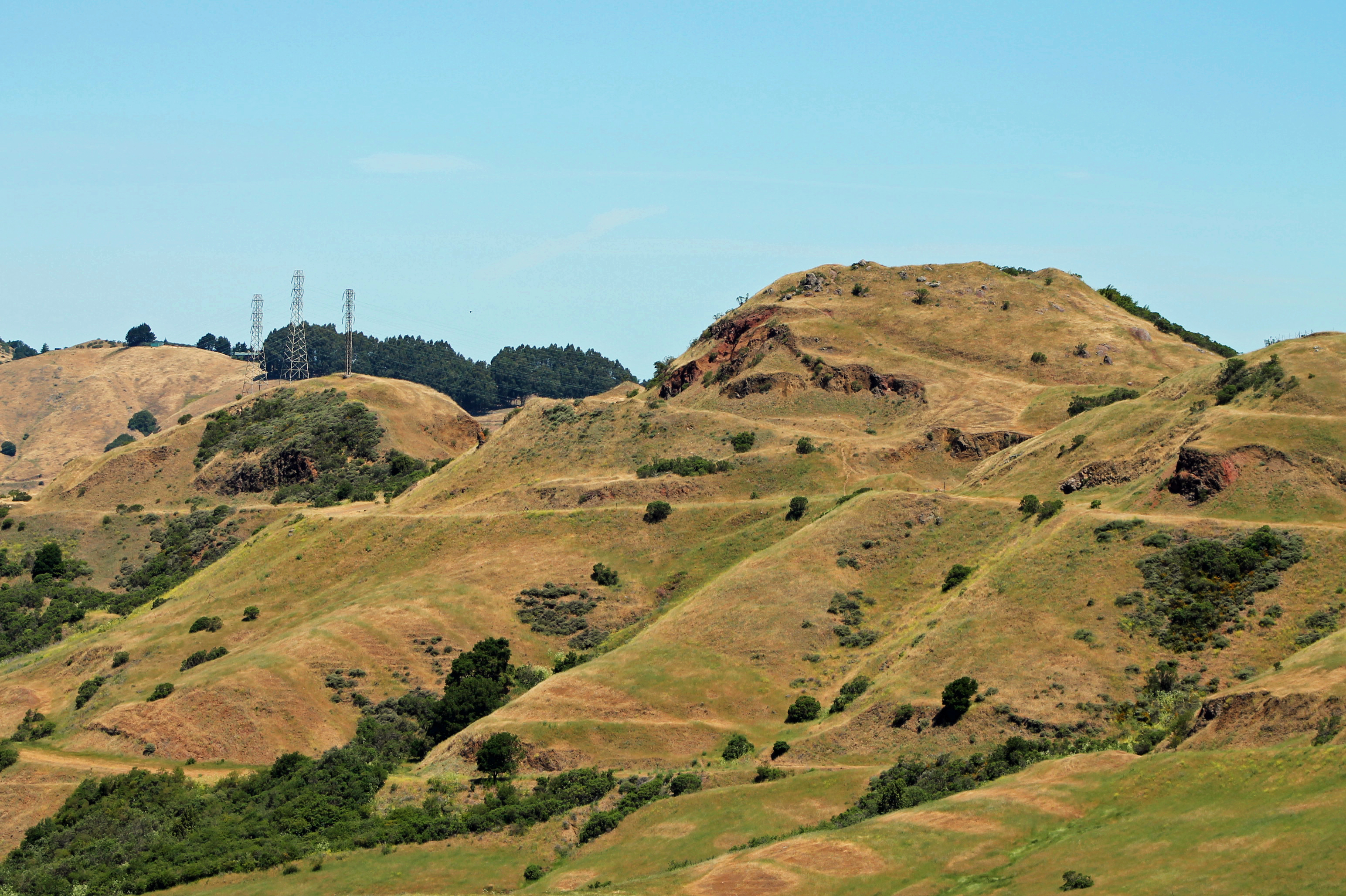
- Moraga Volcanics in Robert Sibley Volcanic Regional Preserve, Berkeley Hills
- Type: Geologic formation
- Underlies: Siesta Formation
- Overlies: Orinda Formation
- Thickness: 1,200 feet (370 m)

Lithology
- Primary: Basaltic lava, with andesite, basalt, rhyolite tuff
- Other: Clay, conglomerate, limestone

Location
- Region: Berkeley Hills, Alameda County and Contra Costa County, California
- Country: United States

Type section
- Named for: Moraga Valley

The Moraga Formation, also known as the Moraga Volcanics, is a geological formation that dates back to the Pliocene epoch. It is located in Berkeley Hills, East Bay Region, San Francisco Bay Area, California.

The basaltic lava flow formation is found within Alameda County and Contra Costa County. It can be seen in the Robert Sibley Volcanic Regional Preserve and Caldecott Tunnel area of the Berkeley Hills. It is named for an exposed occurrence in the Moraga Valley.

It overlies the Orinda Formation, and underlies the Siesta Formation.

It preserves freshwater fossils dating back to the Pliocene epoch of the Neogene period.

== See also ==
- Mulholland Formation — occurs to the south, in the Berkeley and San Leandro Hills.
- Pliocene California geology
- List of fossiliferous stratigraphic units in California
- Paleontology in California
