= Claremont Shale =

Geologic formation in California, United States

- Stratigraphic range: Miocene epoch , Neogene Period
- Type: Geologic formation
- Unit of: Monterey Formation Group
- Underlies: Oursan Sandstone
- Overlies: Sobrante Sandstone

Location
- Region: Berkeley Hills; Alameda County California
- Country: United States

Type section
- Named for: Claremont Canyon

The Claremont Shale is a Miocene epoch geologic formation in the Berkeley Hills of the East Bay region of the San Francisco Bay Area, California.

It is found within the Claremont Canyon area of the Berkeley Hills in Alameda County and Contra Costa County.

The Claremont Shale formation preserves fossils dating back to the Miocene epoch of the Neogene period.

== Paleobiota ==
=== Mammals ===
==== Cetaceans ====
Genus	Species	Location	Notes
Kampholophos	Kampholophos serrulus	Alameda Creek	A dolphin.

=== Fish ===
==== Cartilaginous Fish ====
Genus	Species	Location	Notes
Galeocerdo	Galeocerdo aduncus	Alameda Creek	A tiger shark.

==== Bony Fish ====
Genus	Species	Location	Notes
Ganolytes	Ganolytes aratus	Berkeley, Oakland	A herring.
Lampanyctus	Lampanyctus remifer	Oakland	A lanternfish.

=== Molluscs ===
==== Scaphopods ====
Genus	Species	Location	Notes
Dentalium	-	Caldecott Tunnel	A tusk-shell.

==== Bivalves ====
Genus	Species	Location	Notes
Lucinoma	-	Caldecott Tunnel	A lucine.
Yoldia	Yoldia submontereyensis	Caldecott Tunnel	A clam.

=== Plants ===
==== Flowering Plants ====
Genus	Species	Location	Notes
Ocotea	Ocotea coloradensis	Oakland	A laurel.

=== Algae ===
==== Brown Algae(Kelps) ====
Genus	Species	Location	Notes
Paleocystophora	Paleocystophora subopposita	Oakland, Berkeley, Caldecott Tunnel	A kelp.
Paleohalidrys	Paleohalidrys occidentalis	Oakland, Berkeley	A kelp.

==== Red and Green Algae ====
Genus	Species	Location	Notes
Caulerpites	Caulerpites denticulata	Oakland, Berkeley	A relative of Caulerpa.
Ulva	Ulva latuca	Oakland	A sea lettuce.

== See also ==
- Claremont Canyon Regional Preserve
- Claremont, Oakland/Berkeley, California
- List of fossiliferous stratigraphic units in California
- Paleontology in California
