= Round Top (Contra Costa County, California) =

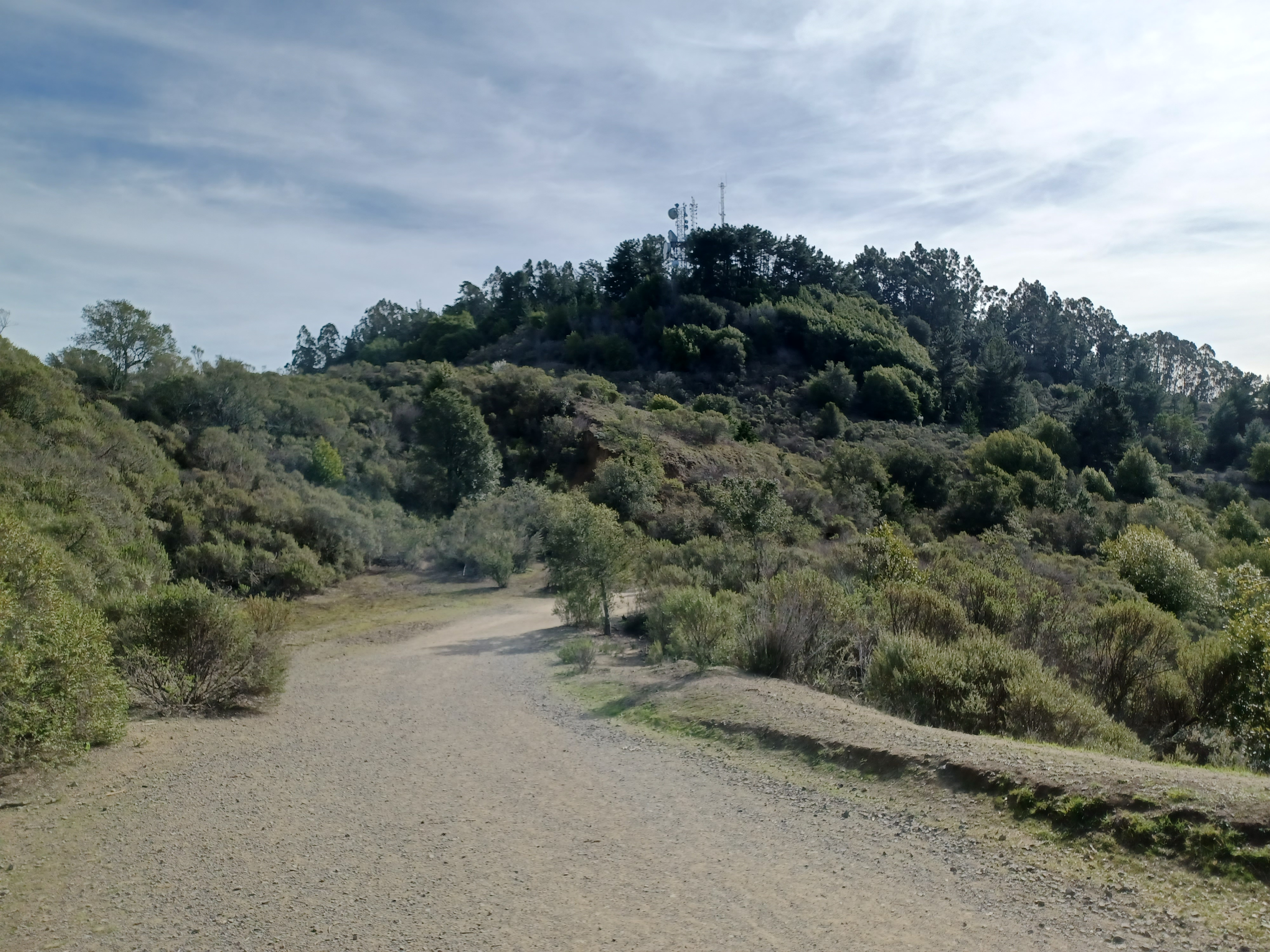

Highest point
- Elevation: 1,764 ft (538 m) NAVD 88
- Coordinates: 37°51′00″N 122°11′34″W

Geography
- Location within California Location within the United States
- Location: Contra Costa County, California, U.S.
- Parent range: Diablo Range
- Topo map: USGS Oakland East

Round Top is an extinct volcano located in the Berkeley Hills, just east of Oakland, California, within Contra Costa County. The peak is part of the Sibley Volcanic Regional Preserve, which was originally established in 1936 as Round Top Regional Park. This park was one of the first three parks in the East Bay Regional Parks District. The park was renamed Sibley Volcanic Regional Preserve in 1958 in honor of Robert Sibley, the second president of the park district, shortly after his death in 1958.

The volcanic activity that created Round Top began approximately 10.2 million years ago and continued for over one million years. The area has two known main volcanic vents: one under the Lawrence Berkeley National Laboratory and the other at Round Top itself. Over time, the Round Top vent has tilted and fallen sideways, a testament to the geological changes that have shaped the region over millions of years.

== See also ==
- Robert Sibley Volcanic Regional Preserve
- List of summits of the San Francisco Bay Area
