= Claremont Canyon Conservancy =

Environmental organization in California

The Claremont Canyon Conservancy, a California nonprofit corporation, provides stewardship, advocacy, and educational programs for its members and the public regarding Claremont Canyon, a 500-acre (2.0 km^{2}) wildland canyon in the East Bay Hills. The conservancy owns no land but works cooperatively with the canyon’s multiple landowners, including the East Bay Regional Park District, the University of California, Berkeley, the East Bay Municipal Utility District, the City of Berkeley, and the City of Oakland.

The Claremont Canyon Conservancy (Conservancy) grew out of a citizen-based task force formed following the devastating 1991 Oakland Berkeley Firestorm, which burned through parts of Claremont Canyon destroying homes and wildlands. Expanding quickly to 500 member-households after its founding in 2001, the Conservancy continues to retain a high level of community support.

In the early 2000s, the Conservancy, in cooperation with the University of California (UC) led a reforestation program to plant thousands of coastal redwoods in a 70-acre area where UC had removed old stands of eucalyptus (E. globulus) for wildfire hazard mitigation on its land. "Redwood trees are a powerful, emotional symbol of coastal California," said the late Joe Engbeck, former vice president of the Claremont Canyon Conservancy and the person who organized the original effort. "We can't bring the redwoods back everywhere in this urban area, but we can transform (part of) this canyon."

The Conservancy continues to support substantial eucalyptus removal in Claremont Canyon by the major landowners. In 2017, UC was awarded a $3.6 million CalFire grant for large tree removal on its Hill Campus, which includes parts of Claremont Canyon. The Conservancy endorsed UC’s plan but filed a brief in 2021 requesting more specific language that would ensure wildfire mitigation through removal of large stands of eucalyptus. The Conservancy’s brief was filed in opposition to another group who had filed to minimize large tree removal, claiming concerns about visual impacts and use of herbicides.

In working with the landowners and other entities in the East Bay Hills, the Conservancy spearheaded a movement in 2021 to create a region-wide approach to wildfire safety. Calling itself the East Bay Hills Wildfire Prevention and Vegetation Management Coordination Group, this grassroots movement promotes coordination among stakeholders throughout the East Bay Hills to develop a unified approach to reducing wildfire threat.

In addition to wildfire advocacy, the Conservancy provides hands-on volunteer work sessions to remove invasive plant species, such as French broom, and to build and maintain a modest system of trails. Future work anticipated includes the monitoring of sudden oak death and the planting of native live oak seedlings, where needed. From time to time the Conservancy sponsors free nature walks on a variety of subjects. The Conservancy’s annual open public meetings held each November provide a forum for both experts and public officials alike to discuss ways to support a healthy ecosystem and promote wildfire safety.
