= Siesta Formation =

Geologic formation in California, United States

- Stratigraphic range: Neogene
- Type: Formation
- Unit of: Contra Costa Group
- Underlies: Bald Peak Formation
- Overlies: Moraga Formation

Location
- Region: California
- Country: United States

The Siesta Formation is a geologic formation in California. It preserves fossils dating back to the Neogene period.

This formation overlies the Moraga Formation and underlies the Bald Peak Formation in the Berkeley Hills. It consists of lacustrine, claystone, siltstone, sandstone, tuff, and limestone deposited in a lake environment. The formation is exposed in the syncline-formed Siesta Valley near Orinda where Route 24 crosses.

== See also ==
- List of fossiliferous stratigraphic units in California
- Paleontology in California
