= East Bay Hills =

Mountain range in the California Coastal Ranges

- Location within California

Highest point
- Peak: Sunol Peak
- Elevation: 2,182 ft (665 m)

Dimensions
- Length: 36.8 mi (59.2 km) northwest-southeast from Carquinez Strait to Alameda Creek/Highway 84
- Width: 7 mi (11 km) west-east

Geography
- Country: United States
- State: California
- Region: Central California
- Range coordinates: 37°48′06″N 122°09′12″W

The East Bay Hills are a mountain range in the California Coast Ranges subdivision of the Pacific Coast Ranges in northern California, United States. They are the first range of mountains east of San Francisco Bay and stretch from the Carquinez Strait and San Pablo Bay in the north to Alameda Creek/Highway 84 in the south, crossing both Contra Costa and Alameda Counties. Although not formally recognized by United States Geological Survey (USGS) Geographic Names Information System, the East Bay Hills is included as part of the Diablo Range in the USGS list of multiple GPS coordinates for the Diablo Range.

== Geography and geology ==
The East Bay Hills runs northwest to southeast for approximately 36.8 miles (59.2 km) with its midpoint at 37° 48' 06" N, 122° 09' 12" W. The tallest peak in the range is Sunol Peak whose summit elevation is 2,182 feet (665 m).

The East Bay Hills consists of multiple named components, from north to south: Franklin Ridge, then the Briones Hills, the Berkeley Hills, the San Leandro Hills centrally, and Walpert Ridge and Pleasanton Ridge to the southwest and southeast, respectively, culminating near Alameda Creek/Highway 84 and Niles Canyon. Further south is a sub-range of the Diablo Range including Mission Peak, Mount Allison, Mount Day and Mount Hamilton that is informally known as the Mount Hamilton Range.

Ecologically, the East Bay Hills are part of the East Bay Hills/Western Diablo Range subregion, which along with the Diablo Range, falls within the Central California Foothills and Coastal Mountains Level III Ecoregion #6.

Geologically, the East Bay Hills are bounded by the Calaveras Fault to the east and the Hayward Fault to the west. The Hayward Fault merges into the Calaveras Fault in east San Jose in Santa Clara County, about 15 kilometres (9.3 mi) south of Fremont and the southern boundary of the East Bay Hills.

The East Bay Hills are a major center of earthquakes and landslides due to the nearby major and minor fault zones. Both the East Bay Hills and Mt. Diablo continue to rise 1.5 millimetres (0.059 in) a year, which extrapolates to 1.5 metres (4.9 ft) over 1,000 years assuming constant rate and negligible erosion.

== Ecology ==
Extensive public lands are conserved in the East Bay Hills by the East Bay Municipal Utilities District (EBMUD) and the East Bay Regional Park District. The East Bay Hills have groves of coast redwoods (Sequoia sempervirens), making Alameda and Contra Costa Counties two of only four inland California counties to host these trees. The largest coast redwood tree in the East Bay Hills was reported in 1893 by William P. Gibbons (1812-1897), the American naturalist, physician and founding member of the California Academy of Sciences, who measured the hollow shell of a coast redwood in the Oakland Hills with diameter of 9.9 metres (32 ft) at chest height.

== Wildfires ==
The East Bay Hills is prone to severe wildfires as a result of Diablo winds and a Mediterranean climate with almost no summer rainfall. The Oakland firestorm of 1991 ranked as the state's largest home loss from wildfire. Major increases in fire fuel load from flammable vegetation over the last century continue to increase the wildfire risk as grazed grasslands have yielded to brush and unmaintained pine or eucalyptus. The East Bay Regional Park District is implementing vegetation treatments to reduce fire fuel loads on up to 2,280 acres (9.2 km^{2}) in Contra Costa and Alameda Counties in the East Bay Hills.
