= Lake Chabot Regional Park =

Regional park in Alameda County, California

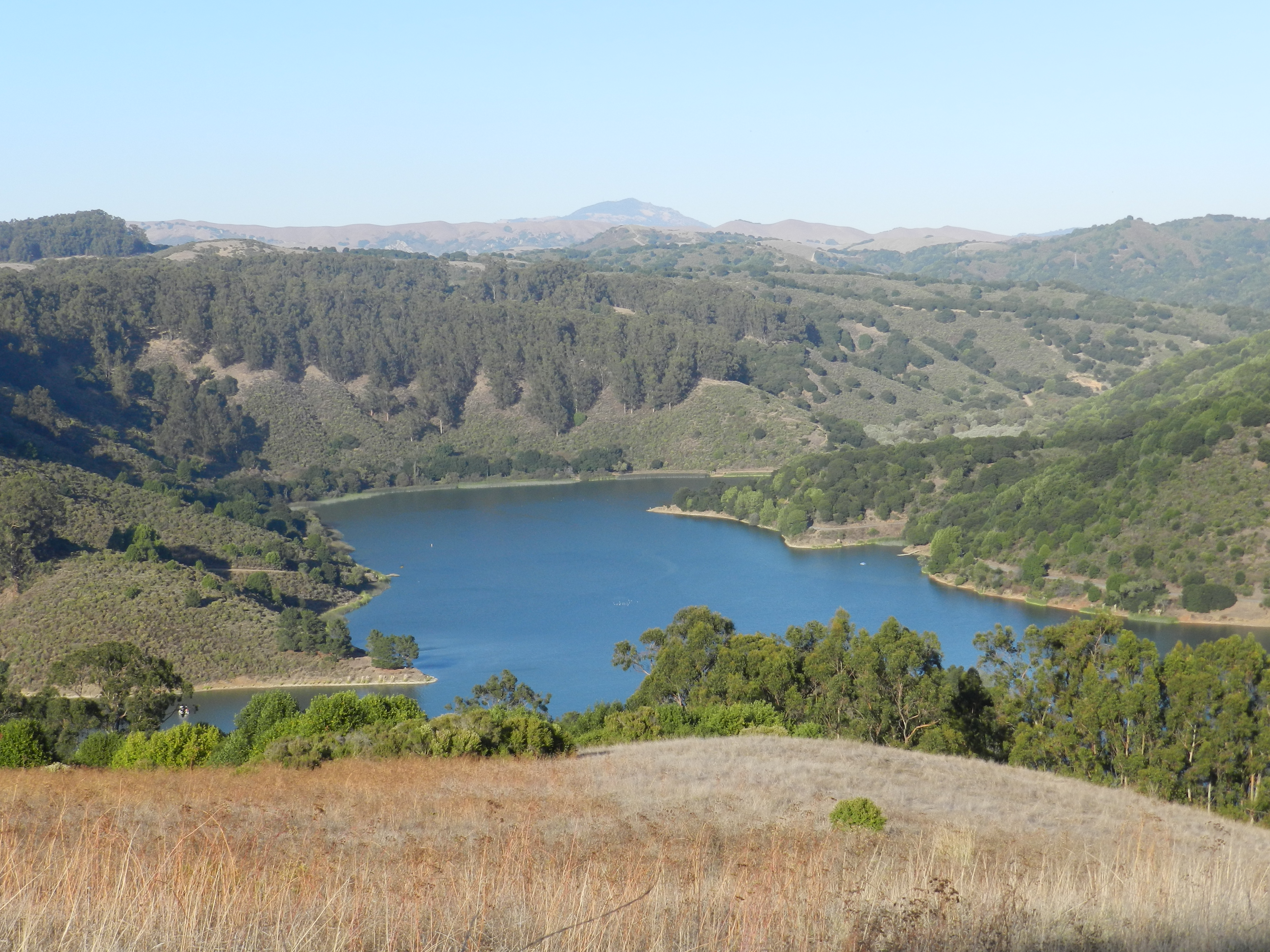
- Lake Chabot, from the Fairmont Staging Area, Lake Chabot Regional Park

- Location within San Francisco Bay Area Location within California Location within the United States
- Location: Alameda County, California
- Coordinates: 37.739769°N 122.101364°W
- Operator: East Bay Regional Park District

Lake Chabot Regional Park is a regional park located in the southern Berkeley Hills in Alameda County, California. It was opened to the public on June 18, 1966, as part of the East Bay Regional Parks system.

Lake Chabot is a reservoir located in the park. The northern part of the lake and park lie within the boundary of the city of Oakland, while the southern part lies in an unincorporated area of Alameda County adjacent to Castro Valley and San Leandro.

The dam and reservoir's water are part of the East Bay Municipal Utility District (EBMUD) water system. The 315-acre lake currently serves as emergency water supply to the East Bay, and swimming is never allowed. However, fishing and boating are popular activities at Lake Chabot throughout the year.

== Gallery ==
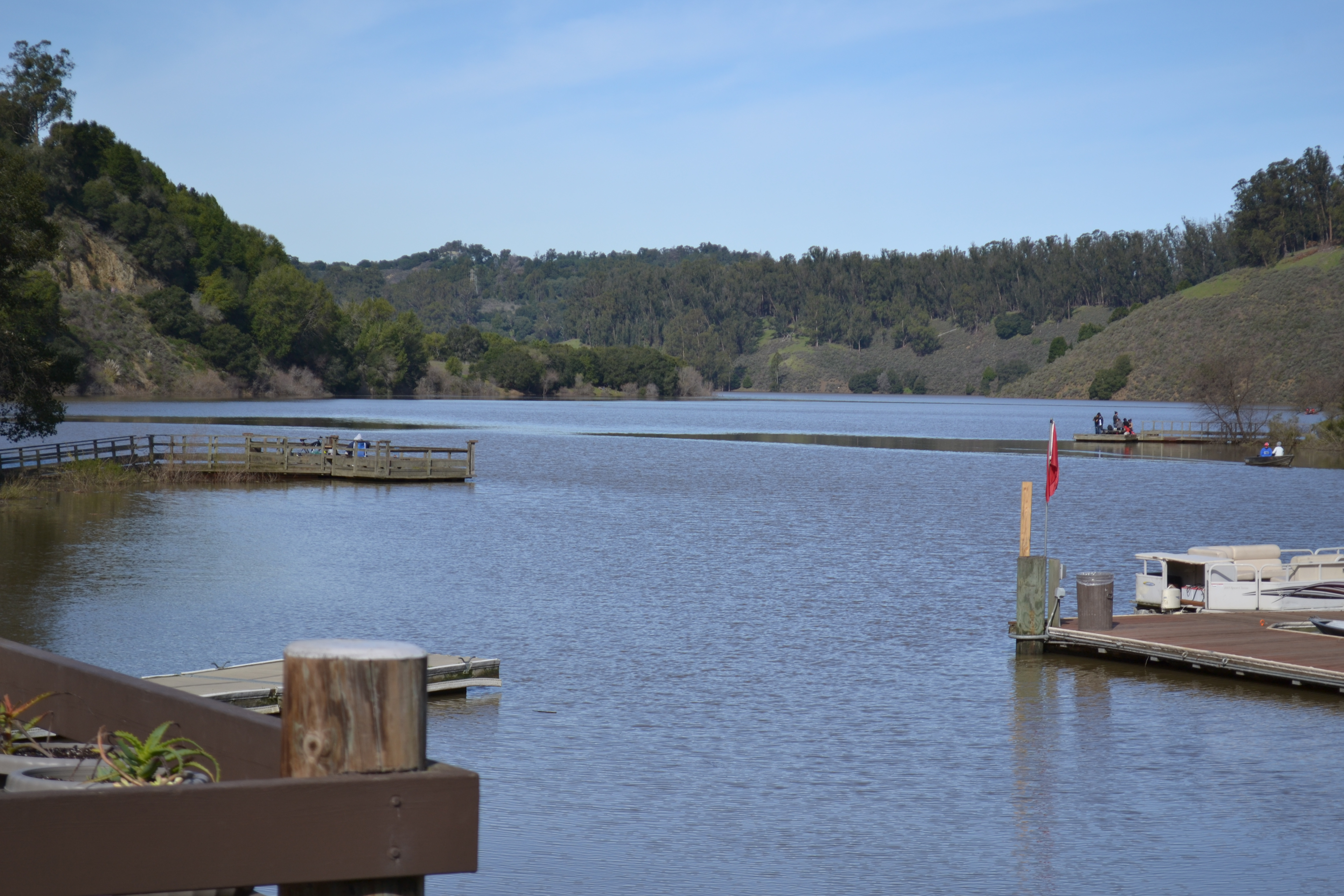

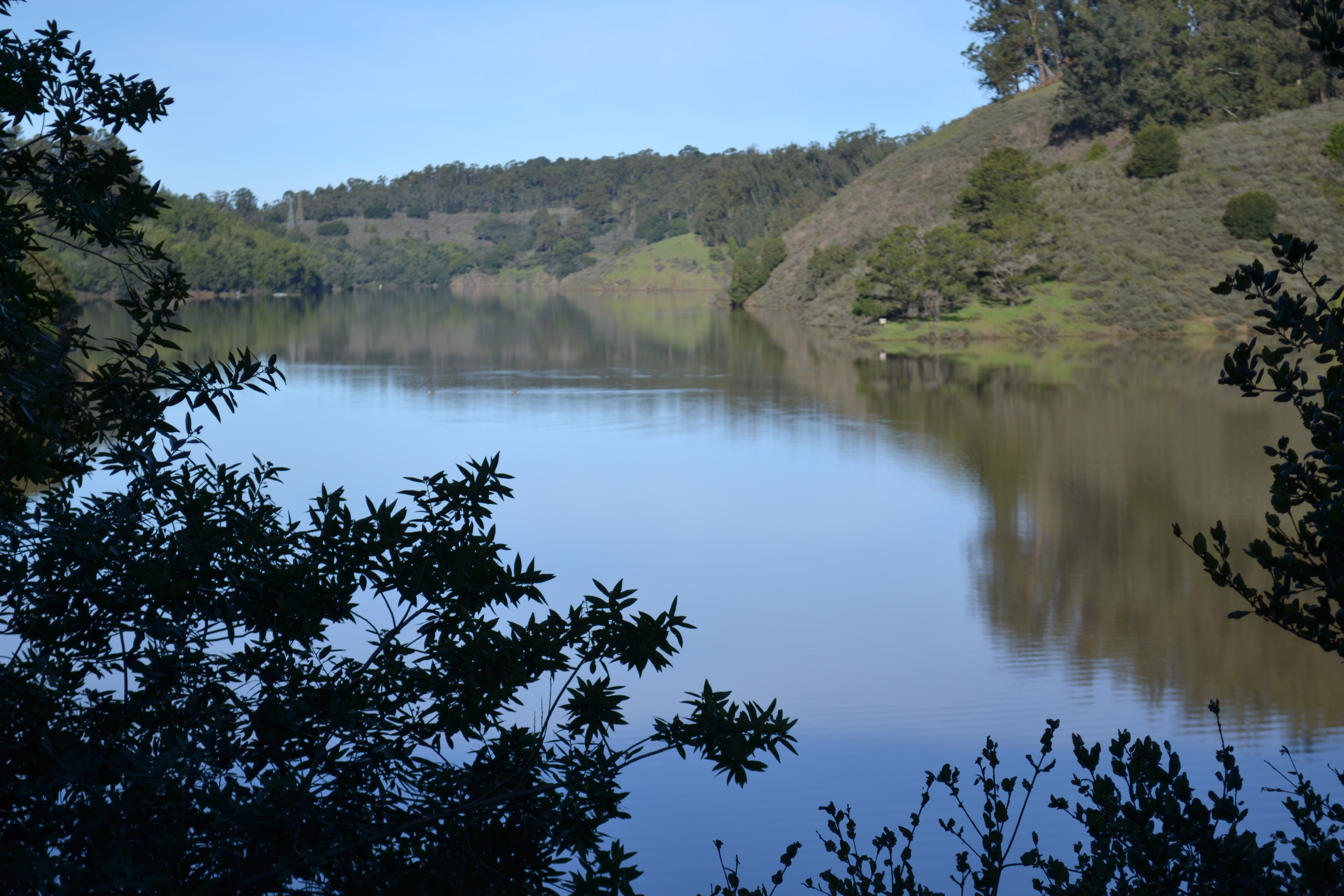

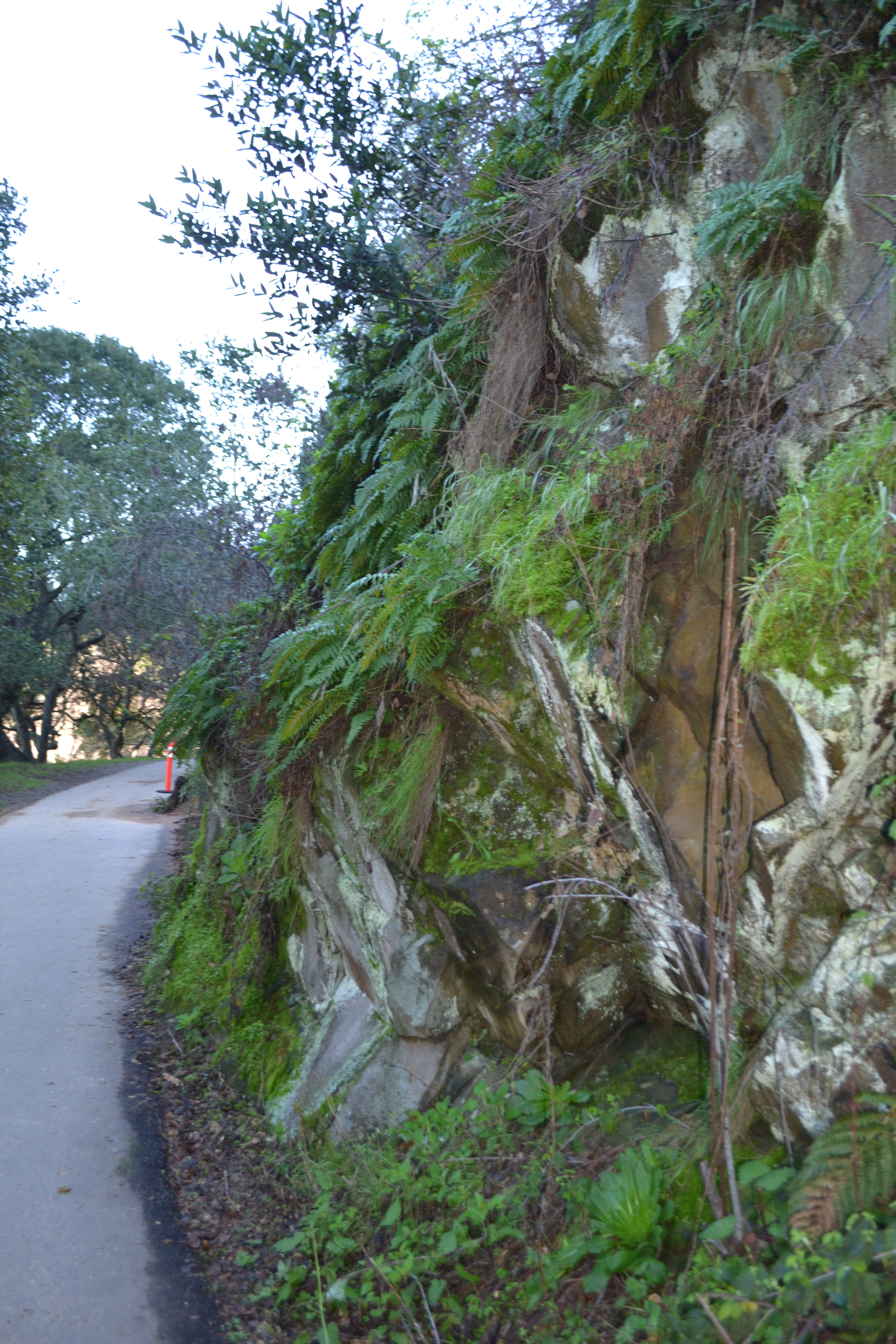

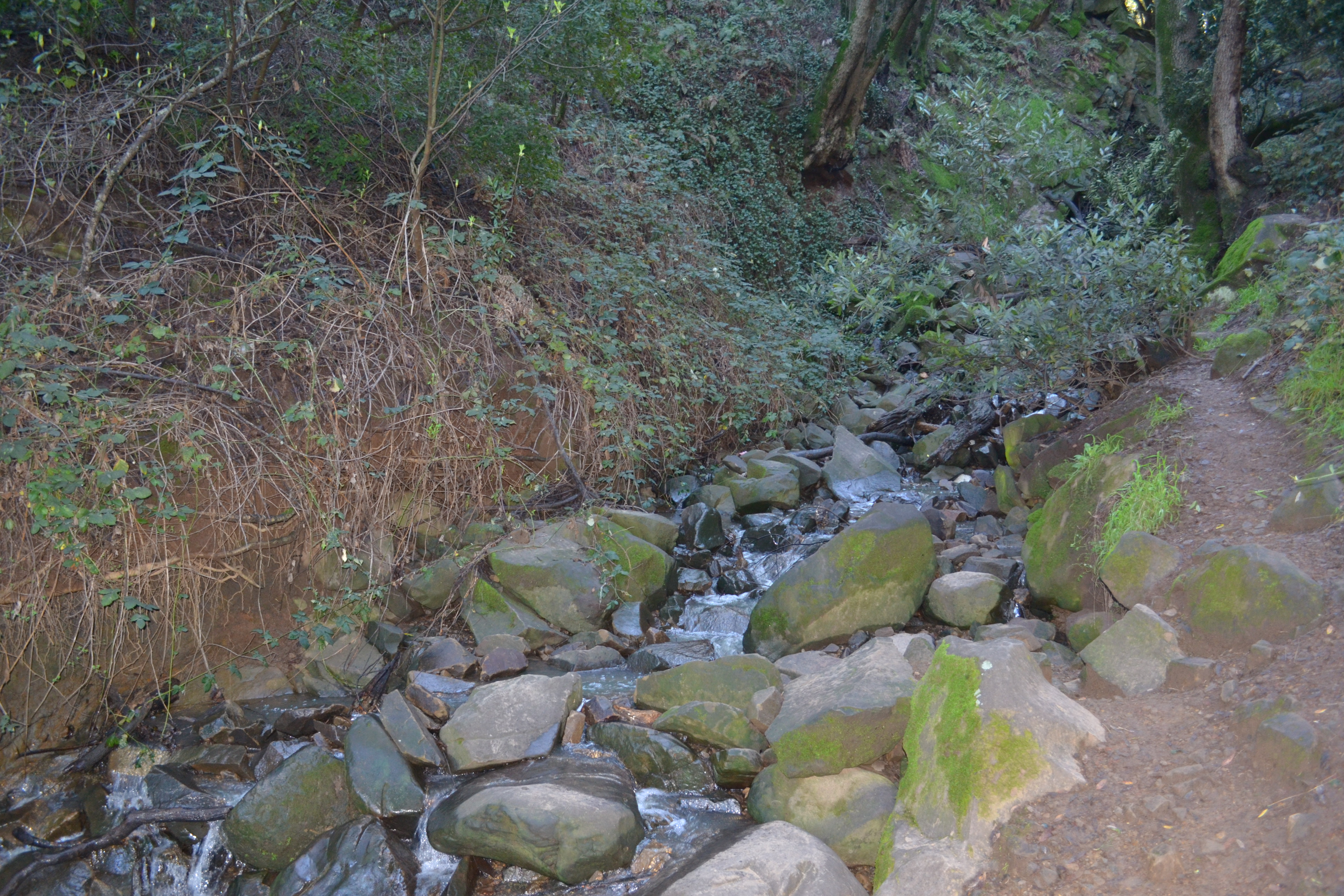

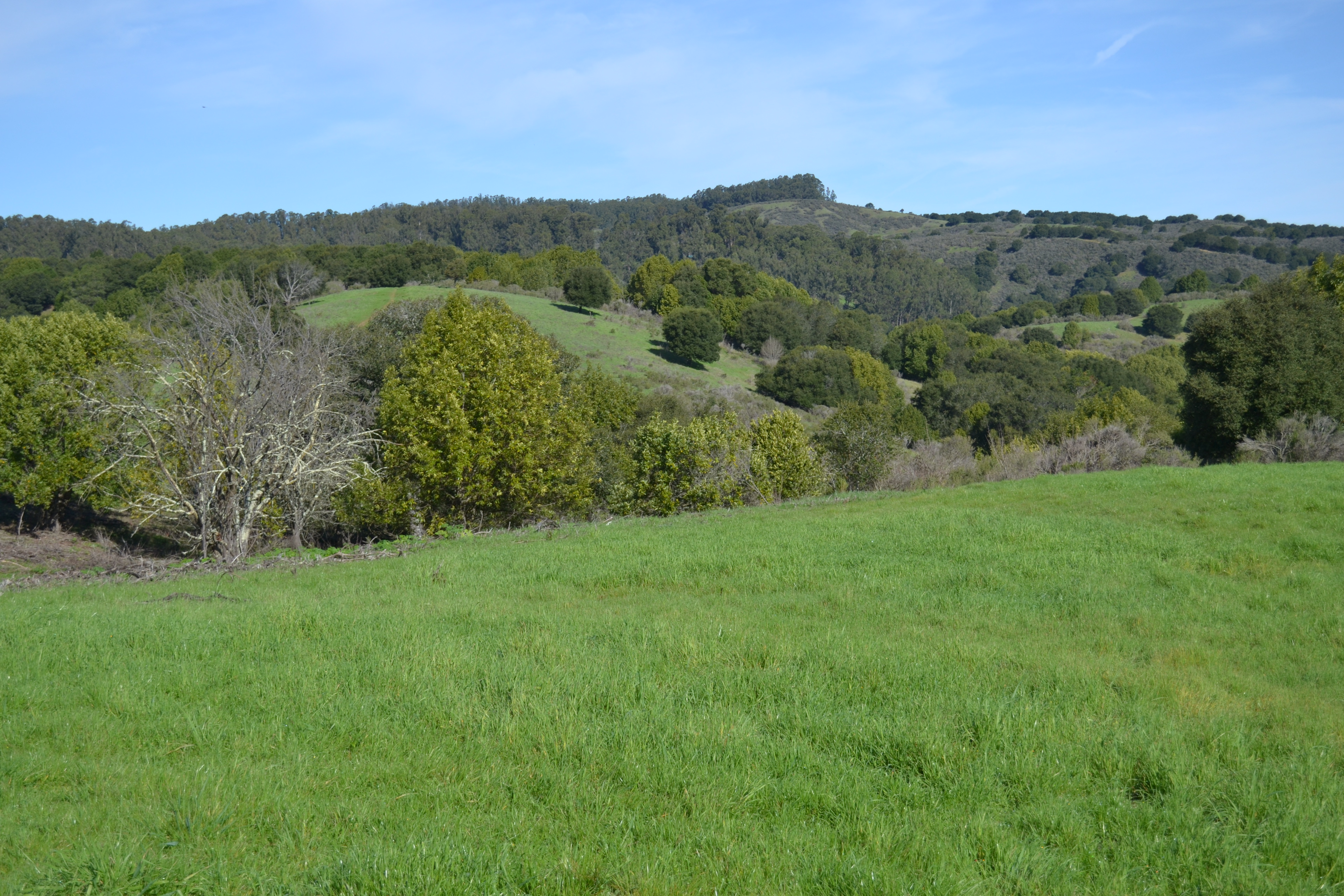

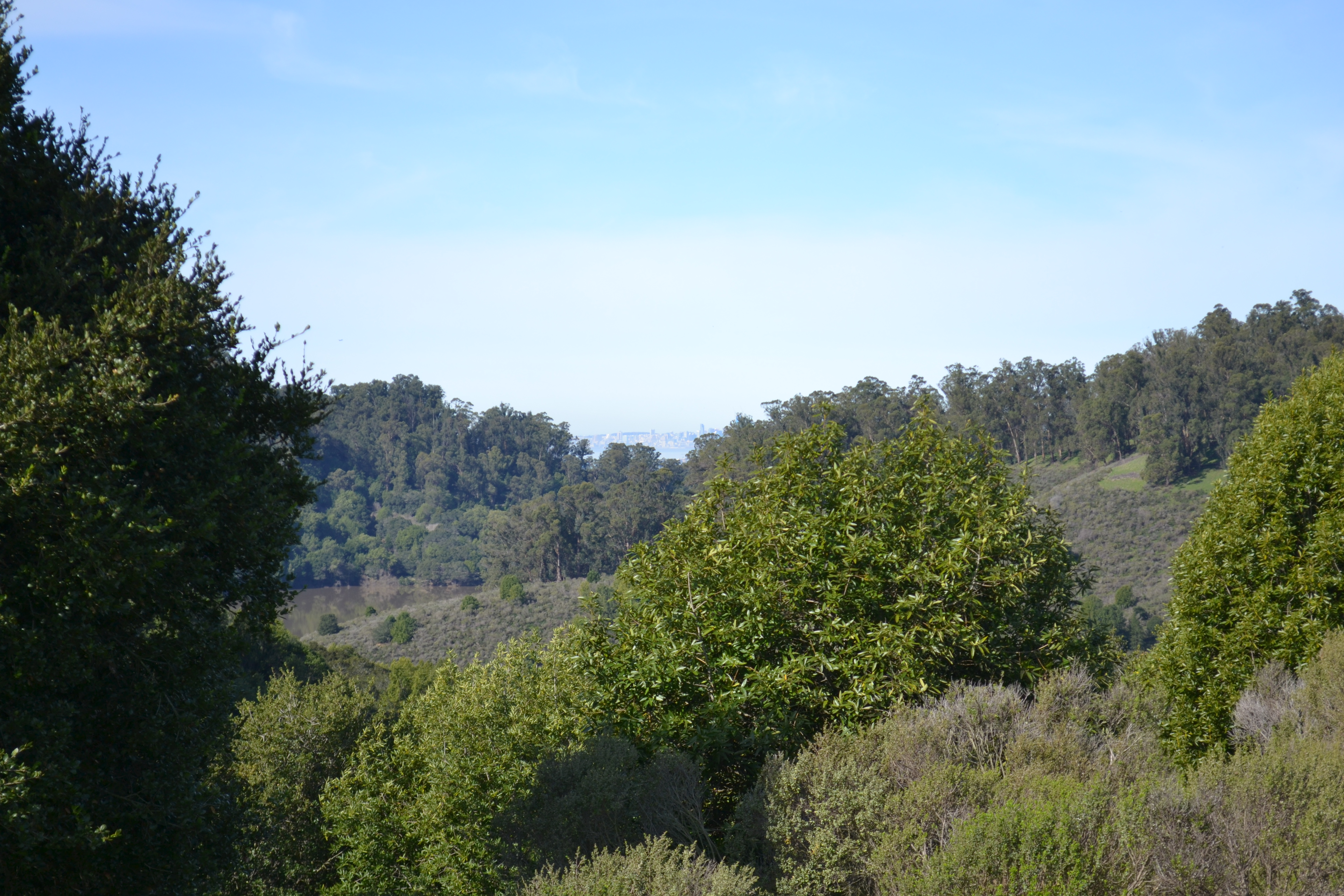

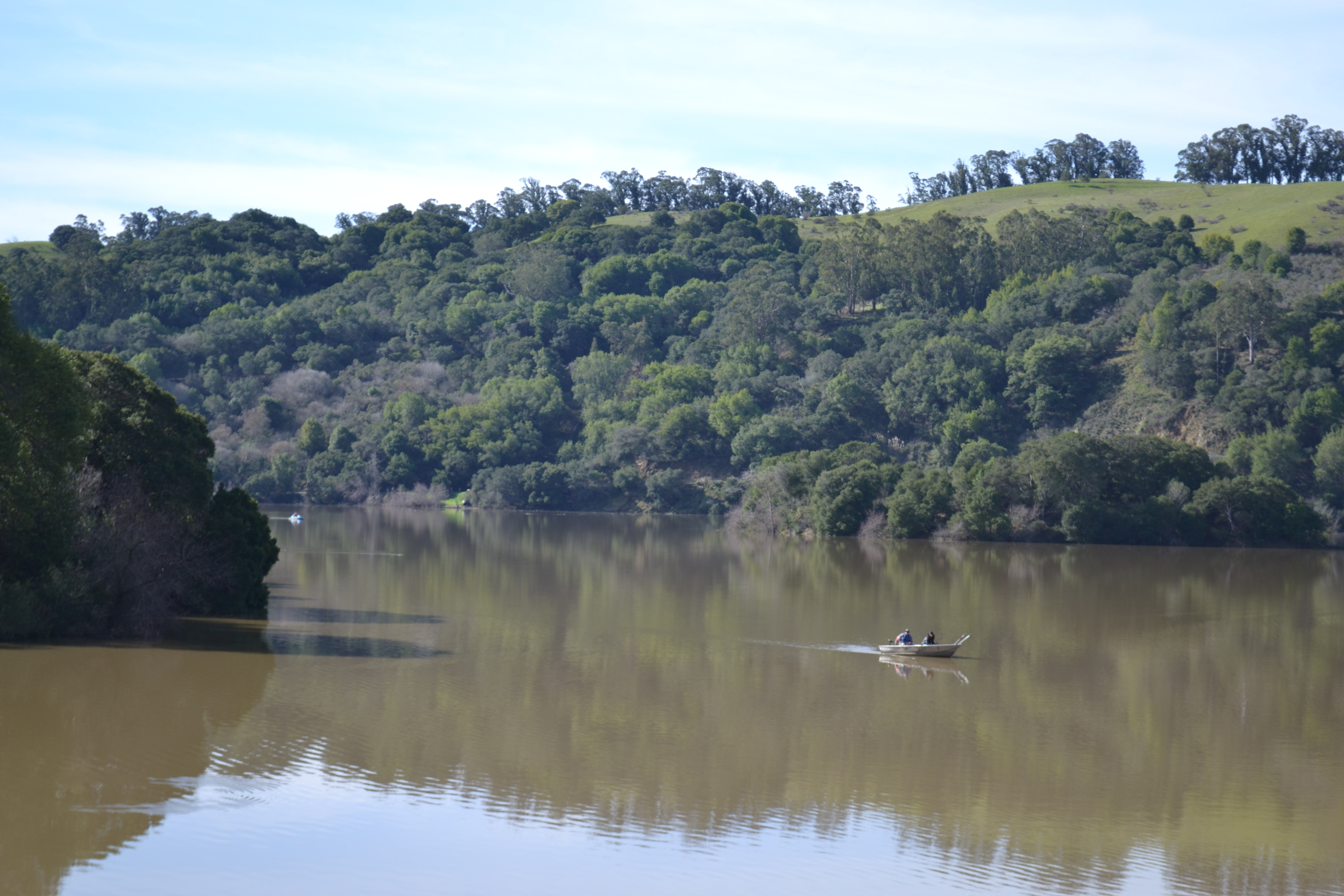

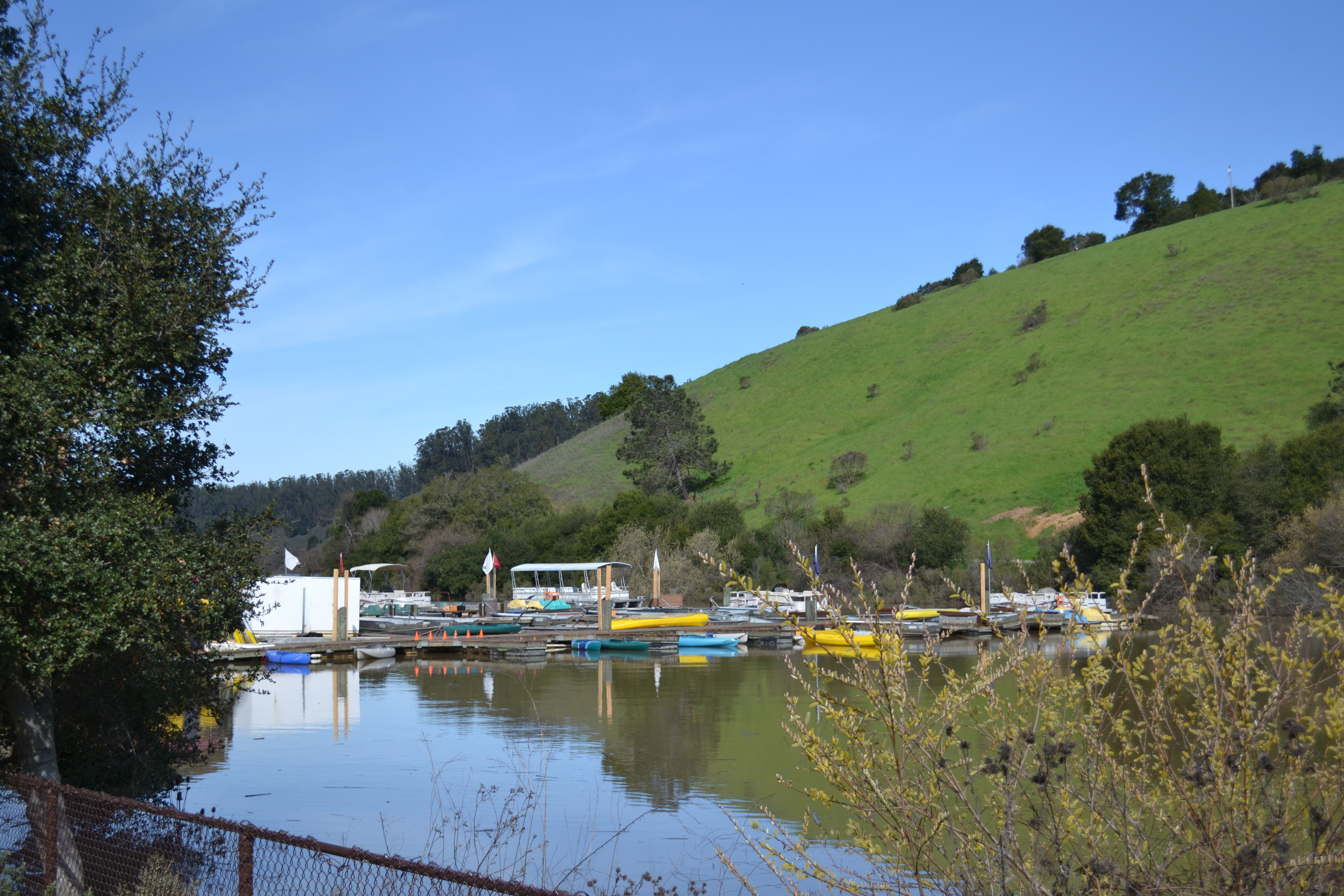

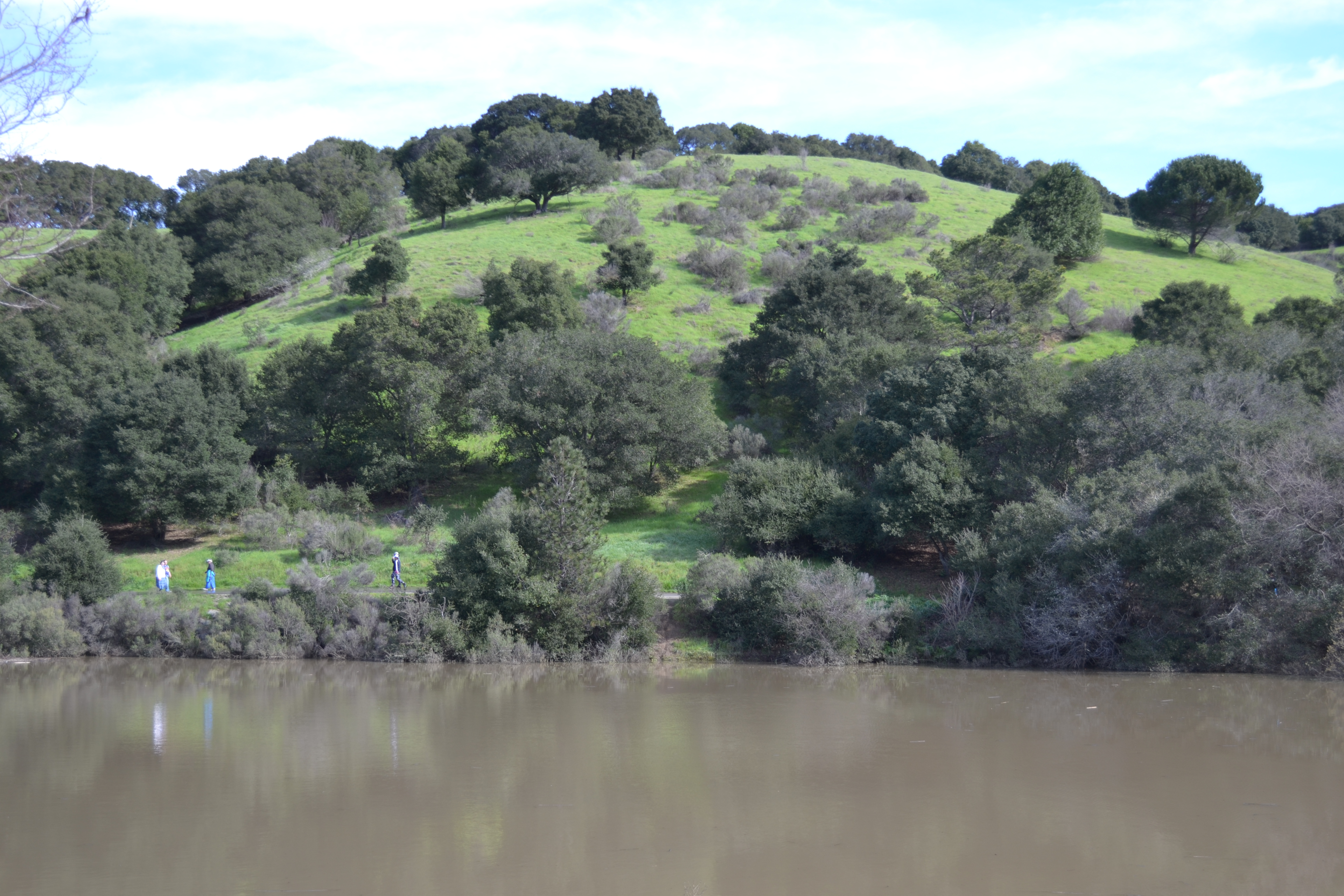

== See also ==
- Lake Chabot
