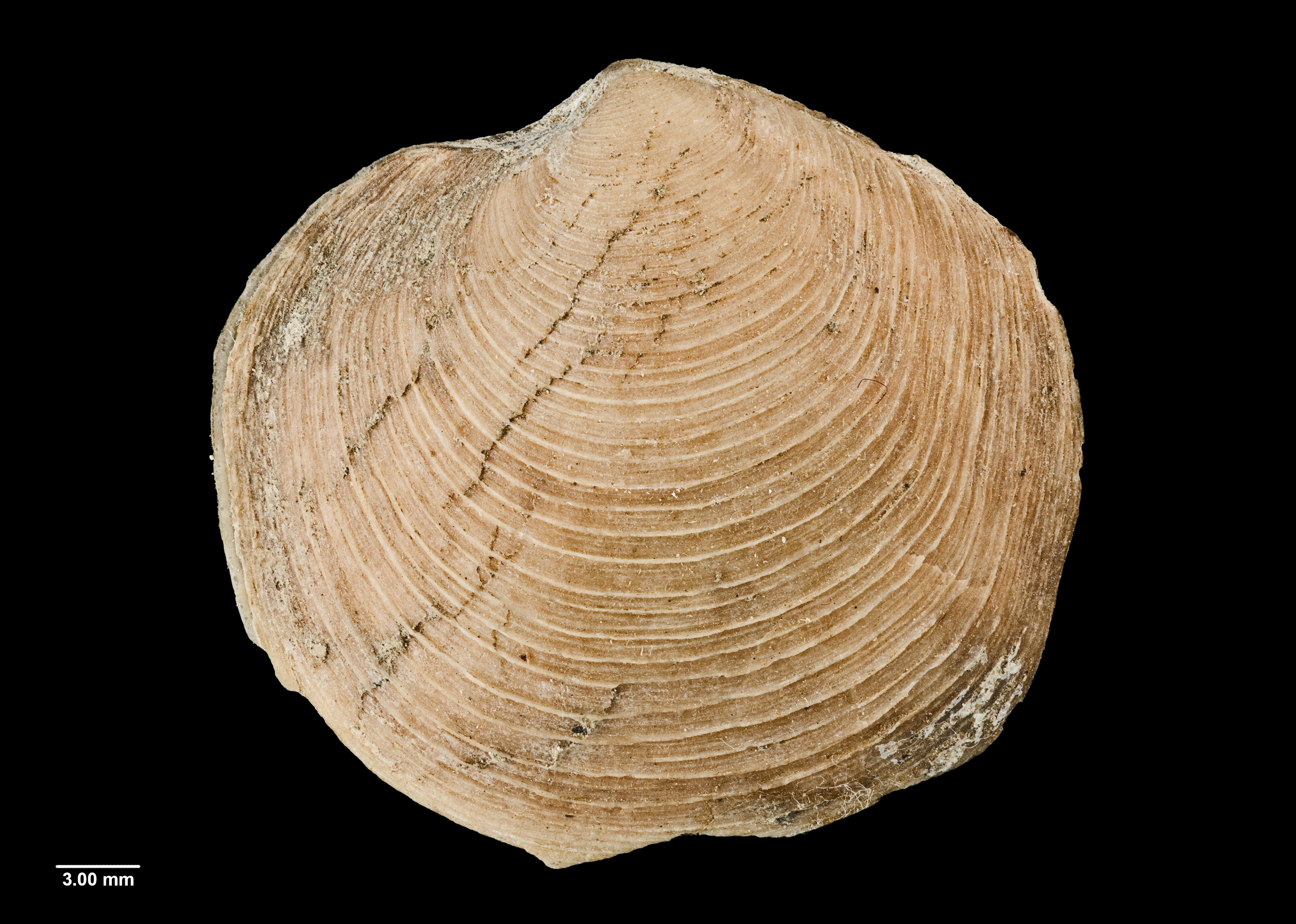
- Holotype from Auckland War Memorial Museum

Scientific classification
- Kingdom: Animalia
- Phylum: Mollusca
- Class: Bivalvia
- Order: Lucinida
- Family: Lucinidae
- Genus: Lucinoma
- Species: †L. taylori

Binomial name
- †Lucinoma taylori (A. W. B. Powell, 1935)

Synonyms
- Myrtea (Lucinoma) taylori A. W. B. Powell, 1935

= Lucinoma taylori =

Lucinoma taylori Temporal range: early Miocene

Extinct species of gastropod

Lucinoma taylori is an extinct species of bivalve, a marine mollusc, in the family Lucinidae. Fossils of the species date to early Miocene strata of the west coast of the Auckland Region, New Zealand.

== Description ==
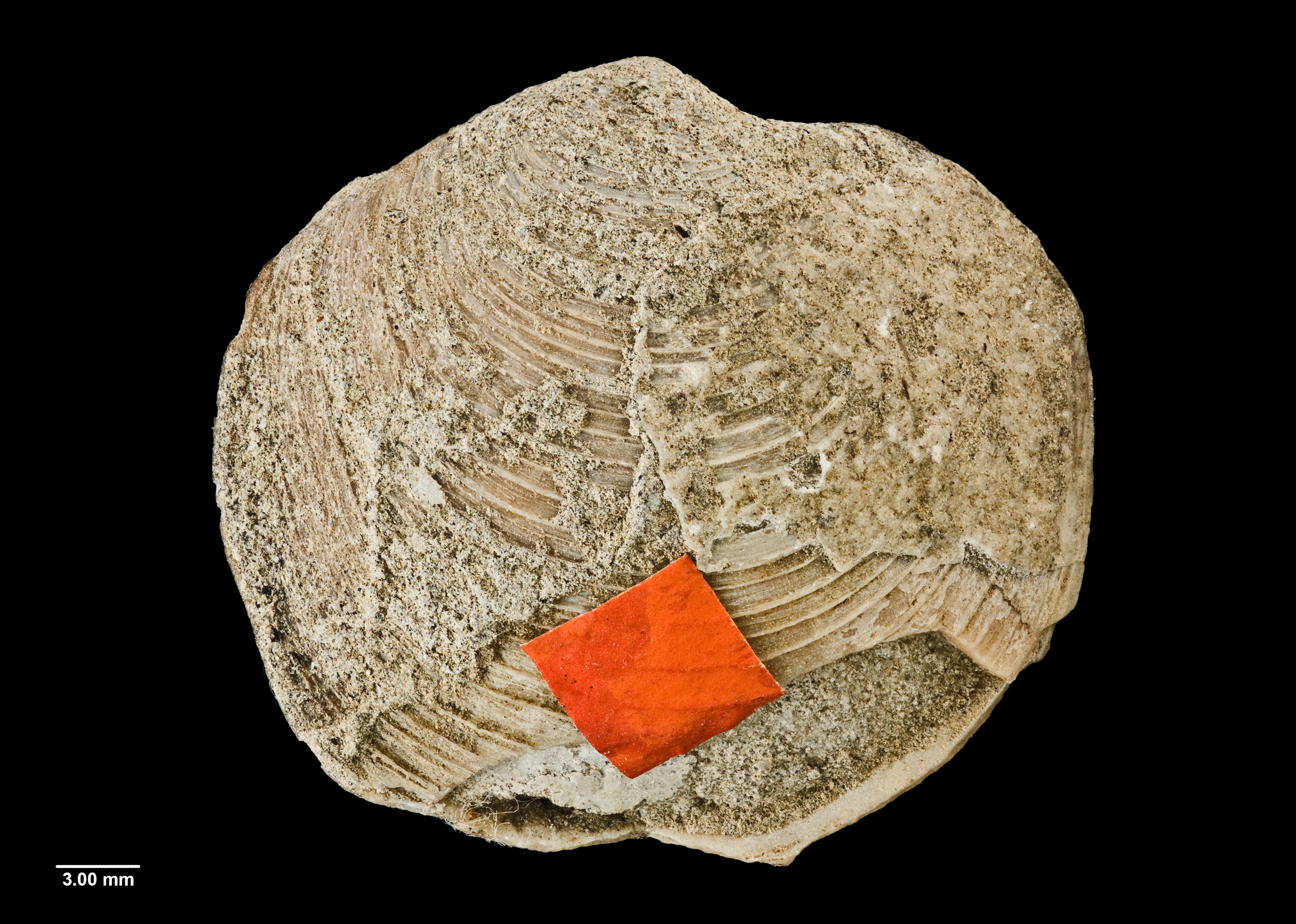
Underside view of holotype

In the original description, Powell described the species as follows:

Shell of moderate size, suborbicular, sculptured with regularly disposed fine, sharp, concentric riblets, the interspaces each having four or five considerably finer and somewhat irregular concentric growth lines. The concentric riblets are a little less than one millimetre apart over the lower part of the shell. There is no radial sculpture, and the typical lucinoid anterior and posterior radial sulci are only just visible, mainly owing to a very slight reduction in strength of the concentric sculpture above the posterior sulcus in particular. There is a moderate-sized lanceolate pseudo-lunule, situated immediately in front of the beaks and a longer lanceolate ligamental groove posterior to the beaks. Interior of shell not accessible in any of the specimens.

The holotype of the species measures 30 mm (1.2 in) in height, 32.5 mm (1.28 in) in length and a thickness of 15 mm (0.59 in) when measuring both valves. The species can be distinguished from L. borealis due to L. taylori having fewer concentric riblets and more widely spaces, and that the anterior and posterior radial sulci of L. borealis are almost completely obsolete. It can be distinguished from L. saetheri due to having a smaller size and having a shorter antero-dorsal margin.

== Taxonomy ==
The species was first described by A. W. B. Powell in 1935 as Myrtea (Lucinoma) taylori. The current accepted scientific name is Lucinoma taylori. The holotype was collected at an unknown date prior to 1935 from fallen rocks at the southern end of Maukatia Bay, south of Muriwai, Auckland Region (then more commonly known as Motutara), and is held in the collections of Auckland War Memorial Museum.

== Ecology ==
The species was a deposit feeding bivalve, that was likely preyed upon by the starfish species Pseudarchaster motutaraensis.

== Distribution ==
This extinct marine species occurs in early Miocene strata of the Nihotupu Formation of New Zealand, on the west coast of the Waitākere Ranges of the Auckland Region, New Zealand. The deposits of the Nihotupu Formation in the western Waitākere Ranges where fossils of the species have been found are mid-bathyal 800–2,000 m (2,600–6,600 ft).
