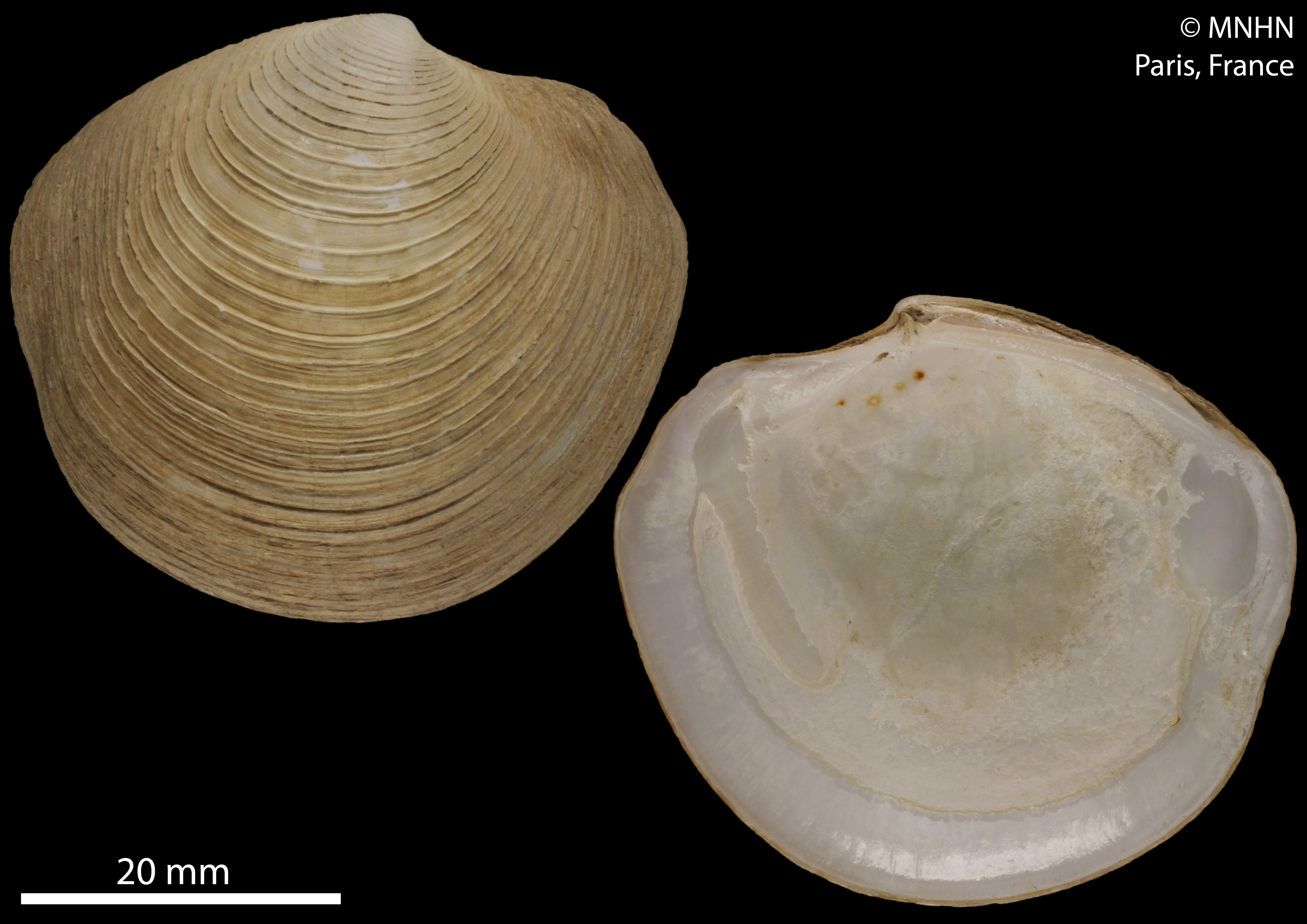
- Shell of Lucinoma dulcinea (specimen at MNHN, Paris)

Scientific classification
- Domain: Eukaryota
- Kingdom: Animalia
- Phylum: Mollusca
- Class: Bivalvia
- Order: Lucinida
- Superfamily: Lucinoidea
- Family: Lucinidae
- Genus: Lucinoma; Dall, 1901

Type species
- Lucina filosa Stimpson, 1851

Species
- See text

Synonyms
- Myrtea (Lucinoma) Dall, 1901; Phacoides (Lucinoma) Dall, 1901 (original rank); Poumea Glover & J. D. Taylor, 2007; Triodonta Gray, 1851 (invalid: junior homonym of Triodonta Bory de Saint-Vincent, 1827)

= Lucinoma =

Genus of molluscs

Lucinoma is a genus of saltwater clams, marine bivalve molluscs in the subfamily Codakiinae of the family Lucinidae.

== Species ==
- † Lucinoma acutilineata (Conrad, 1849)
- Lucinoma aequalis (Thiele, 1931)
- Lucinoma aequizonata (Stearns, 1890)
- Lucinoma anemiophila Holmes, P. G. Oliver & Sellanes, 2005
- Lucinoma annulata (Reeve, 1850)
- † Lucinoma aokii Hirayama, 1958
- Lucinoma asapheus P. G. Oliver, Rodrigues & M. R. Cunha, 2011
- Lucinoma atalantae Cosel, 2006
- Lucinoma atlantis (McLean, 1936)
- Lucinoma bengalensis (E. A. Smith, 1894)
- † Lucinoma bermudensis (Dall, 1901)
- Lucinoma blakeana (Bush, 1893)
- Lucinoma borealis (Linnaeus, 1767)
- † Lucinoma canudai Kiel, Aguilar & Kase, 2020
- Lucinoma capensis (Jaeckel & Thiele, 1931)
- Lucinoma coselia (Glover & J. D. Taylor, 2007)
- Lucinoma dulcinea Cosel & Bouchet, 2008
- Lucinoma estasia Glover & J. D. Taylor, 2016
- Lucinoma euclia (Cotton & Godfrey, 1938)
- Lucinoma filosa (Stimpson, 1851)
- Lucinoma gabrieli (Chapman, 1941)
- Lucinoma gagei P. G. Oliver & Holmes, 2006
- Lucinoma galathea Marwick, 1953
- † Lucinoma gracilistriata Hirayama, 1954
- Lucinoma heroica (Dall, 1901)
- Lucinoma kastoroae Cosel & Bouchet, 2008
- Lucinoma kazani Salas & Woodside, 2002
- † Lucinoma kosatorea Kiel, Aguilar & Kase, 2020
- Lucinoma lamellata (E. A. Smith, 1881)
- Lucinoma myriamae Cosel, 2006
- Lucinoma percirrata (Cotton & Godfrey, 1938)
- † Lucinoma perusina (Sacco, 1901)
- Lucinoma rhomboidalis Cosel & Bouchet, 2008
- † Lucinoma saetheri Amano, Little & K. A. Campbell, 2018
- Lucinoma saldanhae (Barnard, 1964)
- † Lucinoma shinokii Hirayama, 1954
- Lucinoma sibogae Cosel & Bouchet, 2008
- Lucinoma soliditesta (Okutani & Hashimoto, 1997)
- Lucinoma spectabilis (Yokoyama, 1920)
- Lucinoma taiwanensis Cosel & Bouchet, 2008
- † Lucinoma taylori (Powell, 1935)
- Lucinoma thula J. D. Taylor & Glover, 2017
- † Lucinoma tinagoensis Kiel, Aguilar & Kase, 2020
- † Lucinoma velosoi Kiel, Aguilar & Kase, 2020
- Lucinoma vestita (Dautzenberg & H. Fischer, 1906)
- Lucinoma yoshidai Habe, 1958
- † Lucinoma zapotalensis (Olsson, 1931)
