= Robert Sibley Volcanic Regional Preserve =

Nature preserve in the San Francisco Bay Area

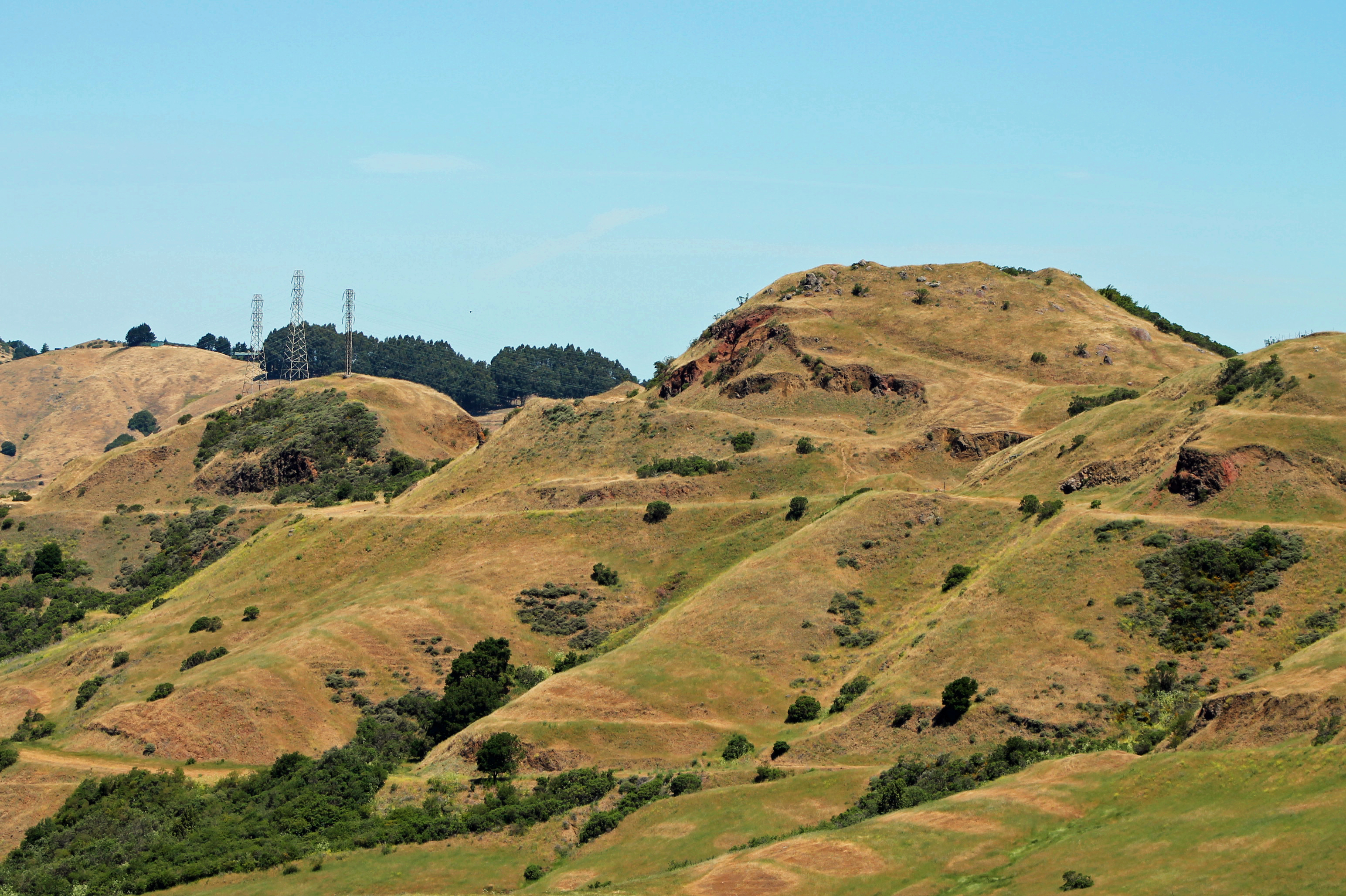
- View from Round Top at Sibley Volcanic Regional Preserve
- Interactive map of Robert Sibley Volcanic Regional Preserve
- Location: Alameda and Contra Costa Counties, California
- Nearest city: Oakland, California
- Coordinates: 37.85495°N 122.20326°W
- Area: 928 acres (3.76 km^{2})
- Created: 1936
- Operator: East Bay Regional Park District

Robert Sibley Volcanic Regional Preserve is located in the Oakland Hills of the East Bay region of the San Francisco Bay Area, California. The park is part of the East Bay Regional Parks District (EBRPD), covers about 1318 acres (5.33 km^{2}) after an expansion that added 639 acres, and lies east of Oakland, partly in Alameda County and partly in Contra Costa County. It can be entered from Oakland via Skyline Boulevard, or from Contra Costa County via Old Tunnel Road.

== History ==
The park was one of the first three parks established by the East Bay Regional Parks District (EBRPD) in 1936. (Note: The other two original parks were Tilden and Temescal.) It was originally named Round Top Regional Park. Round Top (elevation 1,761 feet [537 m]) is named for an extinct volcano in the Oakland Hills which started to erupt 10.2 million years ago. It is home to at least two stone labyrinths of recent origin. The park was renamed after the second president of the EBRPD, Robert Sibley, shortly after his death. U.C. Berkeley Professor Emeritus Garniss Curtis studied the Sibley Regional Preserve extensively, dating the volcano to be 10.2 million years old. Since 10.2 million years ago, the movement along the San Andreas fault system has slowly pushed the volcano north. Curtis proposed that the Sibley volcanic rocks where a displaced piece of the Hollister-Quien Sabe volcanic field, 80 miles south of the preserve.

== Geology ==
The preserve contains a Miocene epoch volcanic center that, about ten million years ago, produced most of the lavas that underlie the East Bay ridges from Inspiration Point in Tilden Regional Park to Moraga. Geologists refer to this local volcanism as the Moraga Volcanics. Subsequent compressive strains produced by various local faults such as the Hayward Fault folded the lava-bearing rock formations, tilting the Round Top vent complex on its side. The results of such compressive strains of local faults has altered the volcano's original landscape, and Round Top now tilts towards the east. Such local faults, notably Hayward and Moraga, have also caused the volcano to form a trough that is the Siesta/Gateway Valley.

Folding, erosion, and a quarry operation exposed a cross section of the volcano, providing an excellent means to study a California Coast Ranges volcano. The mountain Round Top is not the volcano. The ancient volcano has eroded away. It has also tilted on its side, so it doesn't look like a volcano. (https://www.kqed.org/news/11876393/wait-there-was-a-volcano-in-the-east-bay-hills) The construction corporation Kaiser Sand & Gravel used the region as a quarry, leaving the volcanic region open and exposed. Lava within the vent has been dated by UC Berkeley at 9.5 million years old. Additionally, a volcanic tuff within the Moraga Formation has been dated to roughly 10 million years ago.

=== Rock Formations ===
The region has remnants of rocks from the Orinda Formation and the Claremont Formation. From the Orinda Formation rocks include "river gravel, sandstone, and mudstone." The river gravel are red in color. The formation was deposited during the Miocene epoch, about 10 million years ago. From the Claremont Formation, rocks include marine rocks.

The surface of the basalt found on the dike of Round Top are of the color "light brownish or rusty gray" and the interior of the basalt is of the color "gun steel blue."

=== Bake Zone ===
A bake zone is a region where heat from the lava of the volcano changed the color of the surrounding rocks to red. Such rocks include rhyolite tuff, lapilli agglomerate, and vesicular basalt. Rhyolite tuff are remnants of ash from a northern volcano around 4 miles (6.4 km) away. Lapilli agglomerate are remnants of volcanic cinders. Vesicular basalt are remnants of gas bubbles from cooling lava.

=== The Stone Property ===
The Stone Property is a restricted region of the park. The area consists of pure basalt around 100 feet (30 m) wide, as well as "autobrecciating basaltic flow" which occurs when lava continues to flow under a cooled surface.

== Ecology ==
The preserve has also undergone restoration efforts to improve its creek and riparian habitats. One example is the Alder and Leatherwood Creek Restoration Project, which restored almost half a mile of stream that had previously been placed in culverts. The project also added native vegetation along Alder, Leatherwood, and San Leandro creeks and created more natural pool and riffle habitats.

Cattle graze along the preserve from November to May. The grazing helps prevent wildfires and preserves the habitat for native plants and wildlife. There is a stock pond on the north side of the preserve with cattails and blackbirds. During the spring and winter, frogs and newts can also be found in the pond. Part of the Caldecott Wildlife Corridor runs through the preserve and connects habitats throughout the Oakland and Berkeley Hills. This gives animals such as coyotes, deer, foxes, and mountain lions a way to move between different protected areas, even though much of the surrounding land has been developed.

Sibley’s grasslands provide a natural habitat for Alameda Whipsnake (Masticophis lateralis euryxanthus), a California-threatened species. The snake relies on open shrub and chaparral, but has also moved into neighboring woodlands and grassland. The Park district manages the distinct portions of the preserve to maintain an optimal mixture of scrub, grassland, and rocky habitat suitable for the snake and its prey.

== Activities ==
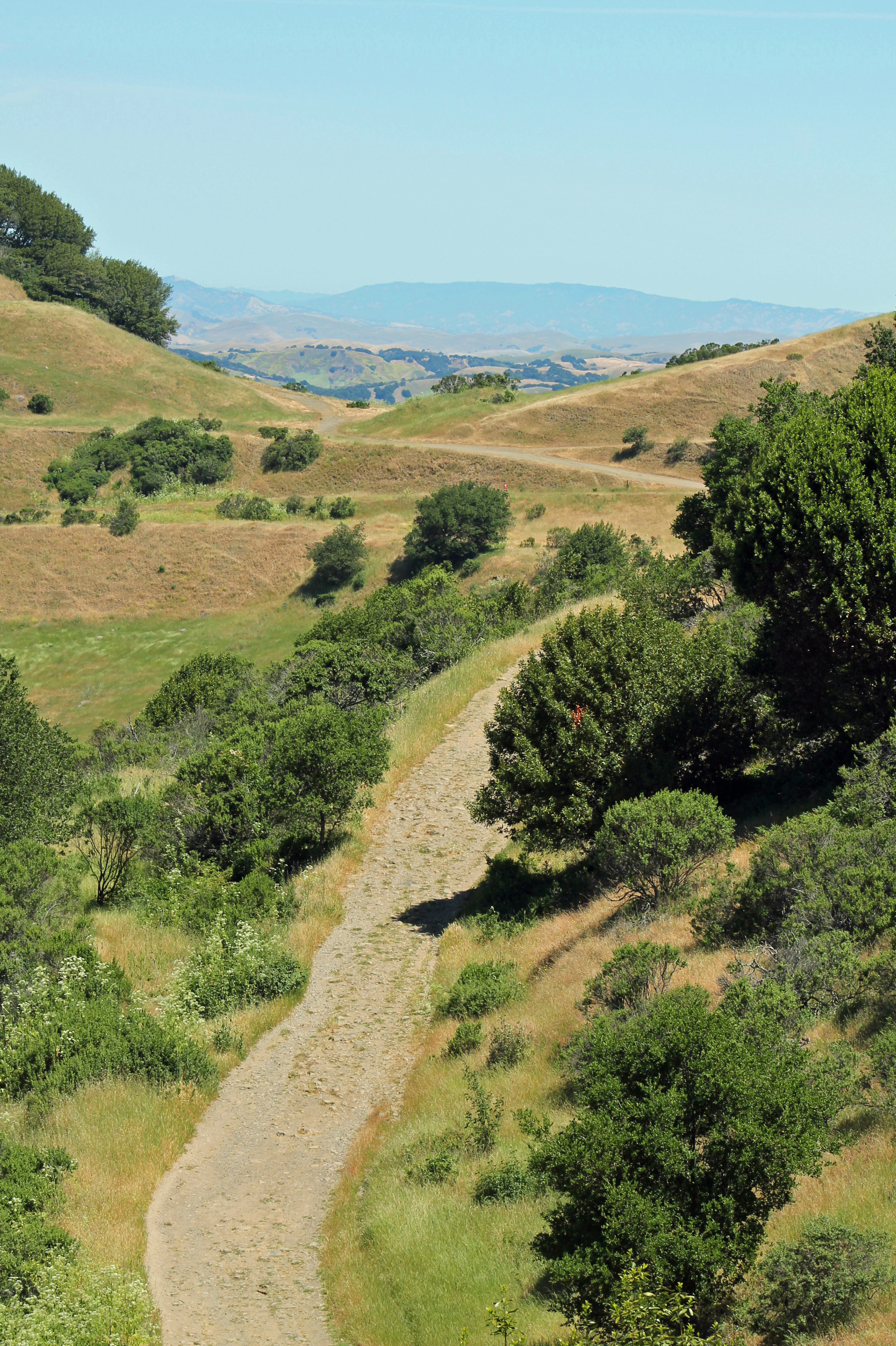
A view from Round Top

There are several trails in the preserve. Most are restricted to hiking and horseback use and only a few are available for multi-purpose use. Round Top Road is paved from the visitor center to the top of Round Top. There are no picnic areas in the preserve; however, there are plenty of benches good for a rest, view and snack, as well as a campground. The visitor center at the Skyline Boulevard entrance is unstaffed and offers brochures for self-guided tours. It also features depictions of the region's geology.

=== Hiking trails ===
- East Bay Skyline Regional Trail, which is 31 miles (50 km) long, traverses the Sibley preserve on the ridgeline that separates Wildcat Canyon Regional Park and Anthony Chabot Regional Park.
- Round Top Road goes from the Sibley visitor center to the peak of Round Top.
- Round Top Loop Trail circles Round Top's peak.
- Volcanic Trail, once a quarry haul road, contains most of the stops on the self-guided volcanic tour.
- Quarry Trail connects the middle of Volcanic Trail to a point lower down on Quarry Road.
- Pond Trail is a short trail segment that descends to a couple of ponds on the north side of the preserve.

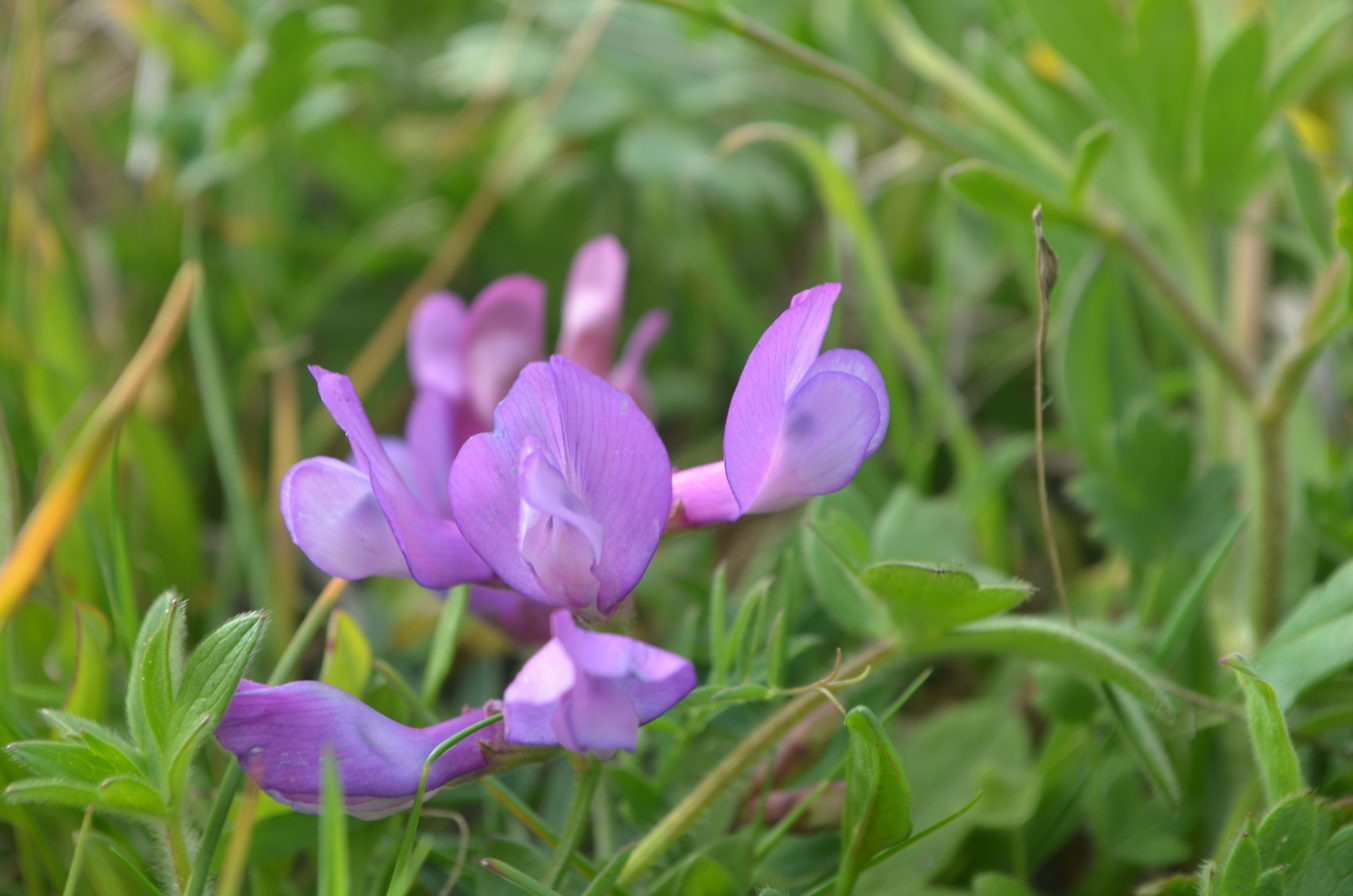
American vetch is native to California and can be found at Sibley Volcanic Regional Preserve.

=== Labyrinths ===
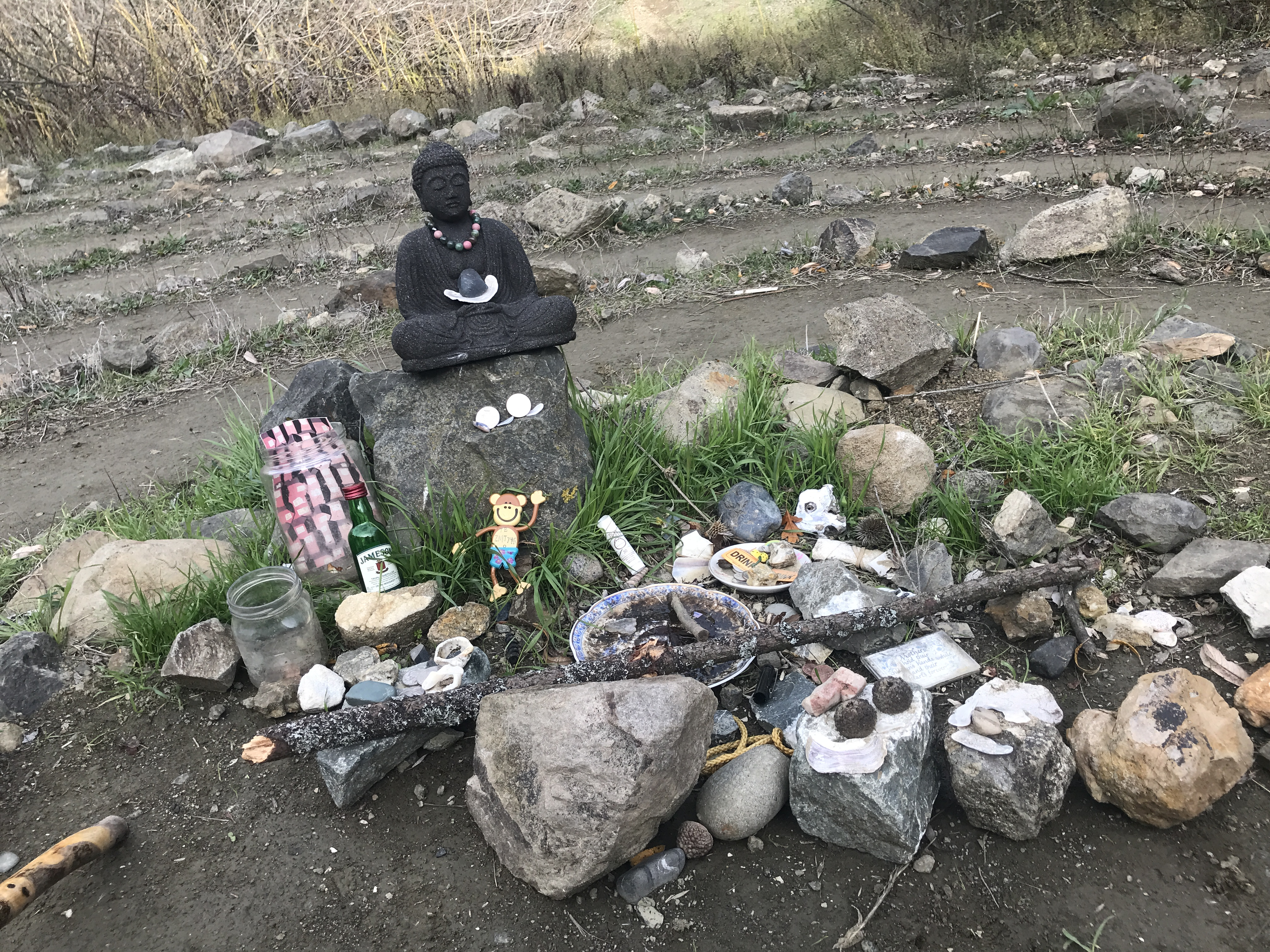
The center of the Mazzariello labyrinth. It contains a statue of the Buddha, as well as what seems to be offerings towards it

At least two man-made labyrinths exist within RSVRP. The first, and arguably most frequently visited, is known as the Mazzariello Labyrinth. Constructed in 1990 and donated as a "gift to the world" by East Bay resident Helena Mazzariello, (Note: Helena Mazzariello is a sculptor, psychic, and shamanic practitioner who lived in Oakland's Montclair District. The labyrinth she created is known as The Sibley Labyrinth, or "Mazzariello's labyrinth") it is a favorite destination for hikers who come to pray, meditate, and examine talismans left in the center by previous visitors. In this labyrinth, she would walk her goats, stating that, "I can enter with a question, and inevitably, I will emerge with some insight. It is a powerful spot." Notwithstanding the official gate hours listed below, Friends of the Labyrinth claims that the labyrinth has visitors 24 hours a day, 7 days a week.

The next marker along the Round Top Loop Trail leads to the Volcanic Trail, which crosses to the left. At Post No. 4, the hiker can see a smaller, heart-shaped labyrinth. It is not nearly as elaborate as the Mazzariello Labyrinth, and apparently not as heavily used.

There have been claims of other, earlier labyrinths hidden in the preserves, but Friends of the Labyrinth dismisses these as urban legends, as no evidence has been found. The organization reports that analysis of high-resolution aerial photographs show no trace of such activity.

== Visiting the park ==
The park is open year-round. The park and gate hours are:

- November - February 7AM - 6PM
- March - October 7AM - 10PM

There is no parking fee and no dog fee.

== See also ==
- Moraga Formation — Miocene epoch basaltic lava formation in park.
- Pliocene California geology
- Volcanism of California
