= Orinda Formation =

Geologic formation in California, United States

- Stratigraphic range: Miocene
- Type: Geologic formation
- Underlies: Moraga Formation
- Overlies: Tice Shale, of Monterey Formation Group

Lithology
- Primary: coarse conglomerates

Location
- Region: Alameda County and Contra Costa County, California
- Country: United States

Type section
- Named for: Orinda, California

The Orinda Formation is a Miocene epoch geologic formation in the Berkeley Hills of the East Bay region of the San Francisco Bay Area, California.

It is found within Alameda County and Contra Costa County.

== Geology ==
The Orinda Formation is a coarse alluvial conglomerates sedimentary formation. It underlies the volcanic Moraga Formation.

It preserves fossils dating back to the Miocene epoch of the Neogene period.

== Geologic Hazards ==
The Orinda Formation is prone to landsliding due to intrinsic properties such as its weak cohesive strength and low friction angle. Landslides less than or equal to 10 acres in size occur as slides, slumps, and earthflows on dip or parallel to dip slopes. In the formation, landslides greater than or equal to 10 acres in size are common to very common and occur as slumps and slides on anti-dip slopes.

== See also ==
- Pliocene California geology
- List of fossiliferous stratigraphic units in California
- Paleontology in California
