= San Leandro Hills =

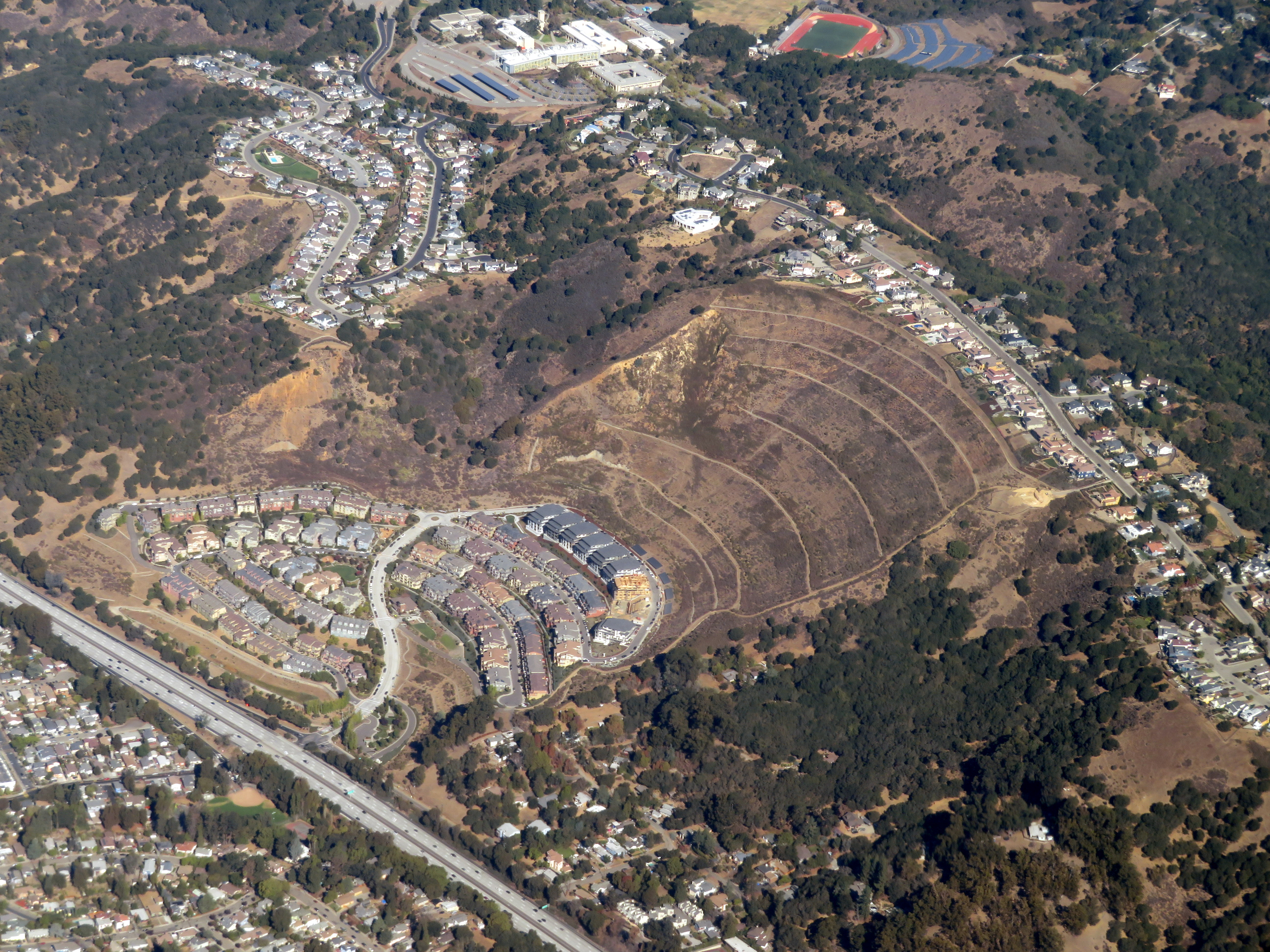
- A housing development in the former Leona Quarry in the San Leandro Hills

Highest point
- Elevation: 314 m (1,030 ft)

Geography
- Location within California
- Country: United States
- State: California
- Region: California Coast Ranges
- District: Alameda County
- Range coordinates: 37°44′49.743″N 122°5′46.869″W
- Topo map: USGS Hayward

The San Leandro Hills are a component of the East Bay Hills, a low mountain range of the Southern Inner California Coast Ranges System, located on the eastern side of the San Francisco Bay. Geologically, they are a southern continuation of the Berkeley Hills to the north. The East Bay Hills refers geologically to all of the ranges east of the Bay from the Hayward Fault in the west to the Calaveras Fault in the east. The United States Geological Survey (USGS) Geographic Names Information System, however, includes the San Leandro Hills as part of the Diablo Range in its list of GPS coordinates for the latter.

They run along the southeastern city limits of Oakland, extending southeastward above the city of San Leandro and the unincorporated community of Castro Valley.

San Leandro Creek drains the canyon along the eastern slope of the hills.
