= Berkeley Hills =

Region of the Pacific Coast Ranges

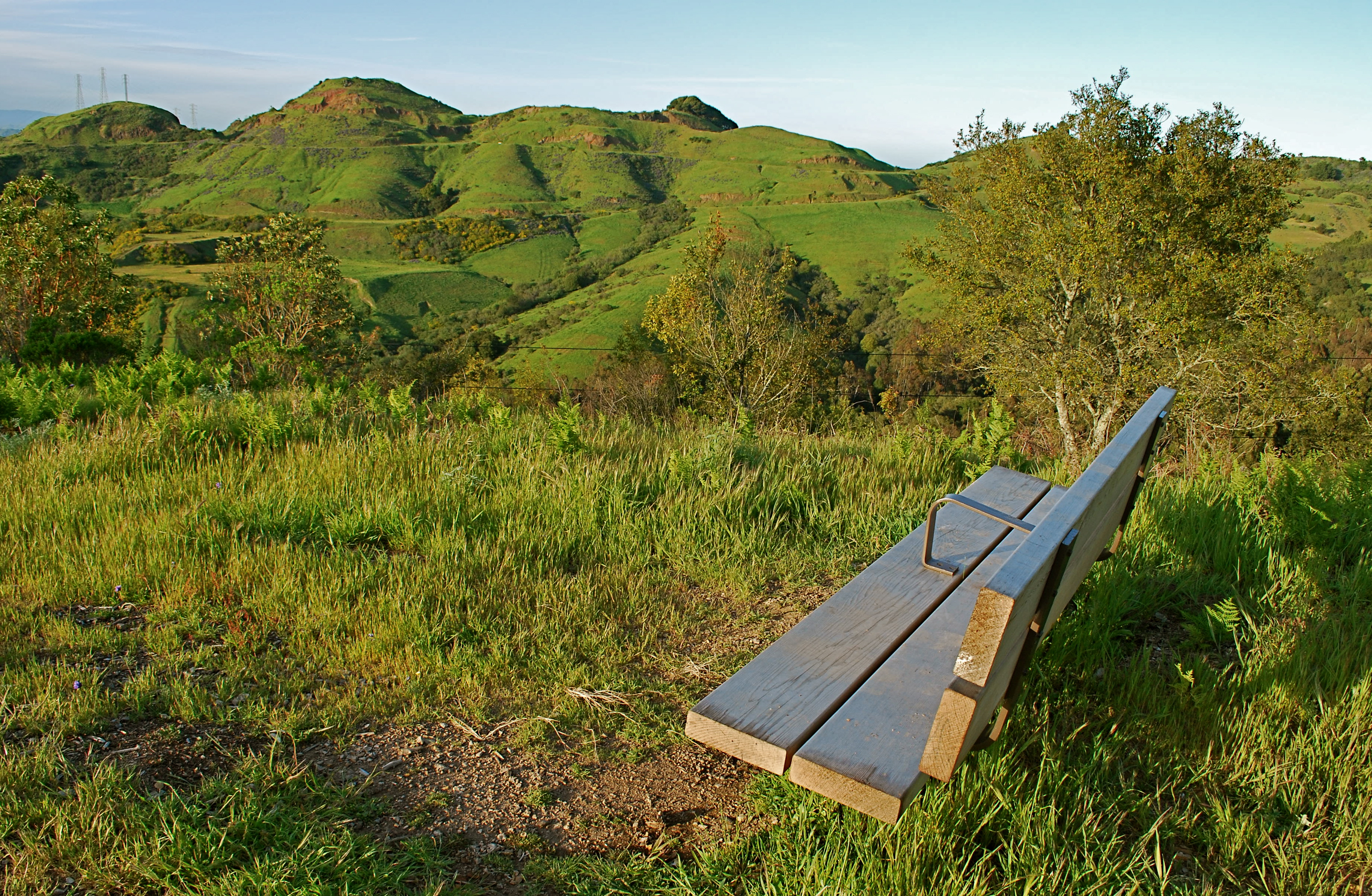

Highest point
- Elevation: 581 m (1,906 ft)

Geography
- Location within California Location within the United States

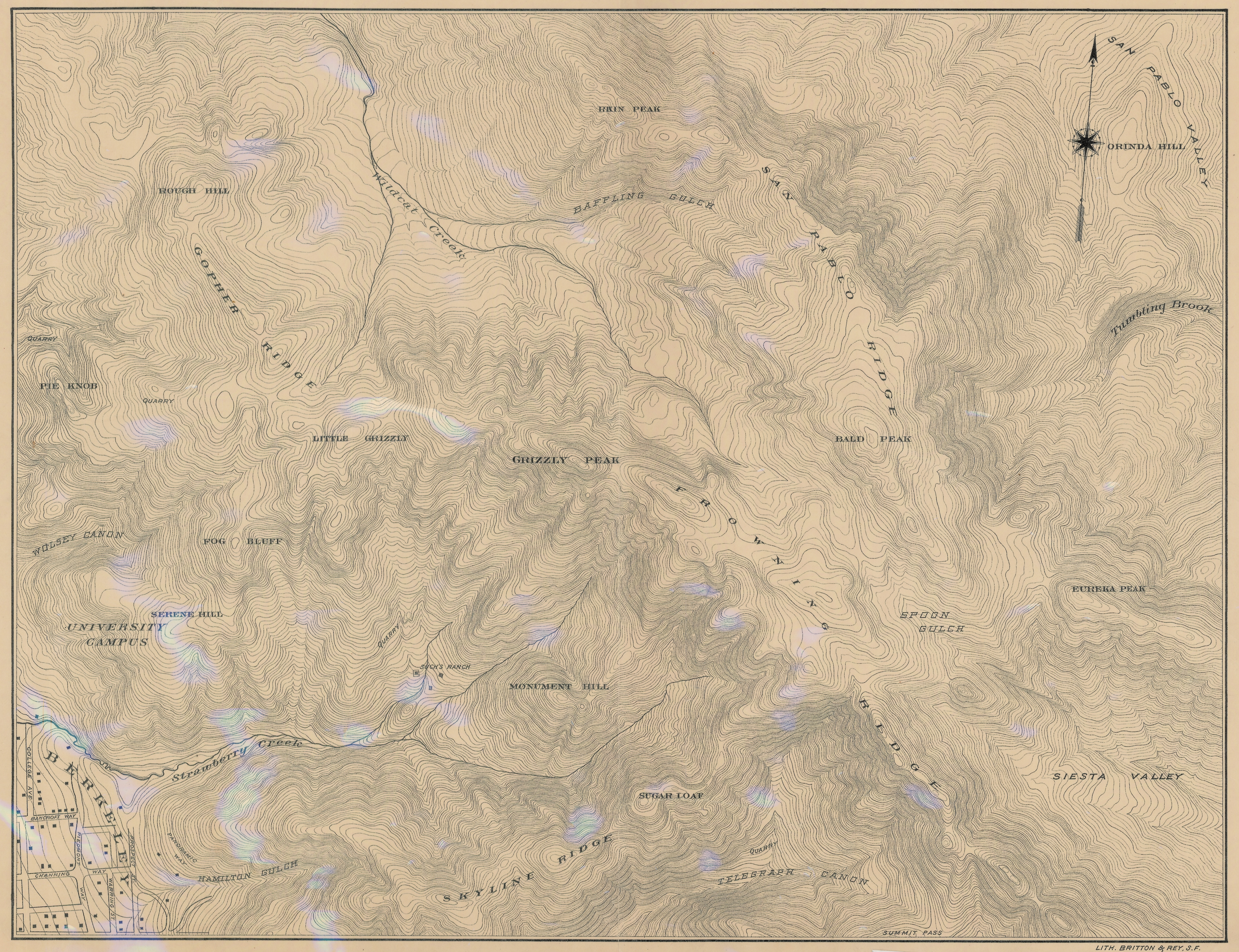
- Topographic map of a portion of the Berkeley Hills
- Country: United States
- State: California
- District: Alameda County
- Range coordinates: 37°52′58″N 122°14′16″W
- Topo map: USGS Briones Valley

The Berkeley Hills are a range of the Pacific Coast Ranges, and overlook the northeast side of the valley that encompasses San Francisco Bay. They were previously called the "Contra Costa Range/Hills" (from the original Spanish Sierra de la Contra Costa), but with the establishment of Berkeley and the University of California, the name was updated by geographers and gazetteers.

== Geology ==
The Berkeley Hills are bounded by the major Hayward Fault along their western base, and the minor Wildcat fault on their eastern side. The highest peaks are Grizzly Peak, with an elevation of 1,754 feet (535 m); Round Top, an extinct volcano with an elevation of 1,761 feet (537 m); and William Rust Summit at an elevation of 1,004 feet (306 m).

Vollmer Peak (elevation 1,905 feet/581 m), although commonly thought to be part of the Berkeley Hills, is actually located on the adjacent San Pablo Ridge near the point where it meets the Berkeley Hills at the head of Wildcat Canyon. Vollmer Peak was named in honor of the first police chief of the City of Berkeley, August Vollmer. It was formerly known as "Bald Peak", and as "Rocky Mound" in the 19th century.

Over time, the widespread deposition of loose sediments along the hillsides, along with fracturing from the fault and other factors make these hills susceptible to landslides. These landslides are more likely to be caused by precipitation than by a seismic event.

== Development ==
Much of the west slope of the Berkeley Hills has residential neighborhoods of mostly single family homes, except on the land of University of California, Berkeley. Most streets are narrow and tend to follow the contours of the terrain, although three streets, Marin Avenue, Moeser Lane, and Potrero Avenue, run directly toward the ridgeline. Other roads to the ridgeline wind their way up the canyons. Grizzly Peak and Skyline Boulevards follow the top of the ridge. Many neighborhoods in the Berkeley Hills are home to the more affluent residents of Berkeley and Oakland.

Preservation

The east slope of the Berkeley Hills is mostly preserved or partially developed wildland, much of it owned by the East Bay Regional Park District and the East Bay Municipal Utility District (EBMUD). From north to south, the parks are Wildcat Canyon Regional Park, Tilden Regional Park (includes Vollmer and Grizzly Peaks), Sibley Volcanic Regional Park (includes Round Top), Huckleberry Botanic Regional Preserve, Redwood Regional Park (enfolding Roberts Regional Recreation Area), Anthony Chabot Regional Park, Lake Chabot Regional Park, and Cull Canyon Regional Recreation Area. Claremont Canyon Regional Preserve, and Temescal Regional Park are lower on the western slopes while Las Trampas Regional Wilderness is lower on the eastern slope above Danville.

Tunnels

The Berkeley Hills are pierced by several tunnels. The Claremont Tunnel brings water from an EBMUD treatment plant in Orinda to points west. The Berkeley Hills Tunnel serves the Yellow Line of the Bay Area Rapid Transit (BART) system. The four bores of the Caldecott Tunnel carry State Highway 24 between Oakland and Contra Costa County.

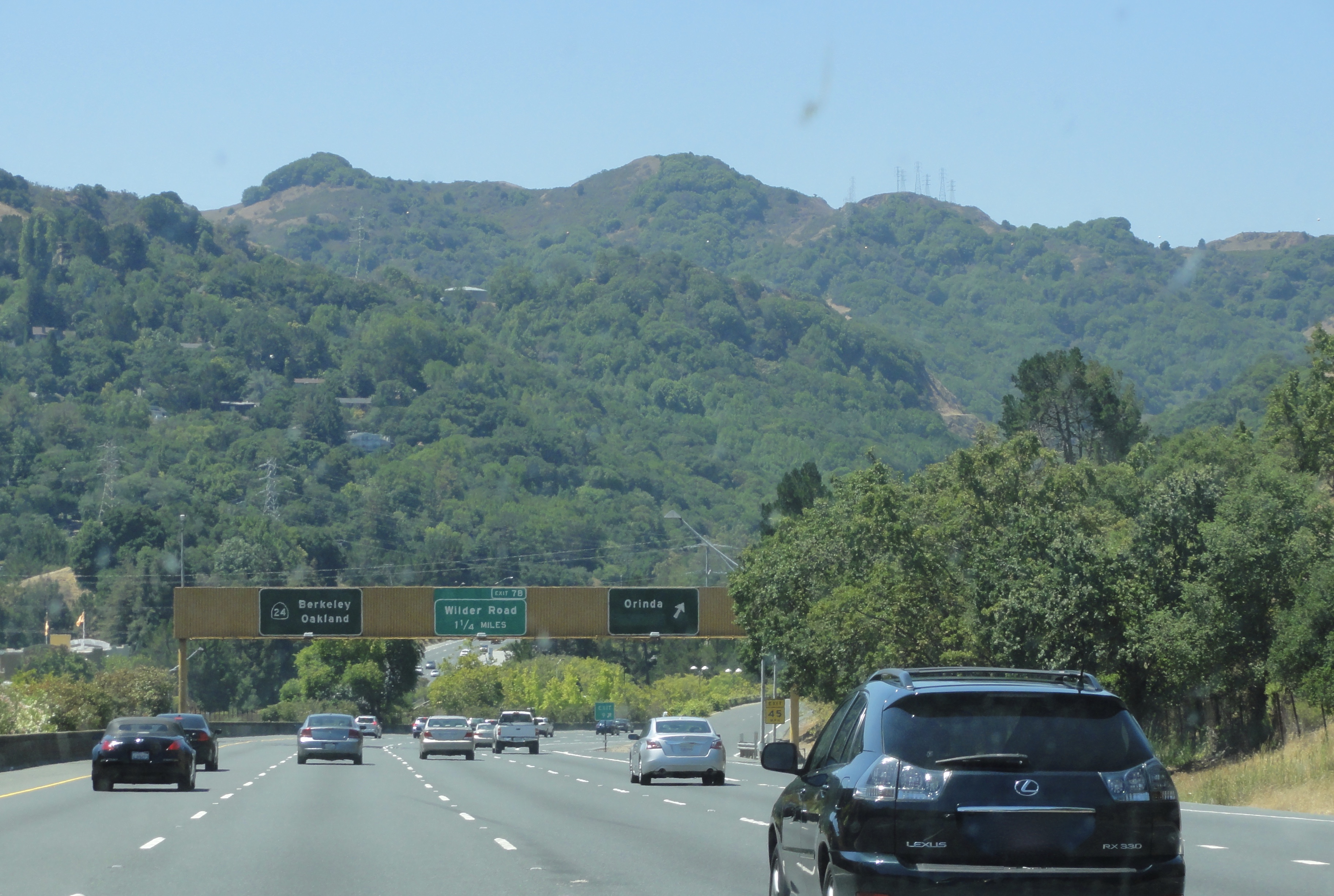
The Berkeley Hills as seen from CA 24 near Orinda.

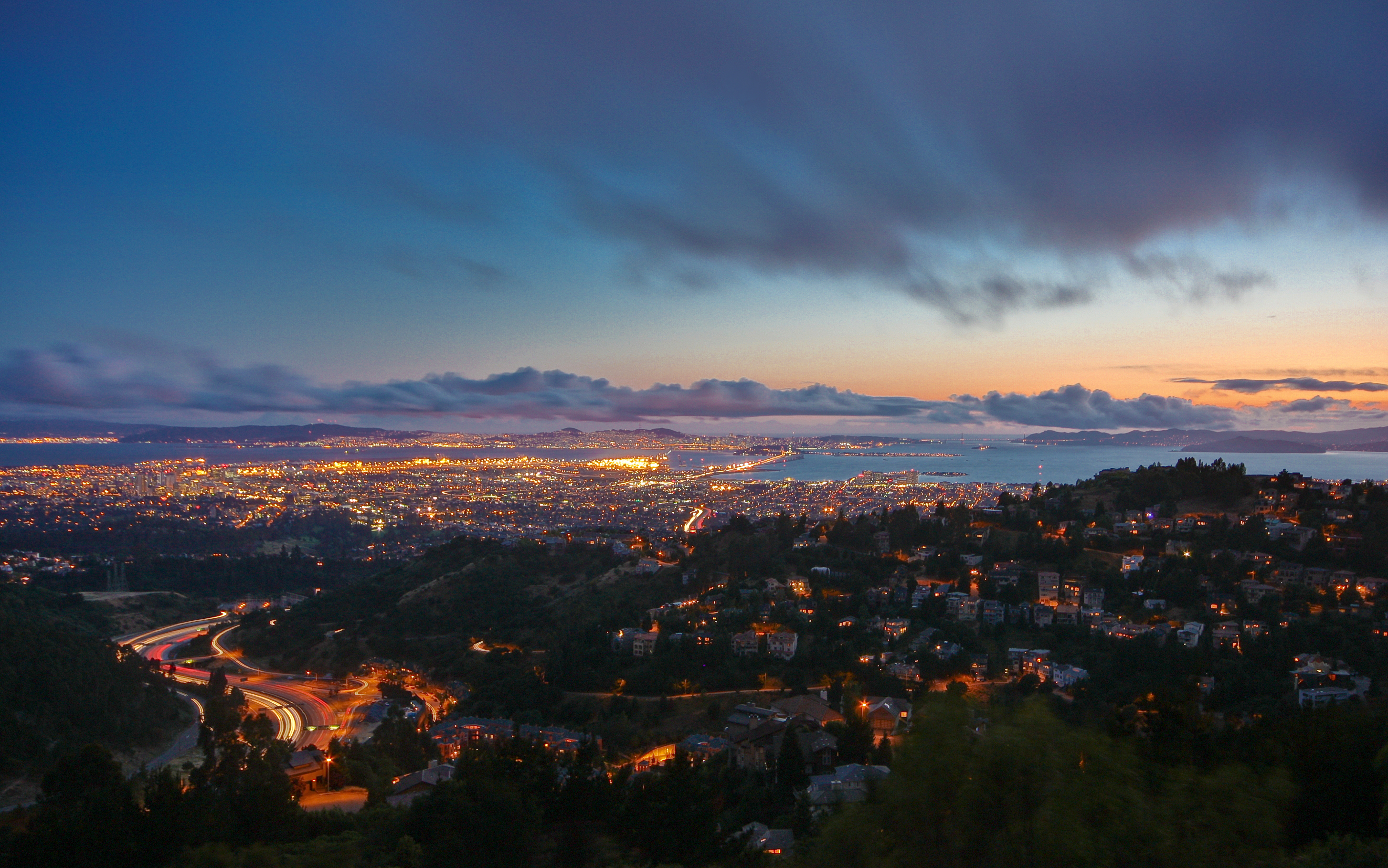
Oakland and the Bay from Grizzly Peak Blvd.

== Usage ==
It is common to hear the term "Oakland Hills" to refer to that section of the Berkeley Hills that runs along the east side of Oakland. As a proper name or recognized toponym, it is technically incorrect. When used on maps, the exact south end of the "Berkeley Hills" is unclear, but the maps of the USGS show them stretching well south into the northeastern portion of Oakland. It does not, in any case, correspond to any political boundaries, only to a geographic feature (much as "San Francisco Bay" is not limited to that stretch of the Pacific inlet within the bounds of the City and County of San Francisco). The ridge extends south through Oakland and San Leandro to the drainage of San Leandro Creek called Castro Valley, and geologically, continues southward above the line of the Hayward Fault. In the section above East Oakland to Castro Valley, the ridge appears on most maps as the San Leandro Hills.

The northern extent of the proper name "Berkeley Hills" is less indefinite; most maps including those of the USGS apply the name along the entire ridge as it runs continuously right up to the mouth of Wildcat Canyon in Richmond. The eastern slopes of the Berkeley Hills lie entirely outside of the city of Berkeley within Contra Costa County.

Another common usage is East Bay Hills, but its application to any particular range is unclear. It may refer to all of the ranges east of the Bay, from the Berkeley Hills to the Diablo Range and all the ranges between.

== Ecology ==
The Berkeley Hills are a region of great biological diversity as part of Pacific Coastal Region of California and the San Francisco Bay ecosystem. Much of the area is covered by grassland which favors the southwest facing slopes. Livestock used to inhabit this area and graze on the grasslands. In the 1930's to establish a watershed system and regional parks, these animals were removed from certain areas which caused parts of the grasslands to get taken over by shrublands. Amongst the north east hills, Baccharis Brushland and Oak Woodland are most prominent with Coast live oak and California bay laurel as some of the most prolific trees. Past Eucalyptus tree farming during the early 20th century has also introduced large Eucalyptus groves scattered across the Berkeley Hills.

The area welcomes a wide variety of birds, black-tailed deer, coyote, ground squirrel, striped skunk, western terrestrial garter snake, gray fox, bobcat, and red-tailed hawk. There are also periodic sightings of mountain lions amongst the Oak Woodland. Four protected species also call the Berkeley Hills their home, the San Francisco tree lupine moth, Alameda whipsnake, Callippe silverspot, and Bay checkerspot. Additionally, the grassland acts as an annual foraging spot for the northern harrier, American kestrel, prairie falcon, and turkey vulture.

== Climatic effects ==
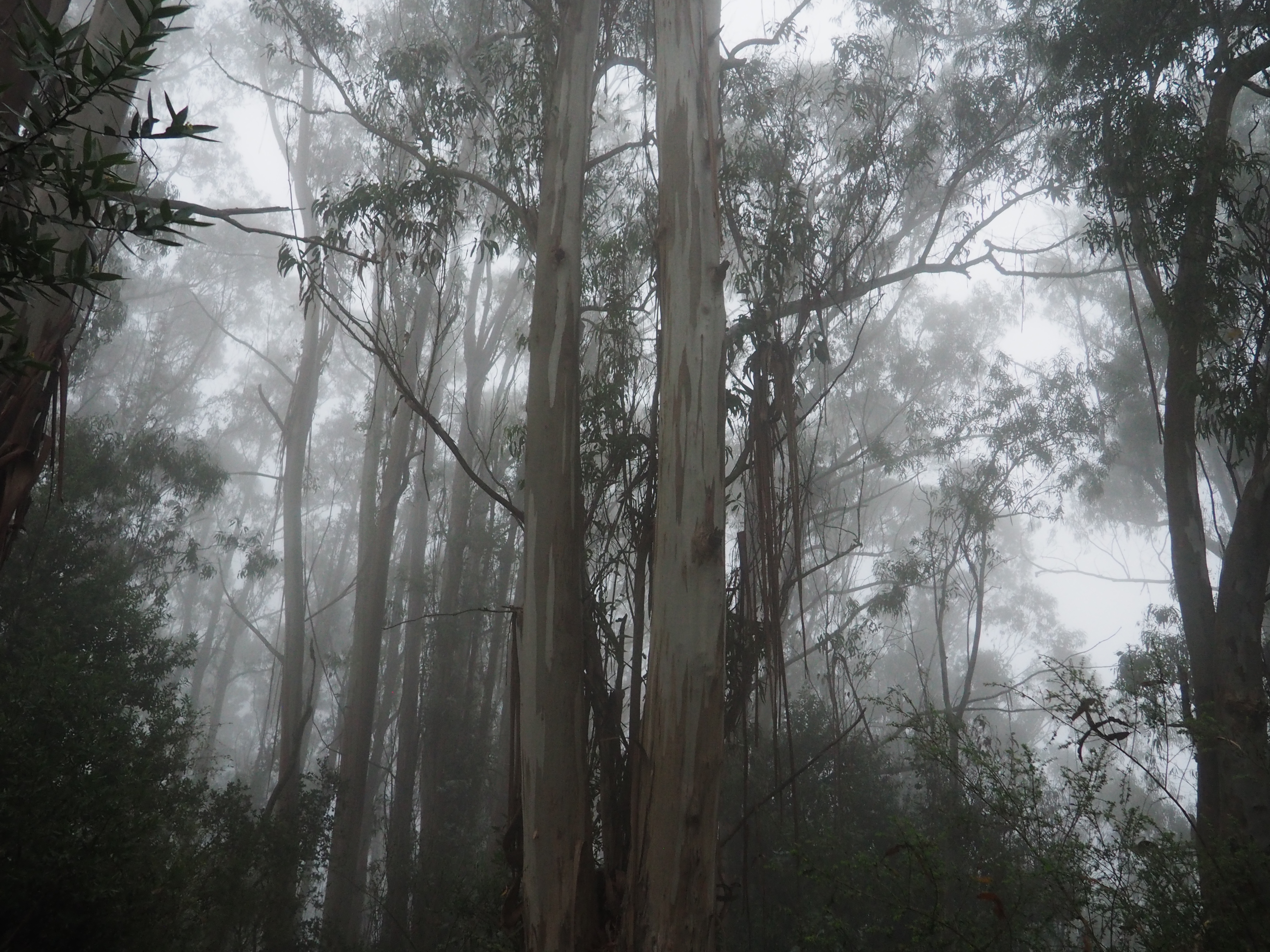
Summer marine fog in a eucalyptus forest near Picnic View Ridge at UC Berkeley.

The Berkeley Hills affect the local climate by their elevation. The oceanic marine layer, which develops during the summer, bringing fog and low clouds with it, is usually less than 2,000 feet deep and thus is blocked by the range. This produces a "fog shadow" effect to the east, which is warmer than areas west of the hills. The westerly wind that carries the marine layer through the Golden Gate typically splits its flow as it hits the Berkeley Hills producing a southerly wind from Berkeley northward and a northerly wind in the direction of Oakland.

In winter during spells of tule fog inland, a reverse situation occurs, with the fog usually confined to areas east of the hills, although occasionally, the inland fog pours in from the north, around the hills by way of the Carquinez Strait.

The Berkeley Hills affect rainfall; when the wind is perpendicular to the hills (southwest wind) during a storm, air is forced to rise, cooling and condensing additional moisture, increasing the precipitation on the western slopes and leaving areas east of the hills drier. Especially cold storms occasionally deposit wet snow on the peaks.

In spring and fall, sinking air from aloft combining with inland high pressure periodically sends a hot, dry, and gusty northeasterly wind across the ridges of the Berkeley Hills, posing a fire danger, which in the 20th century produced several wildfires, two of which caused major damage to Berkeley and Oakland. In the 1991 fire, residential neighborhoods as well as acres of vegetation were burnt and destroyed.(See 1923 Berkeley Fire and 1991 Oakland firestorm).
