= List of parks in Oakland, California =

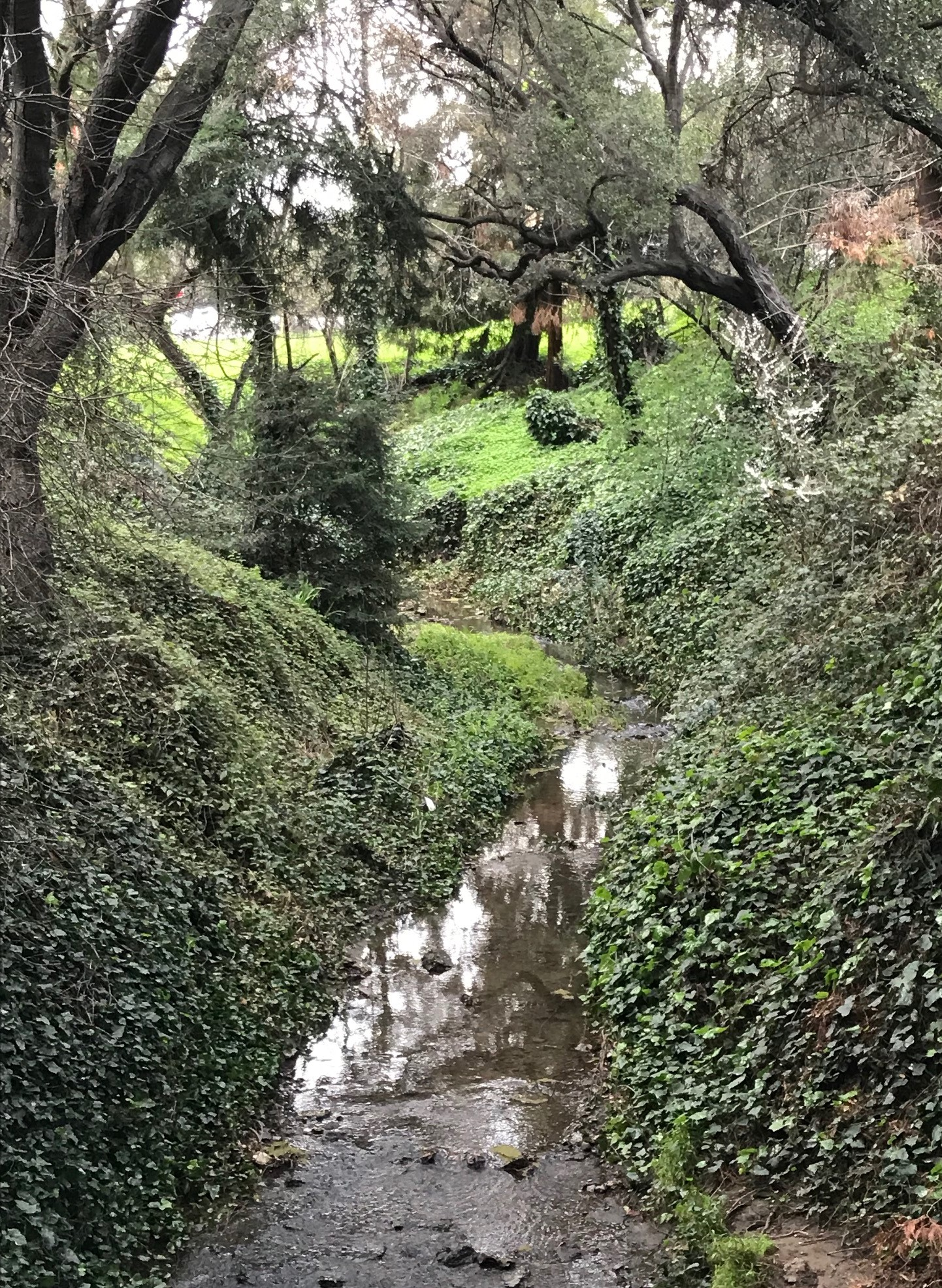
Oak Glen Park

This is a list of parks in Oakland, California.

== City ==
- 25th Street Mini Park — 0.28 acres (1,100 m^{2}) — 25th Street, Oakland, CA
- 85th Avenue Mini Park — 0.33 acres (1,300 m^{2}) — 1712 85th Avenue, Oakland, CA 94621
- 88th Avenue Mini Park — 0.31 acres (1,300 m^{2}) — 1722 88th Avenue, Oakland, CA 94621
- Allendale Park — 3.24 acres (13,100 m^{2}) — 3711 Suter Street, Oakland, CA 94619
- Arroyo Viejo Park — 18.75 acres (75,900 m^{2}) — 7701 Krause Avenue, Oakland, CA 94605
- Avenue Terrance Park — 0.93 acres (3,800 m^{2}) — 4369 Bennett Place, Oakland, CA 94602
- Ayala Park — Ayala Ave & 57th Street, Oakland, CA 94609
- Beaconsfield Canyon — Beaconsfield Place, Oakland, CA 94611
- Bella Vista Park — 1.74 acres (7,000 m^{2}) — 1025 East 28th Street, Oakland, CA
- Bertha Port Park — Goss Street & Wood Street & 8th Street, Oakland, CA 94607
- Brookdale Park — 4.66 acres (18,900 m^{2}) — 2535 High Street, Oakland, CA 94601
- Burckhalter Park — 4.46 acres (18,000 m^{2}) — 4062 Edwards Avenue, Oakland, CA 94605
- Bushrod Park — 10.12 acres (41,000 m^{2}) — 560 59th Street, Oakland, CA 94609
- Caldecott Field/North Oakland Regional Sports Center — 6900 Broadway, Oakland, Ca 94618
- Carney Park — 0.44 acres (1,800 m^{2}) — 10501 Acalanes Drive, Oakland, CA 94603
- Carter-Gilmore/Greenman Field — 1390 66th Ave & Lucille Street, Oakland, CA 94621
- Central Reservoir Park — 3.78 acres (15,300 m^{2}) — 2506 East 29th Street, Oakland, CA 94602
- Cesar Chavez Park — Foothill Boulevard, Oakland, CA
- Chabot Park — 3.39 acres (13,700 m^{2}) — 6850 Chabot Road, Oakland, CA 94618
- Channel Park — 4.49 acres (18,200 m^{2}) — 1 10th Street & 21 7th Street, Oakland, CA 94607
- Chinese Garden Park — 1.4 acres (5,700 m^{2}) — 7th Street & Harrison Street, Oakland, CA
- Clinton Square Park — 1.85 acres (7,500 m^{2}) — 1230 6th Avenue, Oakland, CA 94606
- Colby Park — 0.35 acres (1,400 m^{2}) — 61st & Colby Street, Oakland, CA
- Coliseum Gardens Park — 4.85 acres (19,600 m^{2}) — 966 66th Avenue, Oakland, CA 94621
- Columbian Gardens Park — 2.33 acres (9,400 m^{2}) — 9920 Empire Road, Oakland, CA 94603
- Concordia Park — 3.51 acres (14,200 m^{2}) — 2901 64th Avenue, Oakland, CA
- Crescent Park — 2.03 acres (8,200 m^{2}) — Chester Street, Oakland, CA
- Cypress Freeway Memorial Park — 14th and Mandela Parkway, Oakland, CA 94607
- DeFremery Park — 9.4 acres (38,000 m^{2}) — 1651 Adeline Street, Oakland, CA 94607
- Dimond Park — 14.31 acres (57,900 m^{2}) — 3860 Hanly Road, Oakland, CA 94602
- Dolphin Mini Park — 1299 73rd Avenue, Oakland, CA 94621
- Dover Street Park — 5707 Dover Street, Oakland, CA 94609
- Driver Plaza — Stanford Avenue & Adeline Street, Oakland, CA 94608
- Dunsmuir Estate Park — 30.16 acres (122,100 m^{2}) — 61 Covington Street, Oakland, CA 94605
- Durant Mini Park — 0.32 acres (1,300 m^{2}) — 29th Street & MLK Jr Way, Oakland, CA
- Eastshore Park — 4.47 acres (18,100 m^{2}) — 550 El Embarcadero & Lakeshore Ave, Oakland, CA 94610
- Elmhurst Lyons Field — 1800 98th Avenue, Oakland, CA 94603
- Estuary Channel Park — 7.03 acres (28,400 m^{2}) — 5 Embarcadero, Oakland, CA 94606
- Firestorm Memorial Garden — Tunnel Road & Hiller Drive, Oakland, CA 94618
- Fitzgerald Park — Fitzgerald Street & Peralta Street, Oakland, CA
- FM Smith Park — 1.66 acres (6,700 m^{2}) — 1969 Park Boulevard, Oakland, CA 94606
- Foothill Meadows Extension — 0.19 acres (770 m^{2}) — 1600 38th Avenue, Oakland, CA 94601
- Foothill Meadows Park — 1.62 acres (6,600 m^{2}) — 3705 Foothill Boulevard, Oakland, CA 94601
- Frank Ogawa Firescape Garden &mdash 6900 Broadway, Oakland, CA 94611
- Frog Park (Rockridge-Temescal Greenbelt); Along Temescal Creek, Hudson Street to Redondo Park
- Franklin Park — 2.05 acres (8,300 m^{2}) — 1010 East 15th Street, Oakland, CA 94606
- Franklin Plaza &mdash 418 22nd Street, Oakland, CA 94612
- Fruitvale Bridge Park — 0.33 acres (1,300 m^{2}) — 3205 Alameda Avenue, Oakland, CA 94601
- Garber Park &mdash Alvarado Road & Claremont Avenue, Oakland, CA 94705
- Garfield Park — 1.49 acres (6,000 m^{2}) — 2260 Foothill Boulevard, Oakland, CA 94606
- Glen Echo Park — 0.72 acres (2,900 m^{2}) — Panama Court & Monte Vista Avenue, Oakland, CA
- Golden Gate Park — 1075 62nd St, Oakland, CA 94608
- Grove Shafter Park — 5.55 acres (22,500 m^{2}) — Martin Luther King Jr Way & 36th Street, Oakland, CA 94609
- Hardy Dog Park — 2.16 acres (8,700 m^{2}) — 491 Hardy Street, Oakland, CA 94618
- Helen McGregor Plaza Park — 0.3 acres (1,200 m^{2}) — MLK Jr Way & 5210 West Street, Oakland, CA
- Henry J. Kaiser Memorial Park; 1900 Rashida Muhammad St, Oakland, CA 94612
- Holly Mini Park — 0.35 acres (1,400 m^{2}) — 9830 Holly Street, Oakland, CA 94603
- Jefferson Square — 1.42 acres (5,700 m^{2}) — 618 Jefferson Street, Oakland, CA 94607
- Joaquin Miller Park — 500 acres (2.0 km^{2}) — 3590 Sanborn Drive, Oakland, CA 94602
- Josie de la Cruz Park &mdash 1637 Fruitvale Avenue, Oakland, CA 94601
- King Estates Park &mdash 8501 Fontaine Street, Oakland, CA 94605
- Joseph Knowland State Arboretum and Park 453 acres (1.83 km^{2}) — Golf Links Road, Oakland, CA 94605
- Lafayette Square Park — 1.42 acres (5,700 m^{2}) — 635 11th Street, Oakland, CA 94607
- Lakeside Park — 75 acres (300,000 m^{2}) — 666 Bellevue Avenue, Oakland, CA 94610
- Lazear Park — 0.1 acres (400 m^{2}) — 850 - 29th Avenue, Oakland, CA 94601
- Leona Heights Park &mdash 444 Mountain Boulevard, Oakland, CA 94619
- Lincoln Square Park — 1.38 acres (5,600 m^{2}) — 261 11th Street, Oakland, CA 94607
- Linden Park — 0.46 acres (1,900 m^{2}) — 998 42nd Street, Oakland, CA 94609
- Lowell Park — 8.74 acres (35,400 m^{2}) — 1180 14th Street, Oakland, CA 94607
- Mandana Plaza Park — 0.53 acres (2,100 m^{2}) — 600 Mandana Ave & Lakeshore Ave, Oakland, CA
- Manzanita Park — 1 acre (4,000 m^{2}) — 2701 22nd Avenue, Oakland, CA 94606
- Marj Saunders Park &mdash 5750 Ascot Drive, Oakland, CA 94611
- Marston Campbell Park — 3.1 acres (13,000 m^{2}) — 17th Street & West Street, Oakland, CA
- Maxwell Park — 1.38 acres (5,600 m^{2}) — 4618 Allendale Avenue, Oakland, CA 94619
- McClymonds Mini Park — 0.24 acres (970 m^{2}) — 2528 Linden Street, Oakland, CA 94607
- McCrea Park — 4.82 acres (19,500 m^{2}) — 4460 Shepherd Street, Oakland, CA 94619
- Montclair Park — 7.3 acres (30,000 m^{2}) — 6300 Moraga Avenue, Oakland, CA 94611
- Morcom Rose Garden — 7.76 acres (31,400 m^{2}) — 700 Jean Street, Oakland, CA 94610
- Mosswood Park — 11 acres (45,000 m^{2}) — 3612 Webster Street, Oakland, CA 94609
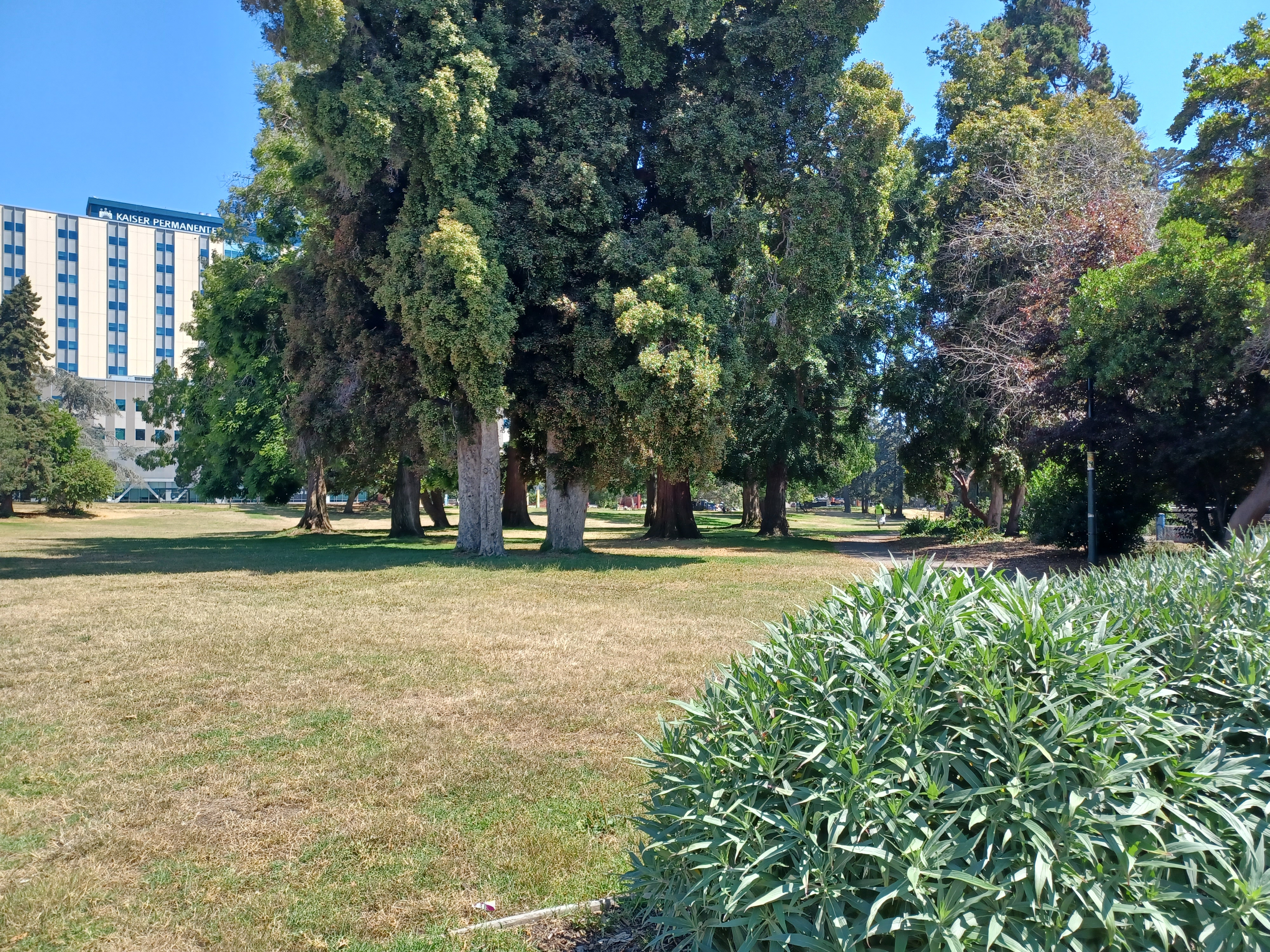
  Mosswood Park
- Nicol Park — 0.23 acres (930 m^{2}) — Nicol Avenue & Collidge Avenue, Oakland, CA
- Oak Glen Park — 2.79 acres (11,300 m^{2}) — 3390 Richmond Boulevard, Oakland, CA
- Officer Willie Wilkins Park &mdash 9700 C Street, Oakland, CA 94603
- Ostrander Park — 2.4 acres (9,700 m^{2}) — 6151 Broadway Terrace, Oakland, CA 94618
- Park Boulevard Plaza Park — 0.76 acres (3,100 m^{2}) — 2100 Park Boulevard, Oakland, CA
- Peralta Hacienda Park — 4.47 acres (18,100 m^{2}) — 2500 34th Avenue, Oakland, CA 94601
- Peralta Oaks Park — 3.8 acres (15,000 m^{2}) — Peralta Oaks & 106th Avenue, Oakland, CA
- Peralta Park — 4.08 acres (16,500 m^{2}) — 94 East 10th Street, Oakland, CA
- Piedmont Plaza Park — 0.03 acres (120 m^{2}) — 4182 Piedmont Avenue, Oakland, CA 94611
- Pine Knoll Park — 1.33 acres (5,400 m^{2}) — Lakeshore Ave & Hanover Ave, Oakland, CA
- Pinto Park — 3.57 acres (14,400 m^{2}) — 5000 Redwood Road, Oakland, CA 94619
- Poplar Park — 2.5 acres (10,000 m^{2}) — 3131 Union Street, Oakland, CA 94607
- Raimondi Park — 1800 Wood Street, Oakland, CA 94607
- Rainbow Park — 2.44 acres (9,900 m^{2}) — 5800 International Boulevard, Oakland, CA 94621
- Rancho Peralta Park — 34 East 10th Street, Oakland, CA
- Redwood Heights Park — 2.93 acres (11,900 m^{2}) — 3883 Aliso Avenue, Oakland, CA 94619
- Rockridge Park — 0.28 acres (1,100 m^{2}) — 6090 Rockridge Boulevard, Oakland, CA 94618
- Saint Andrews Park — 0.17 acres (690 m^{2}) — 32nd Street & San Pablo Avenue, Oakland, CA
- San Antonio Park — 11.62 acres (47,000 m^{2}) — 1701 East 19th Street, Oakland, CA 94606
- Sequoia Lodge Park — 11.67 acres (47,200 m^{2}) — 2666 Mountain Boulevard, Oakland, CA 94611
- Sheffield Village Park — 1.34 acres (5,400 m^{2}) — 247 Marlow Drive, Oakland, CA 94605
- Shepherd Canyon Park &mdash 6000 Shepherd Canyon Road, Oakland, CA 94611
- Snow Park — 4.2 acres (17,000 m^{2}) — 19th Street & Harrison Street, Oakland, CA
- Sobrante Park — 4.69 acres (19,000 m^{2}) — 470 El Paseo Drive, Oakland, CA 94603
- South Prescott Park — 3rd Street/Chester Avenue, Oakland, CA 94607
- Splash Pad Park — 0.62 acres (2,500 m^{2}) — Grand Avenue & Lakepark, Oakland, CA
- Stonehurst Park — 2.67 acres (10,800 m^{2}) — 10315 E Street, Oakland, CA
- Tassafaronga Park — 2.5 acres (10,000 m^{2}) — 85th Avenue & E Street, Oakland, CA
- Temescal Creek Park — 1.07 acres (4,300 m^{2}) — Cavour & Clifton Street, Oakland, CA
- Tomas Melero-Smith &mdash 1461 65th Avenue, Oakland, CA 94621
- Tyrone Carney Park &mdash 10501 Acalanes Drive, Oakland, CA 94603
- Union Plaza — 0.42 acres (1,700 m^{2}) — 3399 Peralta Street, Oakland, CA 94608
- Union Point Park — 2311 Embarcadero, Oakland, CA 94606
- Vantage Point Park — 0.4 acres (1,600 m^{2}) — 1198 13th Avenue, Oakland, CA 94606
- Verdese Carter Park — 3.36 acres (13,600 m^{2}) — 9600 Sunnyside Street, Oakland, CA 94603
- Wade Johnson Park — 2.52 acres (10,200 m^{2}) — 1250 Kirkham Street, Oakland, CA 94607
- William "Bill" Patterson Park &mdash 9175 Edes Avenue, Oakland, CA 94603
- William Wood Park &mdash 2920 McKillop Road, Oakland, CA 94602
- Willow Mini Park — 0.94 acres (3,800 m^{2}) — 14th Street & Willow Street, Oakland, CA
- Wilma Chan Park &mdash 810 Jackson Street, Oakland, CA 94607
- Wood Park — 5.54 acres (22,400 m^{2}) — 2920 McKillop Road, Oakland, CA 94602
- Wood Street Pocket Park &mdash Wood Street & 14th Street, Oakland, CA 94607

== State and regional ==
McLaughlin Eastshore State Park is partially in the city of Oakland and although it is a California State Park, it is managed by the East Bay Regional Park District.

The following nine East Bay Regional Parks are entirely or partially in the city of Oakland:

- Anthony Chabot Regional Park
- Claremont Canyon Regional Preserve
- Dr. Aurelia Reinhardt Redwood Regional Park
- Huckleberry Botanic Regional Preserve
- Judge John Sutter Regional Shoreline
- Leona Canyon Regional Open Space Preserve
- Roberts Regional Recreation Area
- Robert Sibley Volcanic Regional Preserve
- Temescal Regional Recreation Area
