= TRRA (disambiguation) =

TRRA is the Terminal Railroad Association of St. Louis.

TRRA may also stand for:

- Toronto Region Research Alliance, Canada
- Temescal Regional Recreational Area, California, U.S.
- Taranaki Rugby Referee's Association, affiliated to the Taranaki Rugby Football Union, New Zealand
