= Frog Park (Rockridge-Temescal Greenbelt) =

Park in Oakland, California, United States

Rockridge-Temescal Greenbelt / Frog Park
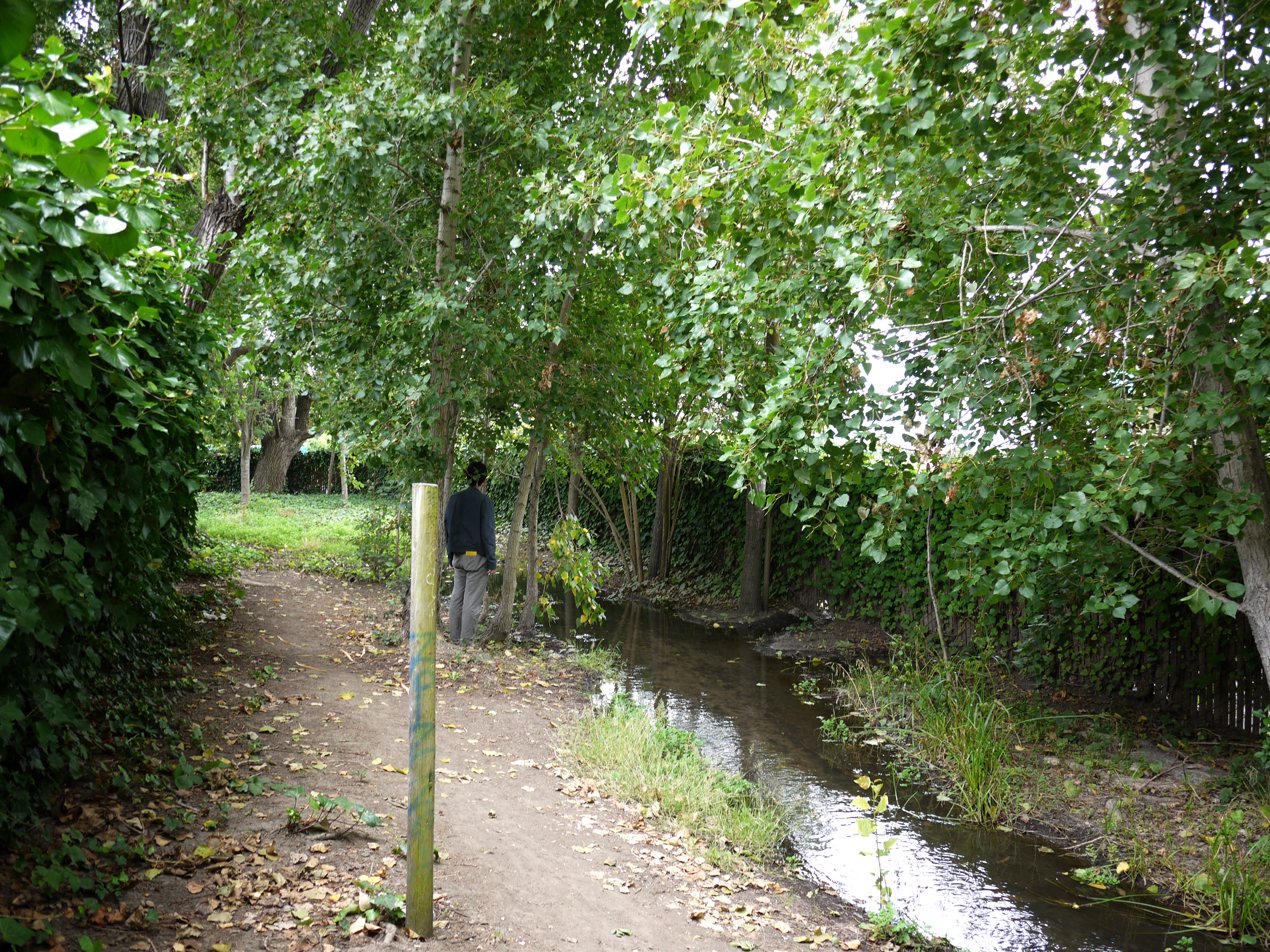
- Frog Park in 2011, showing the reconstituted creek filled by water pumped up from the culvert below.
- Interactive map of Rockridge-Temescal Greenbelt / Frog Park
- Nearest city: Oakland, California, USA
- Coordinates: 37°50′30″N 122°15′27″W
- Elevation: 130–165 ft (40–50 m)
- Created: Friends of the Rockridge-Temescal Greenbelt
- Website: https://www.frogpark.org

The Rockridge-Temescal Greenbelt also commonly known as Frog Park is a public park and greenway that connects the neighborhoods of Temescal and Rockridge in Oakland, California.

The land it sits on was designated as a public space during the 1960s undergrounding of the Temescal Creek, which now runs underneath the park. Park construction began in 2001, the scope of which encompasses two older parks: Hardy and Redondo subsequently popularly known as Big Frog and Little Frog parks. Its construction was led by the community volunteer group Friends of the Rockridge-Temescal Greenbelt (FROG), which continues to maintain and improve the park. While Temescal Creek remains mostly underground, the construction of the park brought back a reconstituted creek filled by water pumped up from the culvert below.

== Description and features ==
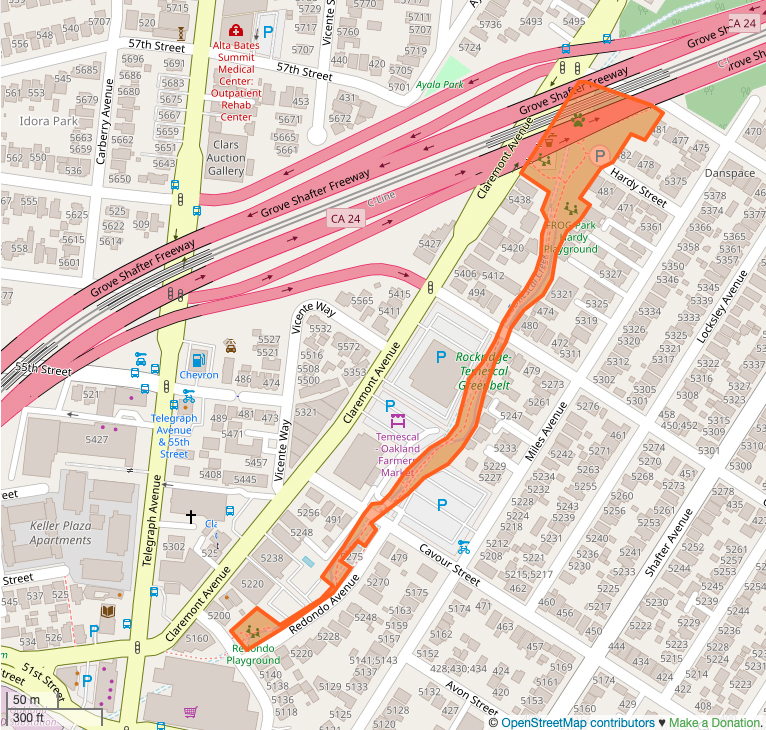
Map of the Rockridge-Temescal Greenbelt Park/Frog Park (2022).

=== Location, shape, and amenities ===
The park is a thin stretch snaking for three blocks from Hudson to Clarke streets and running parallel to Claremont Avenue, in Oakland, California. It consists of the Hardy Park on its northern edge, the Redondo Park on its southern edge, and a greenbelt connecting the two. The community-built play structures in those two parks are popularly known as Big Frog and Little Frog parks. The Hardy Park at northern area contains a dog park (since 1995), basketball courts, swings, picnic area, and other play structures.

The greenbelt runs for three blocks and a distance of 0.3 miles (0.48 km) with a paved pathway. A reconstituted creek filled by water pumped up from the culvert below runs intermittently through it. On the southern end - the Little Frog park contains another, smaller playground designed for younger children.

=== Public art exhibits ===
Near the northern edge of the park, under the overpass of Highway 24, there is a 120-foot-long Oceanus mural painted in 1977. It depicts an underwater panorama of sea creatures and divers, by artist Gary Graham and a team of students. In 2003 it was restored by the original artist also with students from a local arts college. The mural was one of the first to be authorized by Caltrans.

The pathway is lined with artistic and interpretive design elements referencing the history and ecology of the creek, designed by Oakland artist Mark Brest Van Kempen. Bronze castings of wildlife are hidden throughout the park. These elements were the result of a public art project started in 2005, with local artists and community selecting among multiple submissions. They were installed in phases between 2009 and 2010.

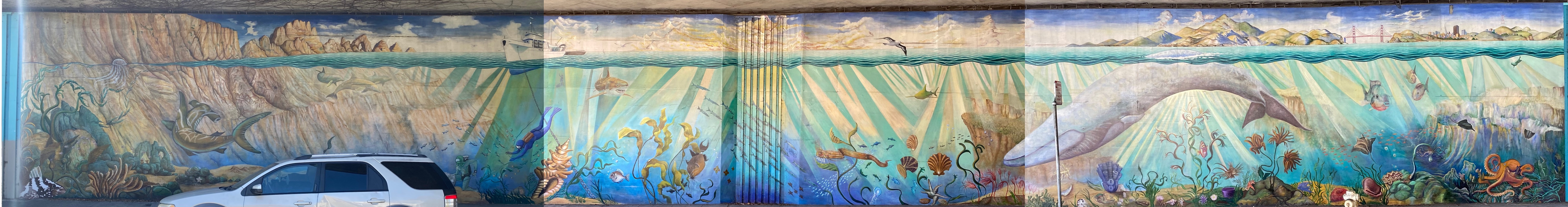

=== Events ===
FROG organizes semi-annual clean-up events on Earth Day in April and a Creek-to-Bay Day in September.

Since 2006, the Temescal Farmers Market takes place on Sunday mornings on the Department of motor vehicles parking lot alongside the park.

== Geography and hydrology ==
External Map
- Temescal watershed map

The park follows a section of the Temescal Creek between the Rockridge and Temescal neighborhoods in Oakland, California.

In the 1960s, with greater urbanization closer to the creek, concerns about flooding from winter rains grew, and a section of the creek from Lake Temescal to Hardy Park in Rockridge was culverted, along with the plans to construct of a section of Highway 24 between the Caldecott Tunnel and downtown Oakland. Subsequently more sections of the creek were undergrounded.

The association Friends of the Temescal Creek was formed and succeeded in designating a three-block-long strip of land above the buried creek for public use at a later time. On this site the Frog Park was later built in the 2000s and it included the restoration of a faux "reconstituted creek" filled by water pumped up intermittently from the culvert below.

== History ==
=== Creek culverting, park development, and creek recreation ===
External video
- Short History of Frog Park, by Theresa Nelson, co-founder of Friends of the Rockridge-Temescal Greenbelt (FROG), 2015 (6:04 minutes)

The Rockridge neighborhood had been built up around 1910-1930, and was densely developed, making for a dearth of green public open spaces.

This scarcity was further increased with the culverting of the Temescal Creek starting in the 1960s, as well as the construction of Highway 24. The association Friends of the Temescal Creek who wanted to preserve the original creek reached a compromise and succeeded in carving out a three-block-long strip of land for future public use, which would evolve to become the Frog Park.

This undergrounding was part of a generalized trend in the San Francisco Bay Area of culverting creeks, as they were seen as a risk to public health due to the garbage flowing in them, as well as a flooding risk. In the 1970s onward the trend began to reverse; interest grew in creeks as valuable natural features. In the 1980s, municipalities in the Bay Area began to enact moratoriums on culverting urban creeks, and public resources began to be devoted to restoring some of them.

An early vision for how to use the space now occupied by the Frog Park came in 1972 when it was proposed that a park be designed centered on a small creek within the right of way by pumping Temescal Creek water to ground level, with trails and other features to be placed alongside it.

First the Hardy Park on its northern stretch and the Redondo Park on its southern edge were built. However most of the strip in-between, mostly owned by the Alameda County Flood Control District, was left unused and fenced-off with overgrown weeds on it.

In the mid-1990's a group of parents feeling the need for a park for children in the lower Rockridge area began to search for possible places to build a child-friendly park closer to the neighborhood. Their sense of lack of open spaces was validated by a citywide survey which identified Rockridge, Temescal, and the Fruitvale neighborhoods as the three areas most lacking in open space.

This group of parents first gained experience in the renovation of the nearby Colby Park in 1995. That park was small and designed for children under 5 years old, so this group sought to create another space that would also be suitable for children both younger and older.

After much deliberation and research by the group, volunteers Peter Hollingsworth and Tom Dolan outlined a masterplan that envisioned the construction of playgrounds to anchor either end of the linear park; one for toddlers and one for older children. The idea gained traction, the group formed the association that would become the Friends of the Rockridge-Temescal Greenbelt (FROG). FROG began campaigning in 1998 to build the park; they led a coalition of volunteers, gained the support of the city government, as well as the support of multiple land owners including the California Department of Transportation and the Alameda County Flood Control District. (Note: Further details (not included in this article) about the community organizing and deliberation process can be found in: Nelson, Theresa (November 7, 1998). "DMV to Stay on Claremont; Park Still Alive". The Rockridge News. Vol. 13, no. 10 (140). p. 1.; "DMV Plans". The Rockridge News. December 5, 1998. p. 3.; Bogart, Michael (February 6, 1999). "The Case Against a DMV Park". The Rockridge News. Vol. 14, no. 2. p. 7.; Lerner, Raissa; Hollingsworth, Peter (February 6, 1999). "The Case for a DMV Children's Park". The Rockridge News. Vol. 14 (143), no. 2. p. 1.; RCPC [Rockridge Community Planning Council] Board of Directors (May 8, 1999). "Let's Create a Wonderful Park for Rockridge and Tesmescal Neighbors - On April 8, the RCPC Board of Directors voted unanimously to build a park at the Department of Motor Vehicle site on Clarement". The Rockridge News. p. 3.; Hollingworth, Peter (June 5, 1999). "Park Efforts Center on Creek - A linear park along Temescal Creek may be the ideal solution for the Rockrdige park proposal". The Rockridge News. Vol. 14, no. 6.; "Council Votes Rockridge Park Funds". The Rockridge News. Vol. 14, no. 7. July 10, 1999. p. 1.; Carol McClellen, RCPC Parks Committee Co-Chair (October 2, 1999). "Planning Begins for a Rockridge Park". The Rockridge News. p. 4.; Fitzhugh, Sally (January 6, 2001). "Rockridge Park Development Funding at a Critical Juncture". The Rockridge News. Vol. 16, no. 1 (164). p. 1.: "Put Your Mark on The Park - There's Still Time to Volunteer". The Rockridge News. October 6, 2001. p. 4.)

The project received public funds from numerous public sources. Further, and making the project more unique, organizers decided to save money by building the two playgrounds themselves to save on construction costs. Total funding for the first phase of construction amounted to about $1.4 million. Volunteers raised cash and in-kind donations to fund building the two play structures.

Ithaca (NY)-based Leathers and Associates, which specializes in custom-designed playground plans and community construction, was hired to guide the project.

Groundbreaking happened in late 2001, and about 1,300 volunteers worked over a ten-day period to build two large play structures in the parks. Eileen Fitz-Faulkner who organized the labor for the project called it "a modern version of a barn-raising." The first phase was completed in 2002. It consisted of building two playgrounds (The Big Frog park for children 12 and under at the northern edge, and the Little Frog park for aged 5 and under at the southern edge), the restoration of the Oceanus mural under the highway, and improved access to the Temescal Creek.

In 2006 FROG pursued a second phase of development of the park, resulting in the addition of new amenities and the completion of the link between the two parks at the edges with a paved pathway built and a creek channel cleaned and landscaped. This was followed by two more phases adding and modernizing amenities in 2012 and 2019. As of 2014 the investments in the park were reported to total $2.8 million.

=== Civic society involvement ===
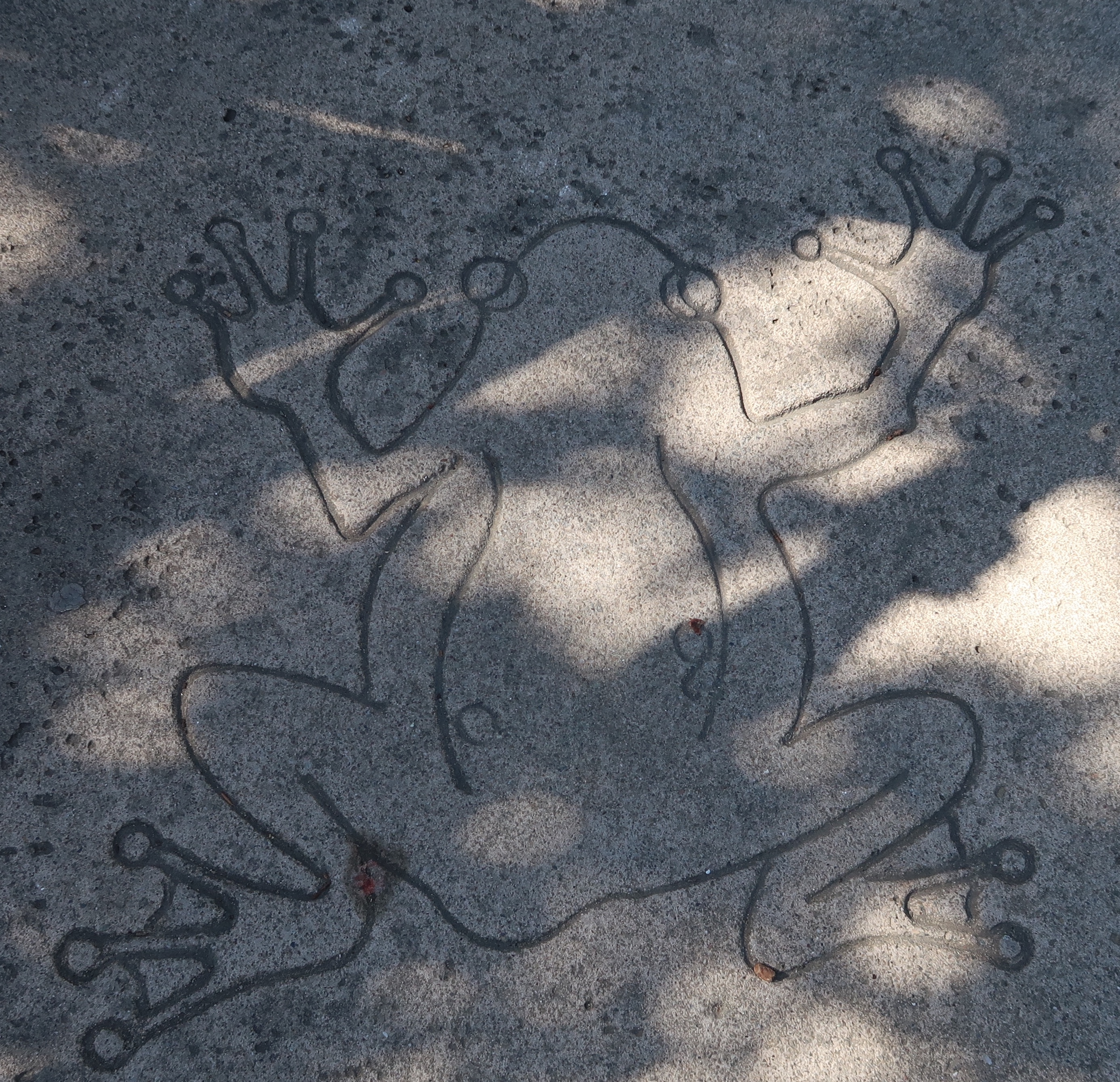
Multiple engraved drawings of frogs along the pathway of the park are representative of the ethos of the park as well as one of its two official names, which, following the Temescal Creek, draws inspiration in the amphibious life that had populated it.

The park is supported by a coalition of local leaders and organizations including among others the Friends of the Rockridge-Temescal Greenbelt (FROG), Oakland Parks and Recreation Foundation, Temescal Neighbors Together, Friends of Temescal Creek, DMV Neighbors Association (DNA). The administration of public funds for the development and maintenance of the park was first facilitated by the Friends of Oakland Parks and Recreation (FOPR), and later by the Oakland Parks and Recreation Foundation.

According to FROG co-founder Theresa Nelson, the first chair of the association was Steve Costa, followed by Jennifer Cooper, Therese Nelson, Carol Behr, and Alison Drury & Will Sheldon as co-chairs beginning in 2020.

FROG has continued to work in sustaining community involvement, with significant maintenance of the park done by neighbors.

=== Names ===
The park has two official names: the Rockridge-Temescal Greenbelt, and Frog Park. The park has also been known as the Greenbelt, the Rockridge/Temescal Park, Temescal Creek Park, or sometimes the Creekside Greenbelt Park. It encompasses two older and smaller parks: the Hardy Park and Redondo Park, later also known as Big Frog and Little Frog respectively.

The community group that championed the creation of the larger park initially called themselves Friends of the Rockridge/Temescal Park and also FOG as an acronym for Friends of the Greenbelt. With the design they were envisioning in the 2000s including the revival of the Temescal creek, and inspired by the amphibious ecosystem it represented, someone proposed that their acronym be modified to FROG, and that the name of the association be adapted to fit it: Friends of the Rockridge/Temescal Greenbelt. The name Frog Park was popularly adopted and a few years later the City of Oakland also officially recognized it.

== Image gallery ==
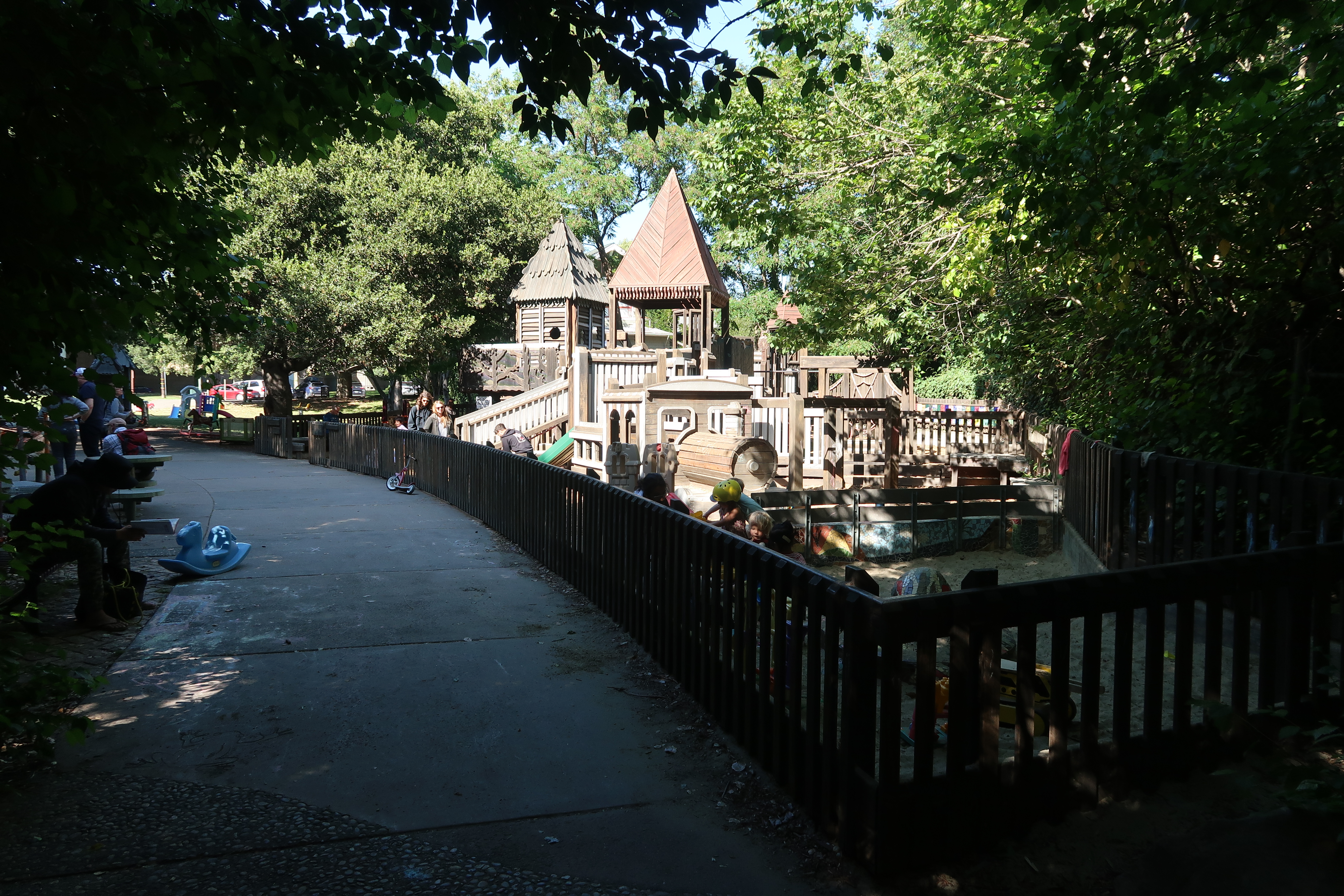
Big Frog Park play structure

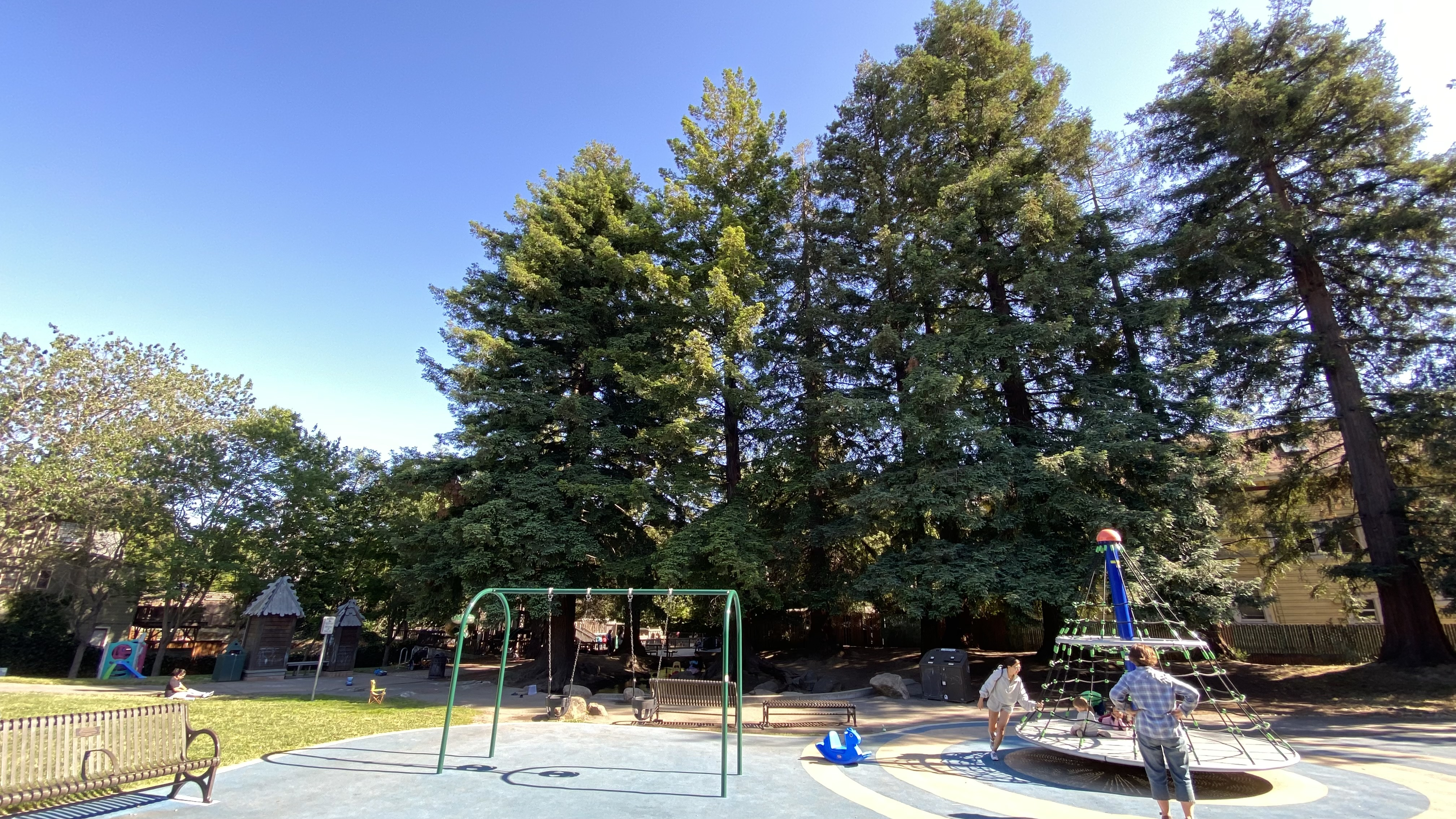
Big Frog Park swings

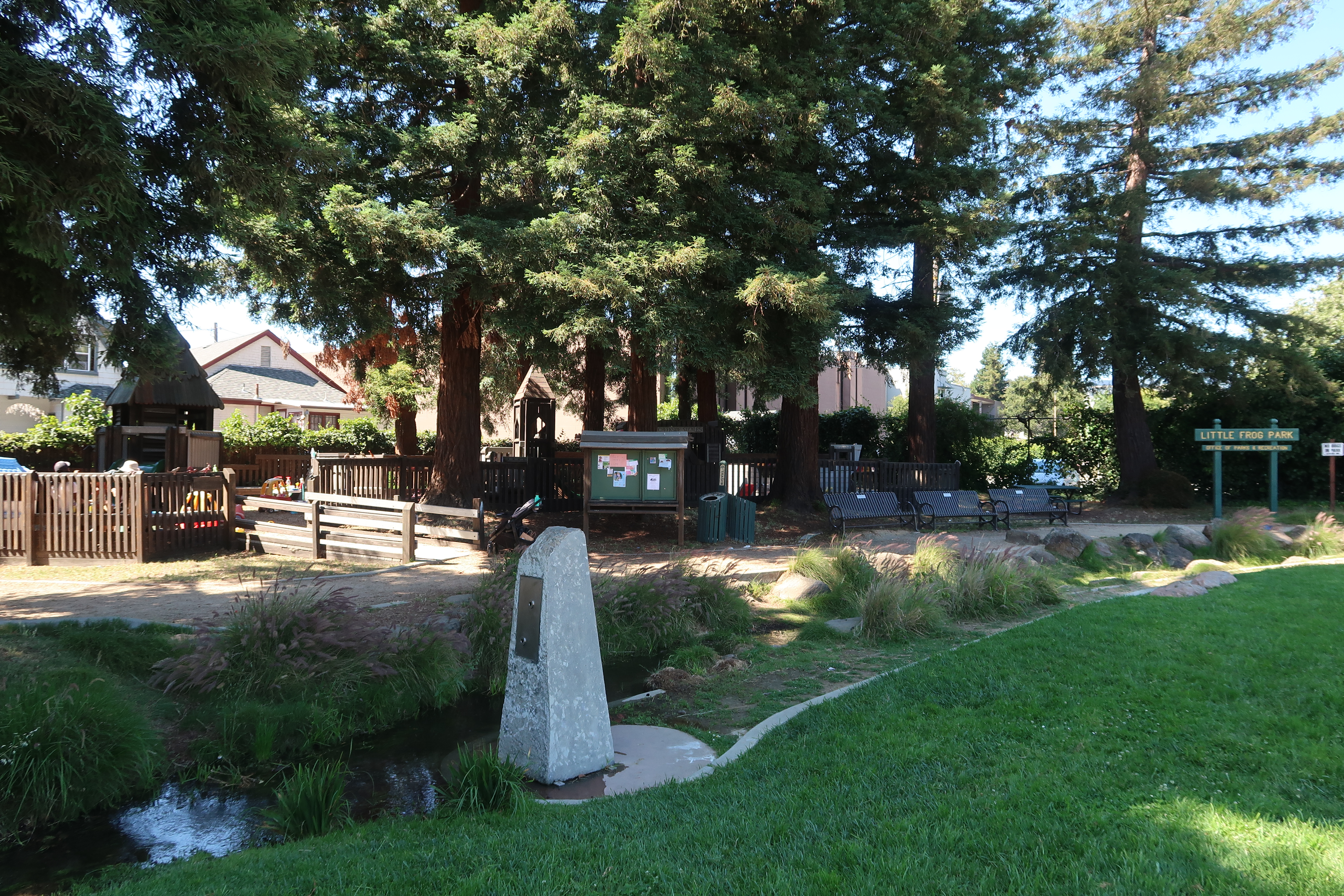
Little Frog Park

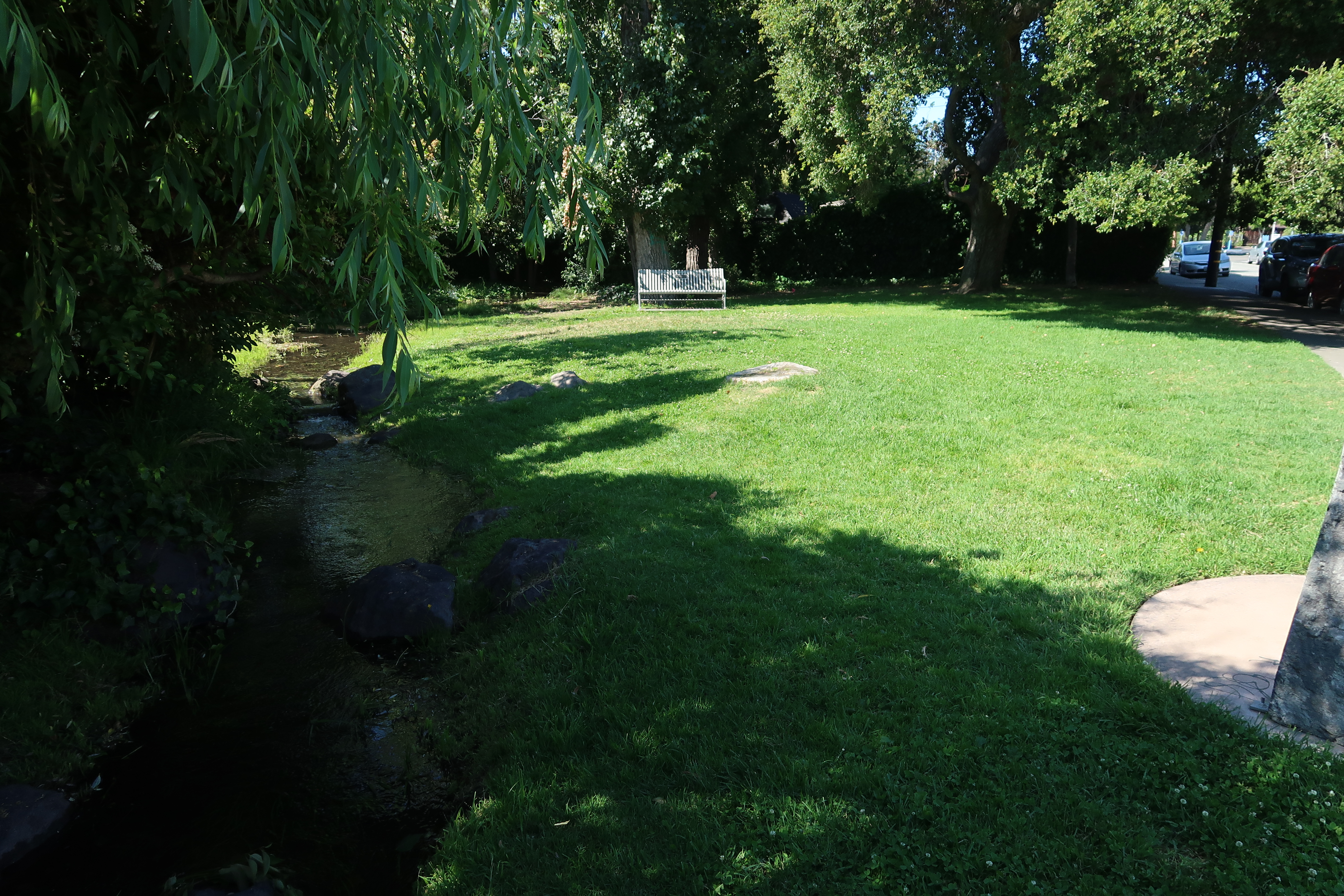
Greenbelt

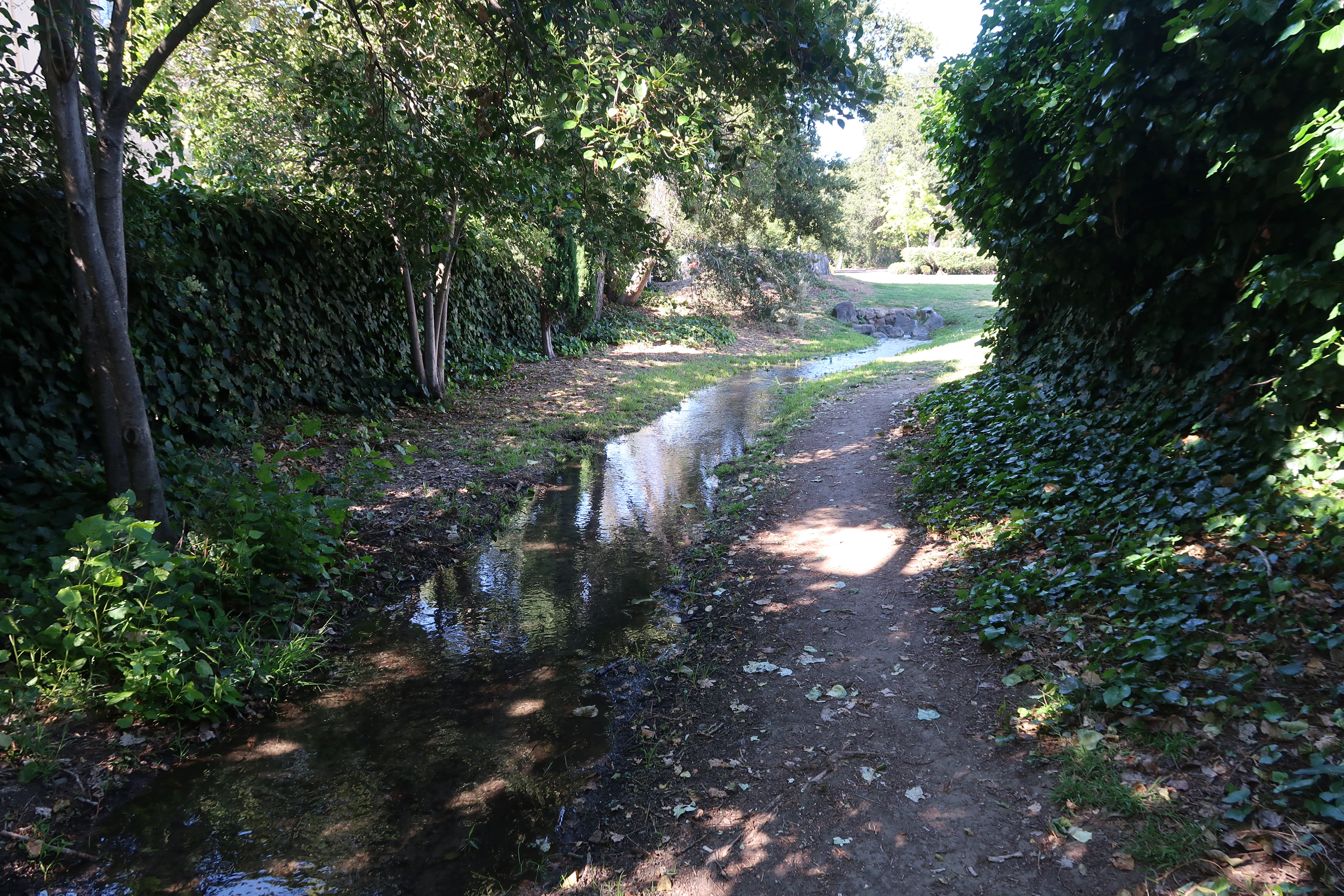
Greenbelt creek

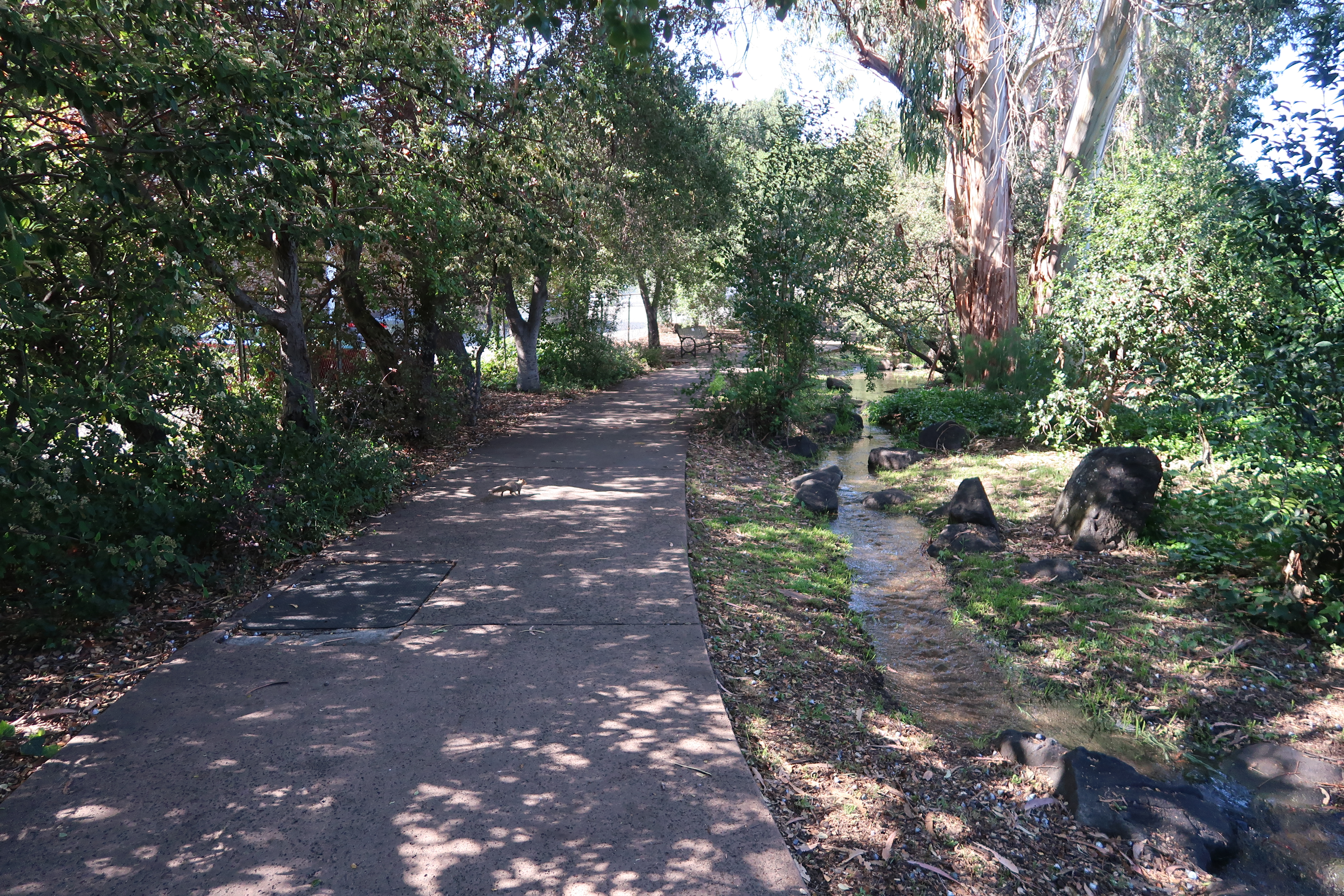
Greenbelt paved path

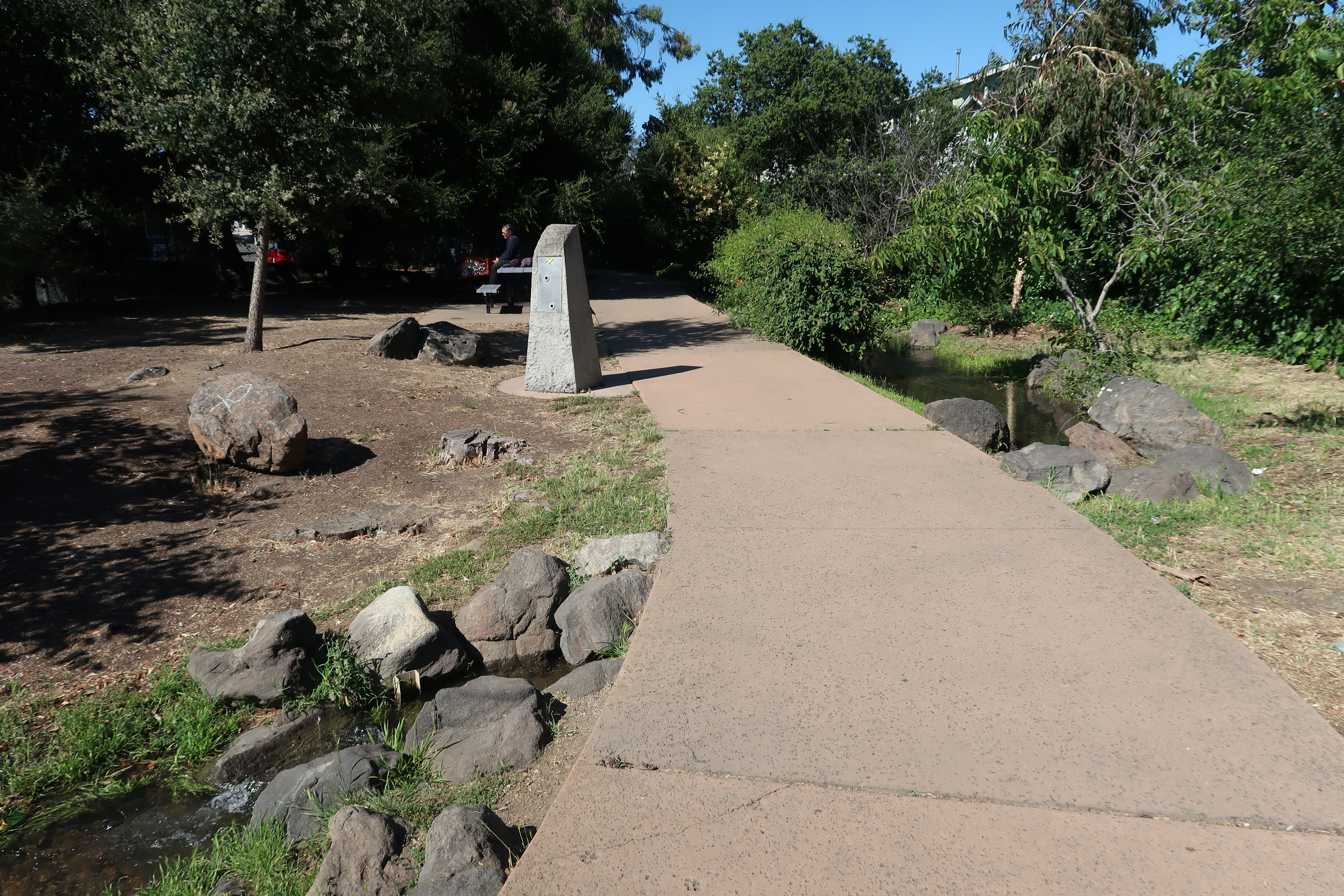
Greenbelt paved path

== See also ==
- List of parks in Oakland, California
- East Bay Regional Park District
