= Between the Tides =

Digital history project of San Francisco Bay

Part of Stanford University’s Spatial History Project, headed by Richard White (historian), Between the Tides is a digital history project that seeks to show how the San Francisco Bay and its shoreline have changed over time by overlaying seemingly disparate data sets. More generally, because of the bay’s “twin character as both urban and natural,” this project aims to provide insights into the complicated and constantly changing relationship between society and nature.

== Matthew Booker ==
Between the Tides' principal investigator is Matthew Booker, a visiting assistant professor from North Carolina State University whose work focuses on the relationship between humans and nature in the coastal regions of North America. He earned his doctorate from Stanford University in 2005; his dissertation was titled “Real Estate to Refuge: Transforming San Francisco Bay’s Tidal Wetlands, 1846-1972.” He began this digital project in the spring of 2008. As the preeminent environmental historian in the Southeast, Dr. Booker brings years of experience and knowledge to the project.

== Layers of History ==
The project examines three “seemingly unrelated transformations” of the bay with the “hope that overlapping these layers of history will allow us to see and analyze patterns of environmental and cultural change in this particular space between the tides.” The first layer consists of a visualization of Indian uses of the land. The second layer is a record of the attempt, still ongoing, to transform the region into a commercial center. The third and final layer demonstrates the changing nature of waste management in the area.

== Visualizations ==
Between the Tides currently contains six visualizations: (1) Morgan Oyster Holdings, 1909: Height of Bay Oyster Industry; (2) San Mateo County Bay Ownership 1877–1927; (3) Visualizing Sea Level Rise and Early Bay Habitation, 6000 B.P. to Present: The Emeryville Shellmound; (4) Rising seas flood a river valley and create San Francisco Bay; (5) Morgan's Bay Holdings, 1930; and (6) Shell Mounds in San Francisco Bay Area.
