= Bay Street Emeryville =

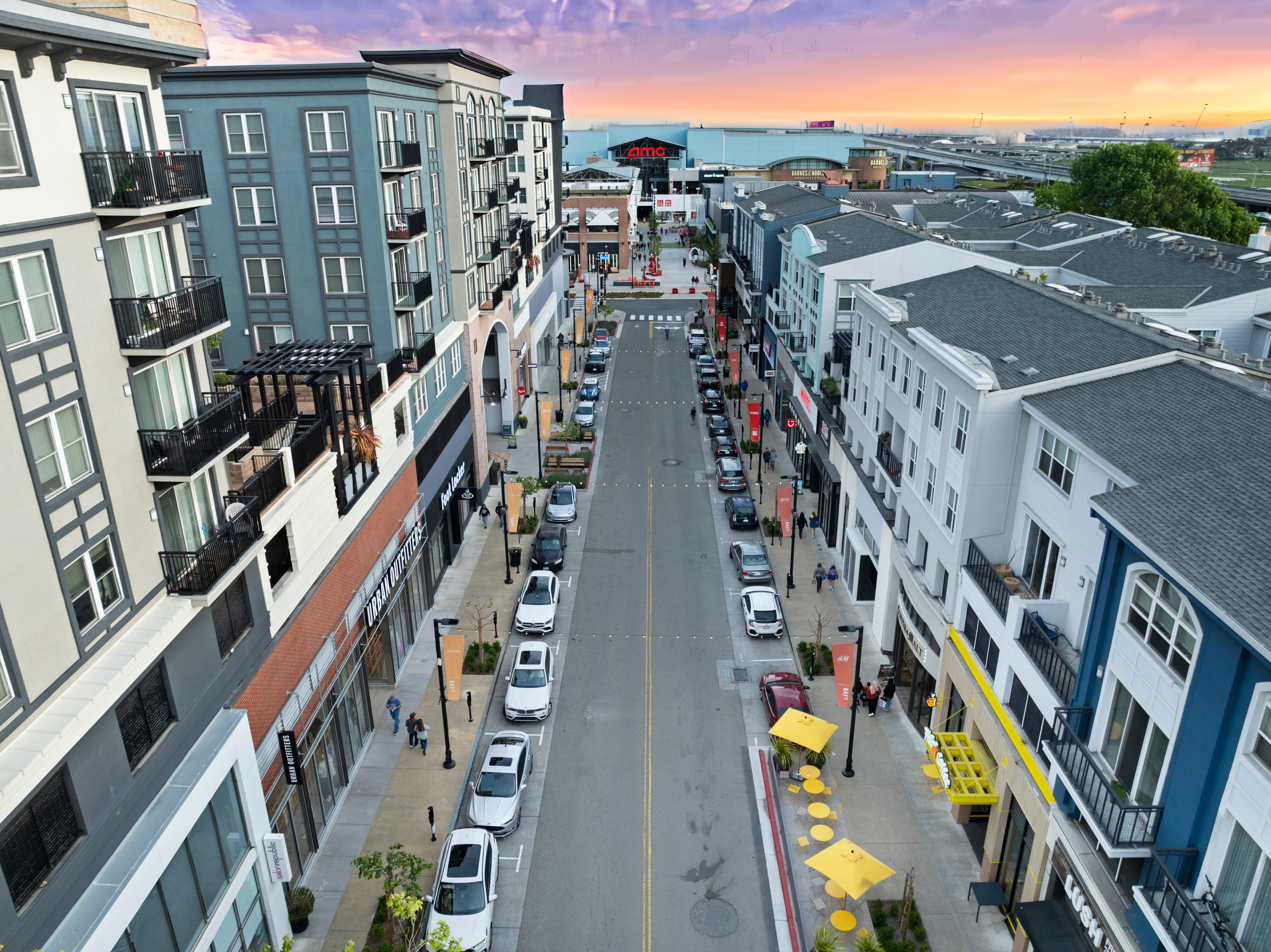
- View of Bay Street Emeryville with Oakland in the distance
- Location: Emeryville, California, United States
- Coordinates: 37.8353°N 122.2922°W
- Address: 5616 Bay Street
- Opened: November 13, 2002
- Manager: CenterCal Properties, LLC
- Owner: CenterCal Properties, LLC
- Num. of stores: 76
- Floor area: 400,000 square feet (37,000 m^{2})
- Floors: 3
- Parking: 2,000 spaces
- Website: https://baystreetemeryville.com/

Bay Street Emeryville is a large mixed-use development in Emeryville, California which currently has 65 stores, ten restaurants, a sixteen-screen movie theater, 230 room hotel, and 400 residential units with 1,000 residents.

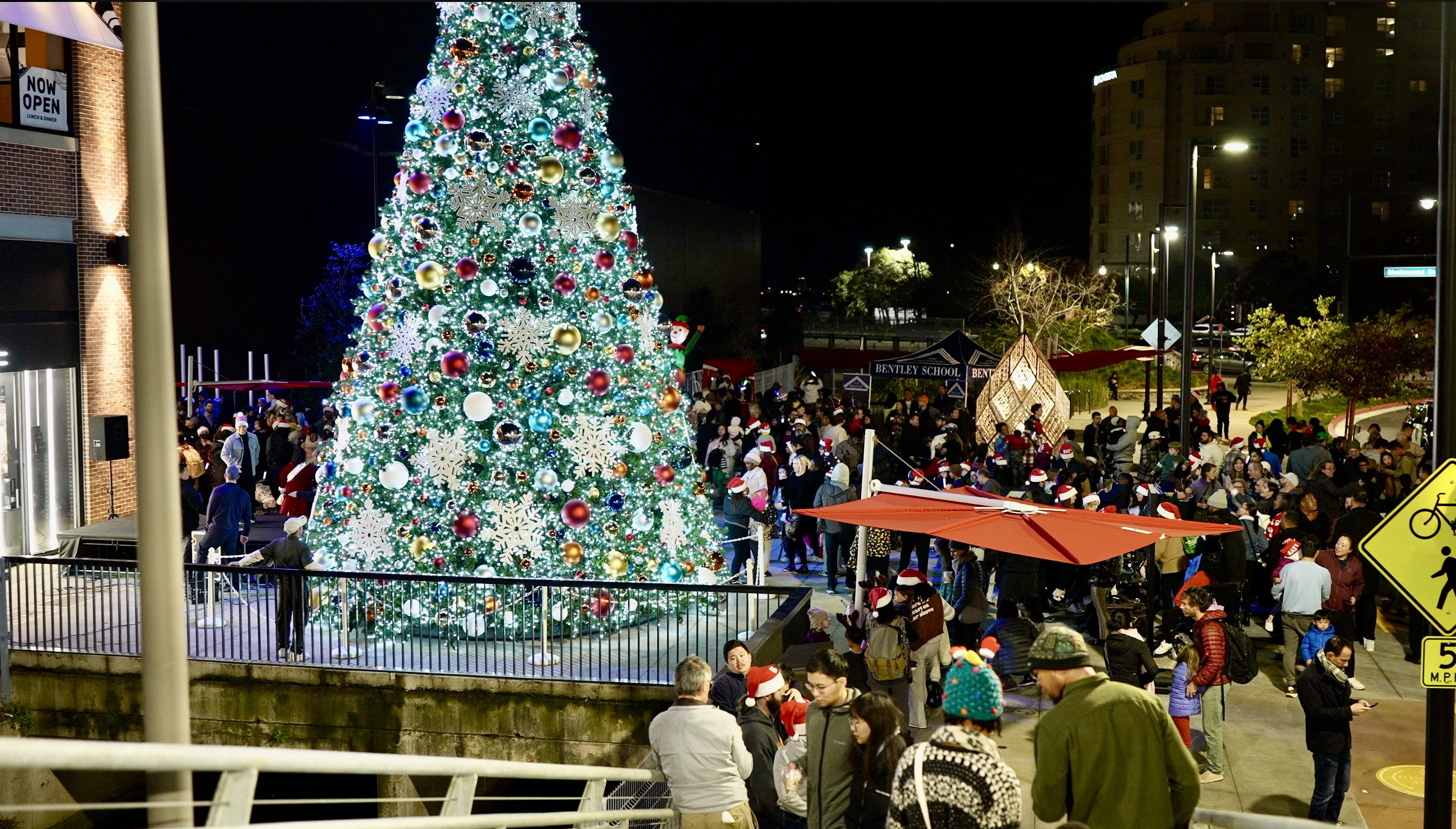
Tree Lighting Event, 2024

== Surroundings ==
It is near several hotels, an IKEA store, Pixar, and three other shopping centers: East Bay Bridge Shopping Center, Emeryville Marketplace, and Powell Street Plaza. The mall was built on the site of the Emeryville Shellmound.

Temescal Creek runs spring water and Emeryville urban through the property in a channelized open culvert with concrete lining to the confluence with the bay at the Crescent wetlands. It is adjacent to Interstates 80 and 580 in addition to the Oakland-San Francisco Bay Bridge and the MacArthur Maze. It is across from the Emeryville Crescent State Marine Reserve.

== History ==
The mall has the only LEED certified West Elm that also provides some of its own solar energy, with a grass roof to provide habitat for insects, and substantial use of sky lights to reduce energy use.

The mall is built on an Ohlone Indian burial ground and shellmound and former toxic waste site. Since 2001 there has been a "don't buy anything day" hosted at the site by descendants of the Ohlones that believe the site has desecrated the resting place of their ancestors.

In 2010 the mall began to attract tourists to a 34-foot-tall (10 m) Christmas tree made out of 84 shopping carts. The unique tree created by artist Anthony Schmitt originated from Santa Monica, California, where it was displayed every winter season until 2014. New general management took over in 2017.

In 2021 Bay Street Emeryville was sold by UBS Realty Investors and acquired by CentreCal Properties based in Southern California.

== Stores ==
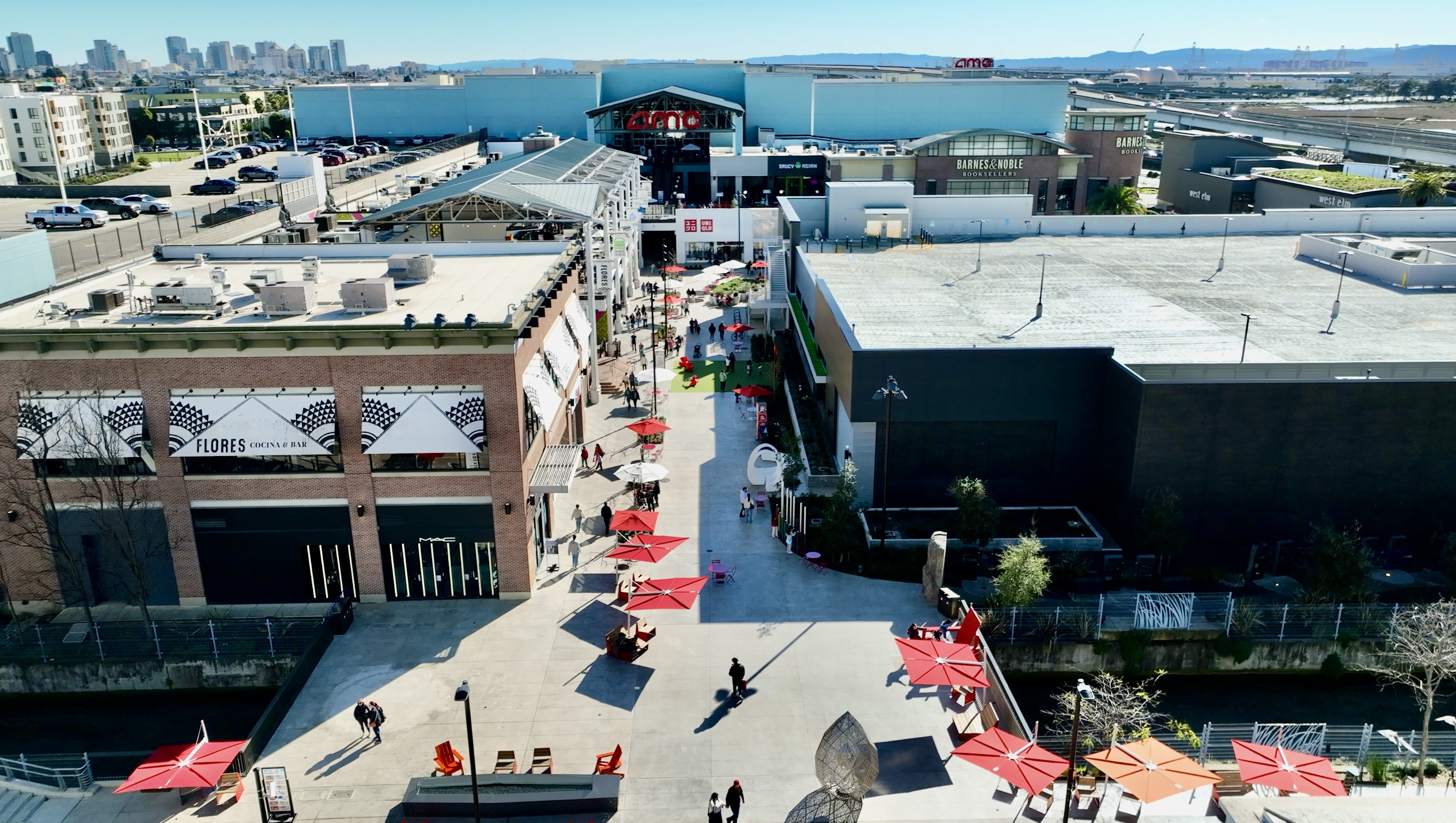
Redesigned Plaza as of 2023

Bay Street features a mix of upscale and traditional mall retailers, with a two-level Barnes & Noble bookstore, flagship West Elm and Apple stores.

== Transportation access ==
The mall has public transport access by AC Transit local bus line 36 between the West Oakland BART station and the University of California, Berkeley, furthermore transbay commuter routes C, F, J to the San Francisco Transbay Terminal and Z reverse commute from San Francisco to Emeryville. the Emeryville Amtrak Station, and free Emery Go-Round shuttles on the Shellmound/Powell line to MacArthur BART station and other areas in the city. Parking, originally free, now costs US$2–10 depending on the length of stay. The fees have been controversial, as they have been consistently raised over the years.
