= Toronto Region Research Alliance =

Canadian development organization

- Founded: 2005
- Dissolved: 2012
- Type: Economic Development
- Purpose: Investment Attraction, Research Capacity Building, Public Awareness
- Location: MaRS Building, Toronto, Ontario, Canada
- Origins: Toronto City Summit Alliance
- Region served: Durham, Halton, Hamilton, Peel, Toronto, Waterloo, Wellington, York
- Key people: Patrick Draper, President and CEO
- Website: http://www.trra.ca

The Toronto Region Research Alliance (TRRA) was a regional economic development organization promoting increased investment in research and innovation to further economic prosperity. TRRA was a public-private partnership supported by the governments of Ontario and Canada, and a wide range of regional stakeholders from the private sector, universities, colleges, and research hospitals.

TRRA focused on retaining and growing foreign companies into the Toronto region. The organization focused on life sciences, information and communication technology, materials science and Clean tech.

== History ==
TRRA was conceived in June 2003 as a result of the civic consensus achieved through the Toronto City Summit Alliance (TCSA). TCSA represents over 40 civic leaders from the private, labour, voluntary and public sectors in the Toronto region. This unique group came together in 2002 to assess our urban region's strengths and challenges and shape a framework for action that could move the region forward over the next five to 10 years. TCSA released its report, Enough Talk: An Action Plan for the Toronto Region, in April 2003. This report included a recommendation to form TRRA.

== Toronto Region ==
The Toronto Region Innovation Zone consists of key innovation clusters in a broad geographic area anchored by the City of Toronto, and includes the surrounding regions of Durham, Guelph, Halton, Hamilton, Peel, York, Waterloo and Wellington.

The Toronto Region has a population of about 7.4 million (including over 200 ethnic groups and 180 languages) and a GDP over $300 billion. It has 9 universities, 8 colleges and 12 research hospitals. It also houses a skilled labor force, with 64% of workers aged 25–64 holds a post-secondary degree or equivalent.
