= Lake Temescal =

Lake in California, USA

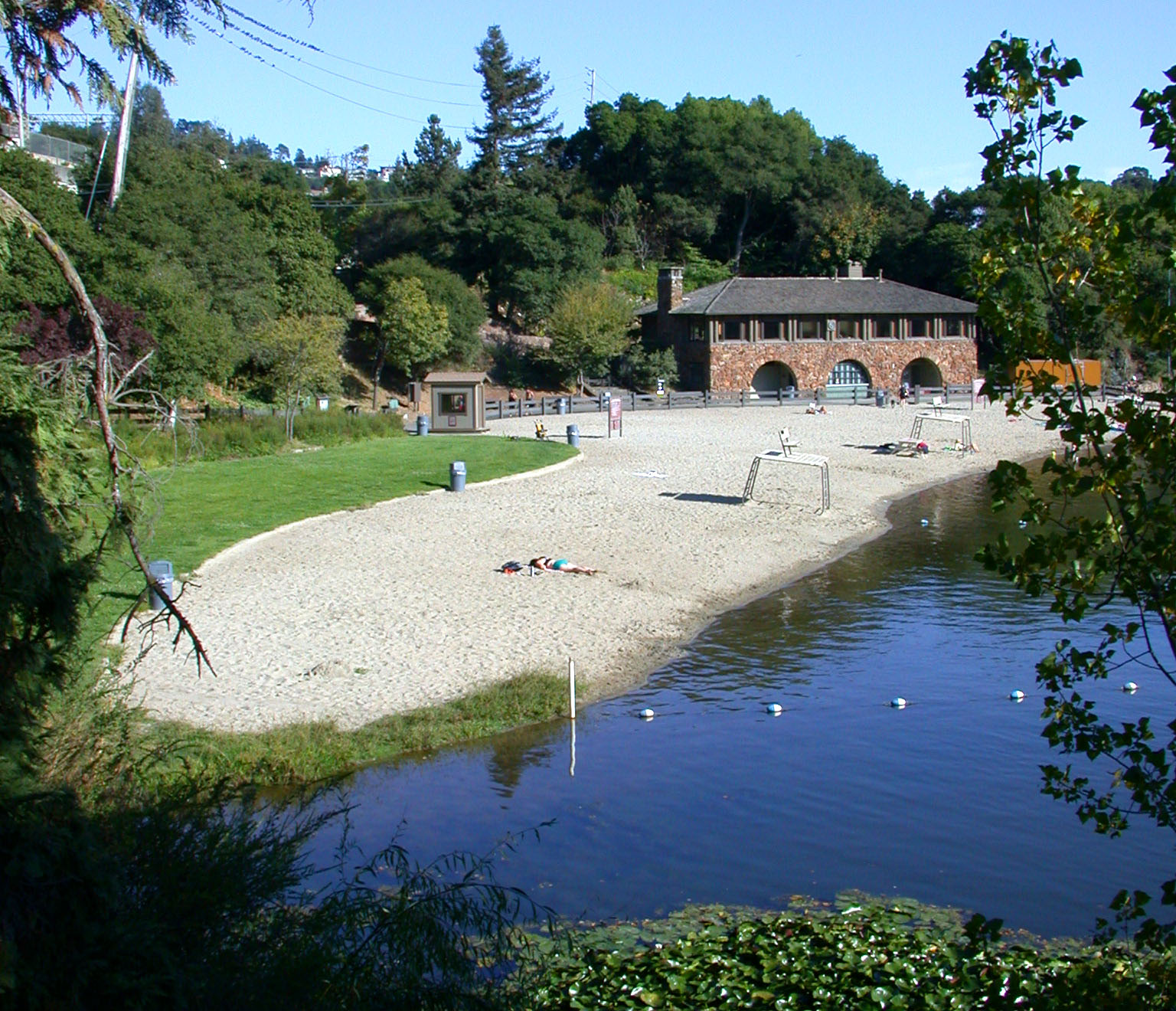

- Location within California Location within the United States
- Location: Oakland, California
- Coordinates: 37°50′52″N 122°13′53″W
- Type: Reservoir
- Primary inflows: Temescal Creek
- Primary outflows: Temescal Creek
- Basin countries: United States
- Max. depth: 20 ft (6.1 m)
- Surface elevation: 433 ft (132 m)

Lake Temescal is a small reservoir in the Oakland hills, in northeastern Oakland, California. It is the centerpiece of Temescal Regional Recreational Area, also known as Temescal Regional Park (and originally, Lake Temescal Regional Park). It is a part of the East Bay Regional Park District.

== History ==
The lake received its name from the stream which is its source, Temescal Creek, which was dammed in 1868 to create a reservoir to provide drinking water for the greater East Bay area, pumped by the Contra Costa Water Company, owned by Anthony Chabot. Prior to being dammed, Lake Temescal was a sag pond, a depression caused by the Hayward Fault. The bulk of the manual labor of removing soil and digging to bedrock was provided by Chinese immigrants, who probably immigrated to build the railroads. Herds of wild mustangs were used to compact the tons of dirt that were brought to create the dam. The dam is 600 feet (180 m) long and 16 feet (4.9 m) wide and rises 105 feet (32 m) above the creek.

The shores of the lake were a popular camping spot with bohemian artists and writers in the late 1800s. The British painter J.H.E. Partington lived here in a tent with his family when they arrived in Oakland in 1889. At a campout here in the summer of 1892, Partington's son Richard Partington and the future poet and playwright George Sterling were introduced by Carleton Bierce to Carleton's uncle Ambrose Bierce, who became Sterling's mentor, changing his life.

Pacific Gas and Electric constructed its Claremont substation directly above Lake Temescal starting in October of 1921. It opened on October 23, 1922 and remains in service to this day.

During the first half of the 20th century, the tracks of the Sacramento Northern Railroad ran along the eastern side of the lake.

Until the mid 1930s, Lake Temescal extended northeastward into Temescal Canyon. This arm of the lake was traversed by a trestle for the Sacramento Northern railway until the inlet was filled in as part of the Broadway Tunnel (Caldecott Tunnel) project. As part of the project, Landvale Road was extended as a connecting viaduct with Mountain Boulevard and the Montclair District to the south. This required the construction of a large concrete retaining wall along the east side of Lake Temescal to support the fill. The railroad trestle was removed and the Sacramento Northern tracks re-laid just below it. Landvale Avenue ran above the wall to an intersection with the new extension of Broadway leading to the tunnel. The retaining wall survives, but the railroad was gone by 1957. Landvale was replaced by the Warren Freeway and Broadway by the Grove-Shafter Freeway in the late 1960s.

In 1936, Lake Temescal opened to the public as one of the first three parks established by the East Bay Regional Park District. Its early amenities included a beach-like shore for swimming, a boathouse built by the WPA, a well established trail around the lake, and numerous picnic benches.

== Present-day function ==
The lake currently supports an artificial recreational beach and is stocked periodically with rainbow trout, largemouth bass, redear sunfish, bluegill, and catfish. The park is open to all visitors from 5 am to 10 pm, and receives around 200,000 visitors a year.

The California Office of Environmental Health Hazard Assessment (OEHHA) has developed a safe eating advisory for Lake Temescal based on levels of mercury or PCBs found in fish caught from this water body.

The lake is constantly becoming shallower due to sediment runoff and must be periodically dredged. Today it is approximately 20 feet (6.1 m) at its deepest point; previously it was 80 feet (24 m) deep.

Since the dam crosses the Hayward Fault, there is a possibility of dam failure in the event of an earthquake, which would cause serious flooding in parts of Oakland, Berkeley, and Emeryville. However, due to the additional fill placed between the dam and Highway 24, any hydraulic failure is now unlikely.

During the 1991 Oakland firestorm, water-equipped helicopters refilled at Lake Temescal, largely draining it.

The beach house is available for event rentals, such as weddings.

The park's beach and swim area have periodically closed on and off due to an outbreaks of toxic blue-green algae that is hazardous to humans and pets.

== See also ==
- List of lakes in the San Francisco Bay Area
- Index: East Bay Regional Park District
