= Temescal Regional Recreational Area =

Regional park in Oakland, California, U.S.

Coordinates: 37°50′52″N 122°13′53″W

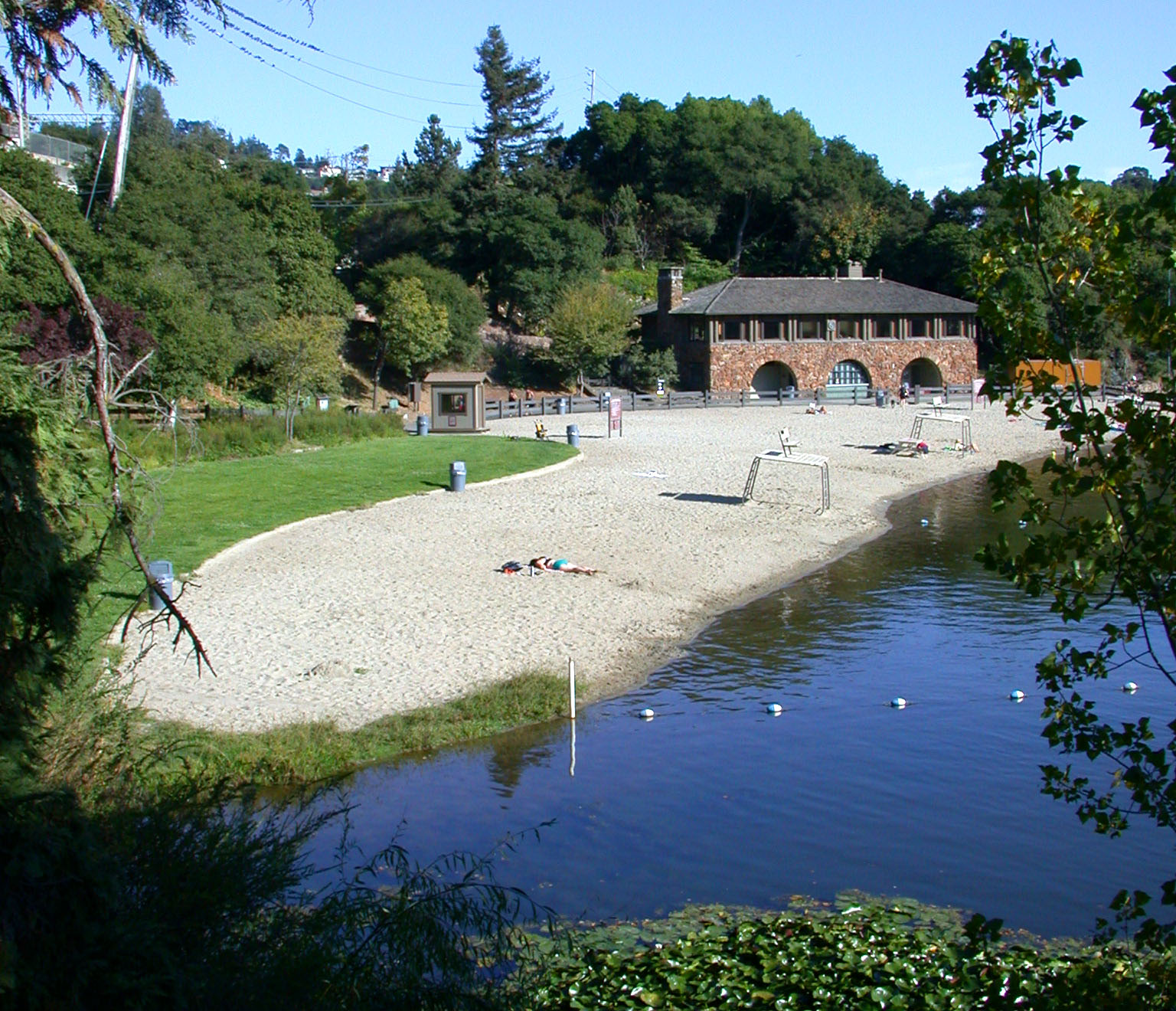
- Lake Temescal and Beach House in Temescal Regional Recreation Area. Image date September 17, 2006
- Interactive map of Temescal Regional Recreational Area
- Nearest city: Oakland, California
- Area: 48 acres (19 ha)
- Created: 1936
- Operator: East Bay Regional Park District

Temescal Regional Recreation Area (TRRA), formerly Lake Temescal Regional Park, is a regional park in the Berkeley Hills, in northeastern Oakland, California. The TRRA encompasses 48 acres (19 ha), abutting SR 24, SR13, and the interchange connecting the two highways, southwest of the Caldecott Tunnel.The park is part of the East Bay Regional Park District (EBRPD).

== History of the lake ==
Lake Temescal was created in 1869, after Anthony Chabot won a contract to supply the town of Oakland, California with drinking water. Chabot had already become notable by developing a method of extracting gold from the Sierra Nevada mountains with high-pressure water cannons. He decided to use the same technique to construct a reservoir by blasting the walls above Temescal Creek, and recovering the dirt and rocks to build an earthen dam across the creek. Chabot had already formed the Contra Costa Water Company to pump water from the proposed reservoir to the Oakland water system.

By 1875, Oakland's population had grown to about 25,000 from about 10,000 when the dam was first completed. It was obvious that Lake Temescal was too small to remain the primary source of the city's water, so Chabot's company moved farther south to construct a much larger reservoir, later named Lake Chabot in Castro Valley. Temescal became only a secondary source.

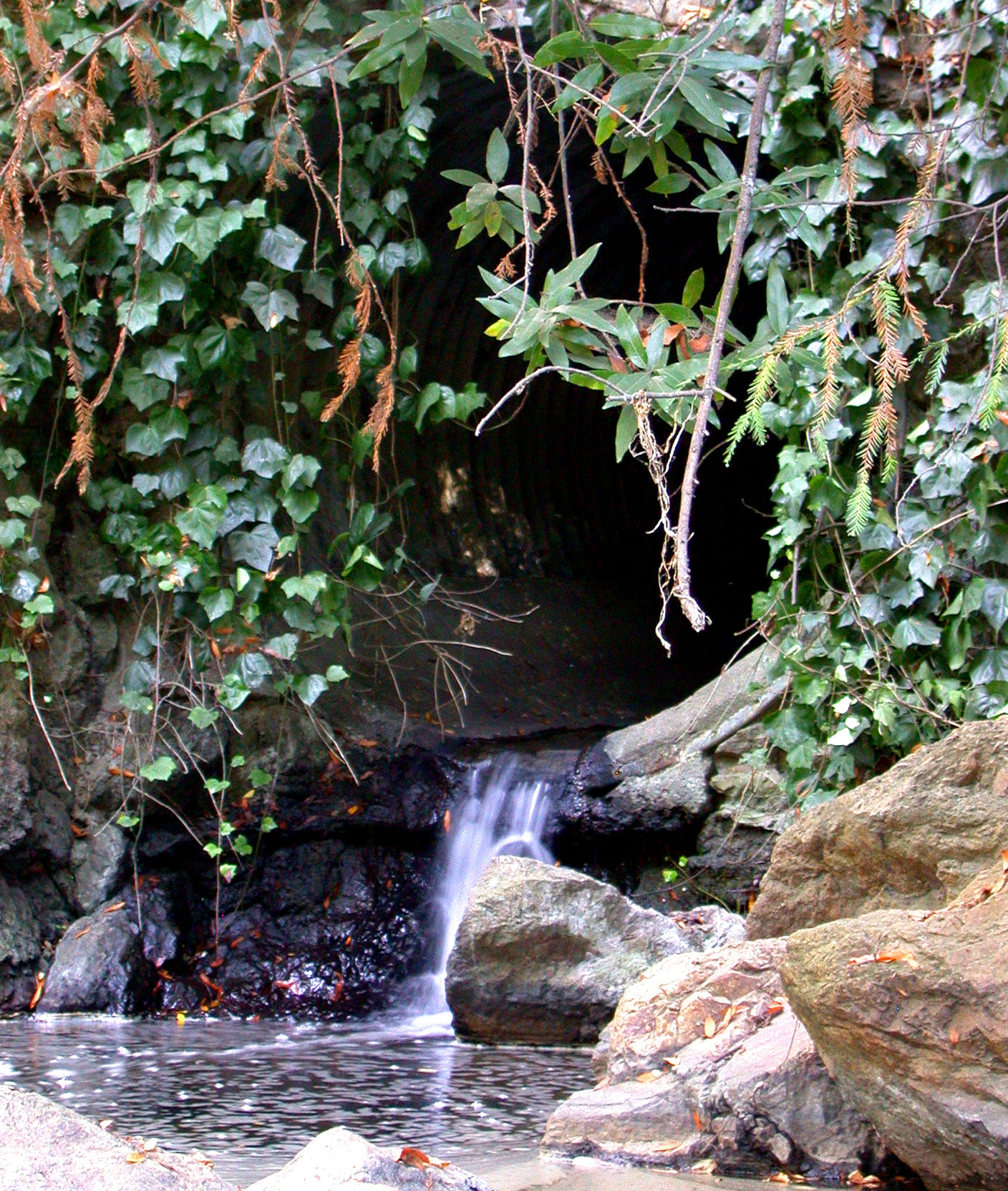
Temescal Creek in Temescal Regional Recreation Area, September 18, 2006

Lake Temescal is the main attraction in the park, which also offers trails, picnic areas, forest habitats, and bird watching. The lake was originally constructed as a drinking water reservoir for the city of Oakland. It was one of the first three parks opened to the public in 1936 by the East Bay Regional Park District (EBRPD).

== Beach House ==
In 1940, workers supplied by the Civilian Conservation Corps (CCC) constructed an imposing building overlooking the lake. The two-level building, which has since been known as Beach House, can be rented for private events, such as group meetings, receptions and dinners.

== See also ==
- Lake Chabot
- Lake Temescal
