= Temescal Creek (Northern California) =

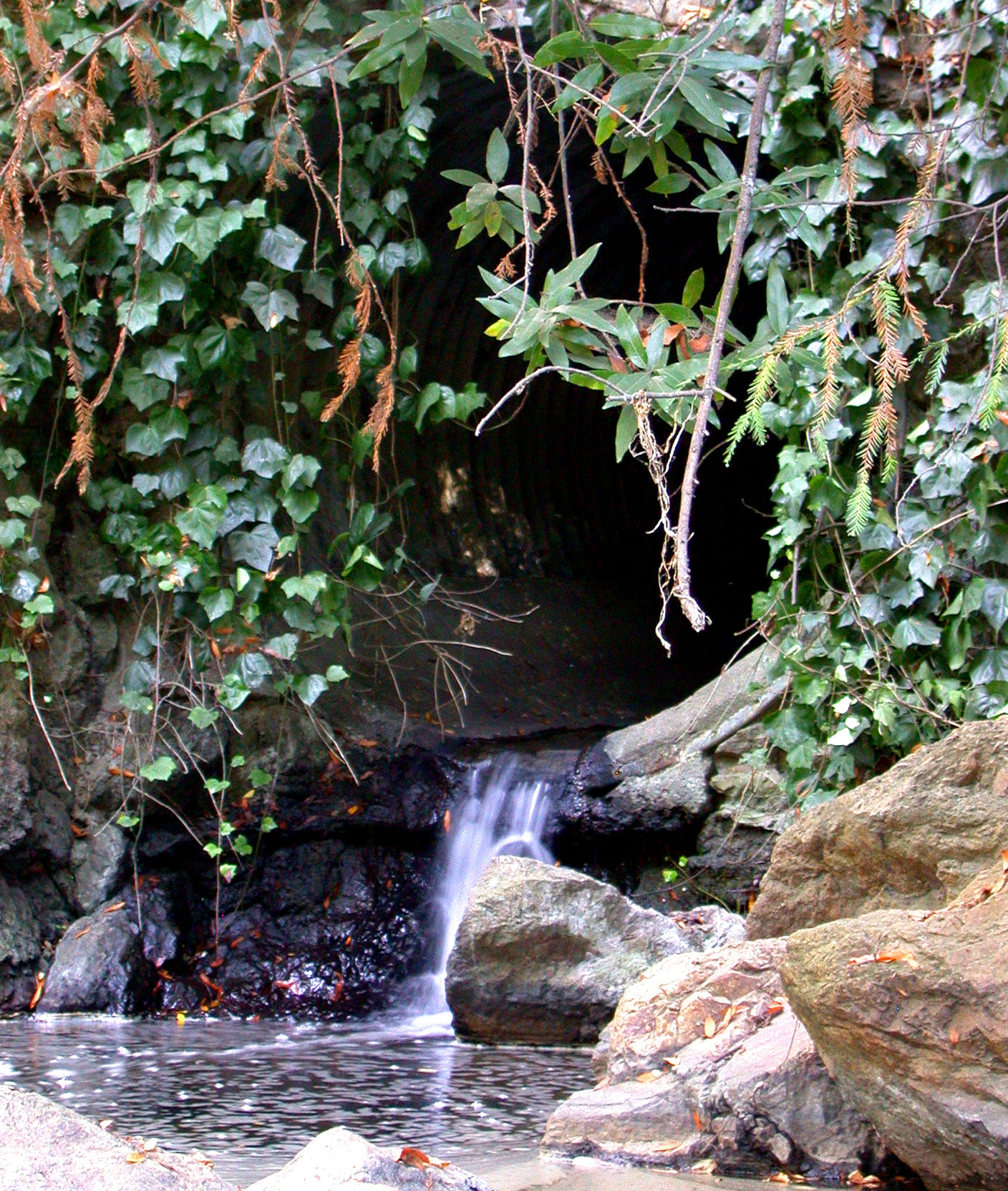
- Temescal Creek as it comes aboveground at Temescal Regional Park

Location
- Country: United States
- State: California
- Counties: Alameda County
- City: Oakland

Physical characteristics
- Source
  - location: Montclair District, Alameda County, California
  - coordinates: 37°50′34″N 122°12′09″W
- Mouth: culvert toward San Francisco Bay
  - location: Oakland, Alameda County, California
  - coordinates: 37°50′2″N 122°17′42″W

Temescal Creek (Temescal, Mexican Spanish for "sweat lodge") is one of the principal watercourses in the city of Oakland, California, United States.

The word "temescal" is derived from temescalli/temazcalli (variously transliterated), which means "sweat house" in the Nahuatl language of Mexico. The name was given to the creek when it became part of the Peralta's Rancho San Antonio. It is surmised that the Peraltas or perhaps one of their ranch hands (vaqueros) had seen local indigenous (Ohlone) structures along the creek similar to those in other parts of New Spain which were called temescalli or "temazcalli".

Three forks begin in the Berkeley Hills in the northeastern section of Oakland (also referred to as the Oakland hills south of the Caldecott Tunnel), part of the Pacific Coast Ranges, coming together in the Temescal district of Oakland, then flowing westerly across Oakland and Emeryville to San Francisco Bay.

The north fork of Temescal Creek was renamed "Harwood's Creek" in the mid 19th century after an early claimant to grazing lands in the canyon above the Claremont neighborhood, retired sea captain and Oakland wharfinger William Harwood. It was renamed yet again "Claremont Creek" in the early 20th century after a residential development in the same vicinity, today's Claremont district.

The middle fork flows through Temescal Canyon mostly in underground culverts, beneath the Grove Shafter Freeway starting near the Caldecott Tunnel and underneath the interchange with State Route 13. It joins the south fork at Lake Temescal. Before the Caldecott tunnel project (1934–37), this fork entered the lake via a prominent inlet that was traversed by a trestle bridge of the Sacramento Northern Railroad. The inlet was filled in and the trestle replaced by a large concrete embankment which exists to this day.

The south fork begins in the northern section of Oakland's Montclair district, flowing southwest out of a canyon in the hills alongside Thornhill Road, then turning abruptly northwestward in the linear valley formed by the Hayward Fault. It then flows into Lake Temescal, a natural sag pond which was dammed in the 19th century to increase its capacity for use as a reservoir. Lake Temescal is now a public park.

The creek continues out of the northernmost corner of Lake Temescal into another underground culvert. The tunnel follows the Grove Shafter Freeway and briefly re-emerges next to Saint Albert's Priory next to Presley Way and Miles Avenue. It continues westerly around the end of the shutter ridge in the Rockridge district of Oakland, where it joins the north fork (Claremont Creek) at approximately the intersection of Forest Street and Miles Avenue.

A small section of above-ground creek exists as the Rockridge-Temescal Greenbelt parallel to Claremont Avenue between the Grove Shafter Freeway and Telegraph Avenue. A pumping station at the top of the greenbelt diverts water from the tunnel and pumps it up to the surface creek. After Telegraph Avenue the tunnel continues east underneath the Temescal Community Garden and Temescal Creek Parks, then follows 53rd Street through Emeryville to its mouth at Bay Street.

== Mouth area ==
External Map
- Temescal watershed map

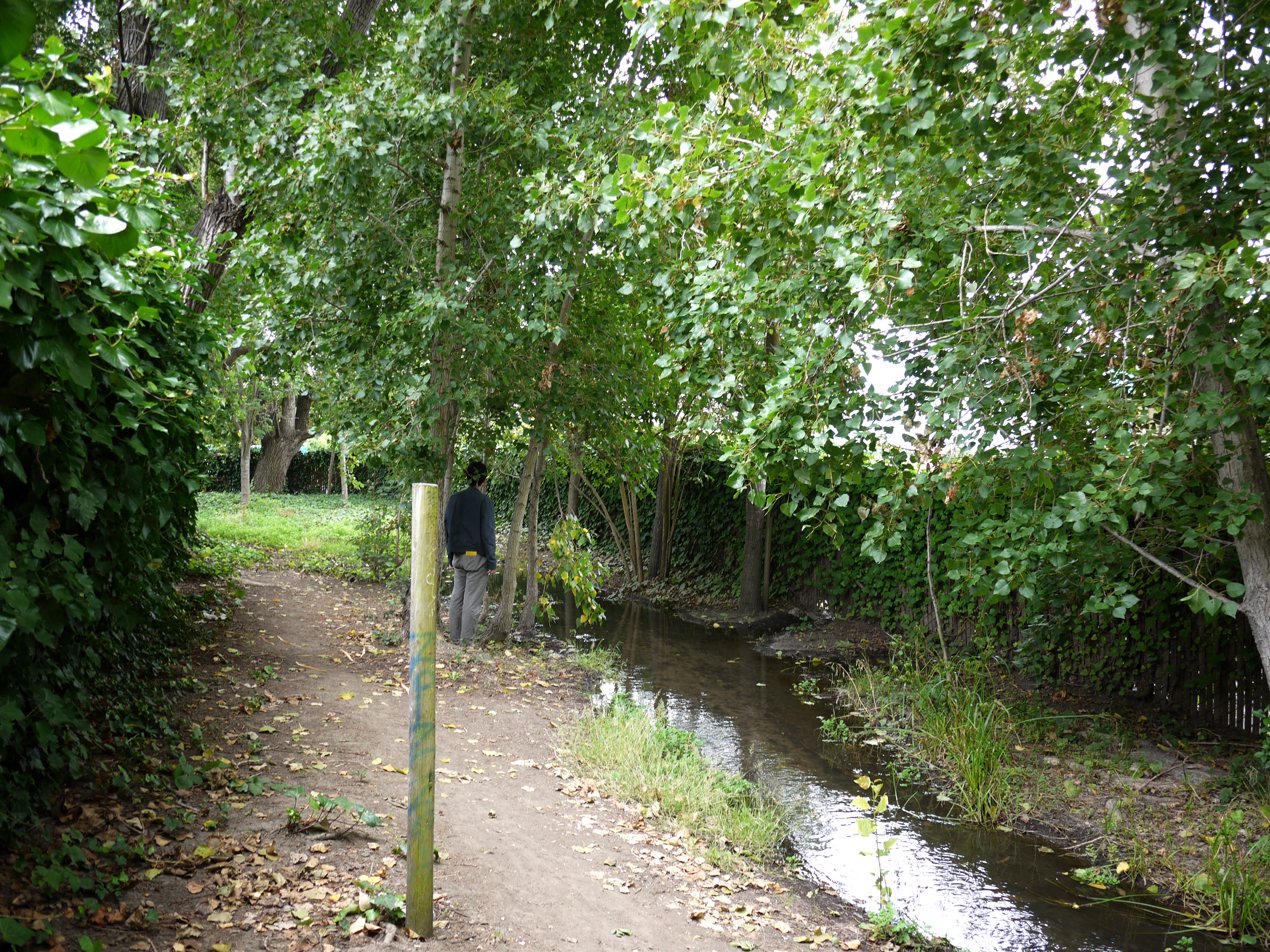
Temescal Creek in Oakland near Cavour Street

Temescal Creek is a perennial stream, and as such, was highly valued by early settlers. At its mouth, the indigenous Ohlone people (Chochen/Huichin band), and their predecessors, built up the shellmound of Emeryville, the largest and most studied shellmound on the shoreline of San Francisco Bay.

When the area was part of the Peralta's Rancho San Antonio, the site near the shellmound was one of the landings for the ranch where their cattle and hides were loaded for shipping. Cattle and other livestock were slaughtered in this vicinity right up through the early 20th century for various meatpacking plants in an area which became known as "Butchertown".

It is believed that Temescal Creek once supported a population of rainbow trout, though urbanization and the damming at Lake Temescal have led to their decline. Archeological evidence indicates that coho salmon were also likely found at one time in the creek. The Emeryville Shellmound is also notable for its remains of beaver (Castor canadensis).

Today, the creek is mostly underground in culverts in the flatlands, but many stretches are open above Lake Temescal. In 2000, a segment of the creek below the tracks of the Union Pacific Railroad in Emeryville became accessible to the public after the demolition of one of the buildings of the historic Sherwin-Williams paint factory in early 2000. Temescal Creek now flows in an open culvert through the 2002 Bay Street Mall development. This is just about the spot where the Emeryville Shellmound once stood. A small informational park commemorating the creek and the Ohlone presence at the site is situated here.

At Shellmound Street, which runs approximately along the original Bay shoreline, the creek returns to a culvert which takes it to San Francisco Bay. This straight course, however, is a later imposition - the original course of the creek bent south and entered the Bay near the northern edge of the IKEA property. Temescal Creek near the mouth area is channelized with concrete linings. The mouth of Temescal Creek at the discharge to San Francisco Bay is fully tidal and consists of mudflats and marshland. Historically both banks of Temescal Creek in the lower area of Emeryville were part of the San Francisco Bay tidal floodplain and were extensively filled from about 1900 through the 1970s. Fill included slag, soil and other inert materials originating from the Judson Steel plant. The Judson plant occupied much of the lower reach banks in Emeryville; Judson used this reach for metal recycling/recovery. Foundations remained of a shear, tin baler, scale, and conveyor as late as 1990 when the lower banks were renamed the "Chiron" site and re-developed.

== See also ==
- Sausal Creek
- Codornices Creek
- Schoolhouse Creek
- Strawberry Creek
