= Splash Pad Park =

Parks in Oakland, California and Phoenix, Arizona

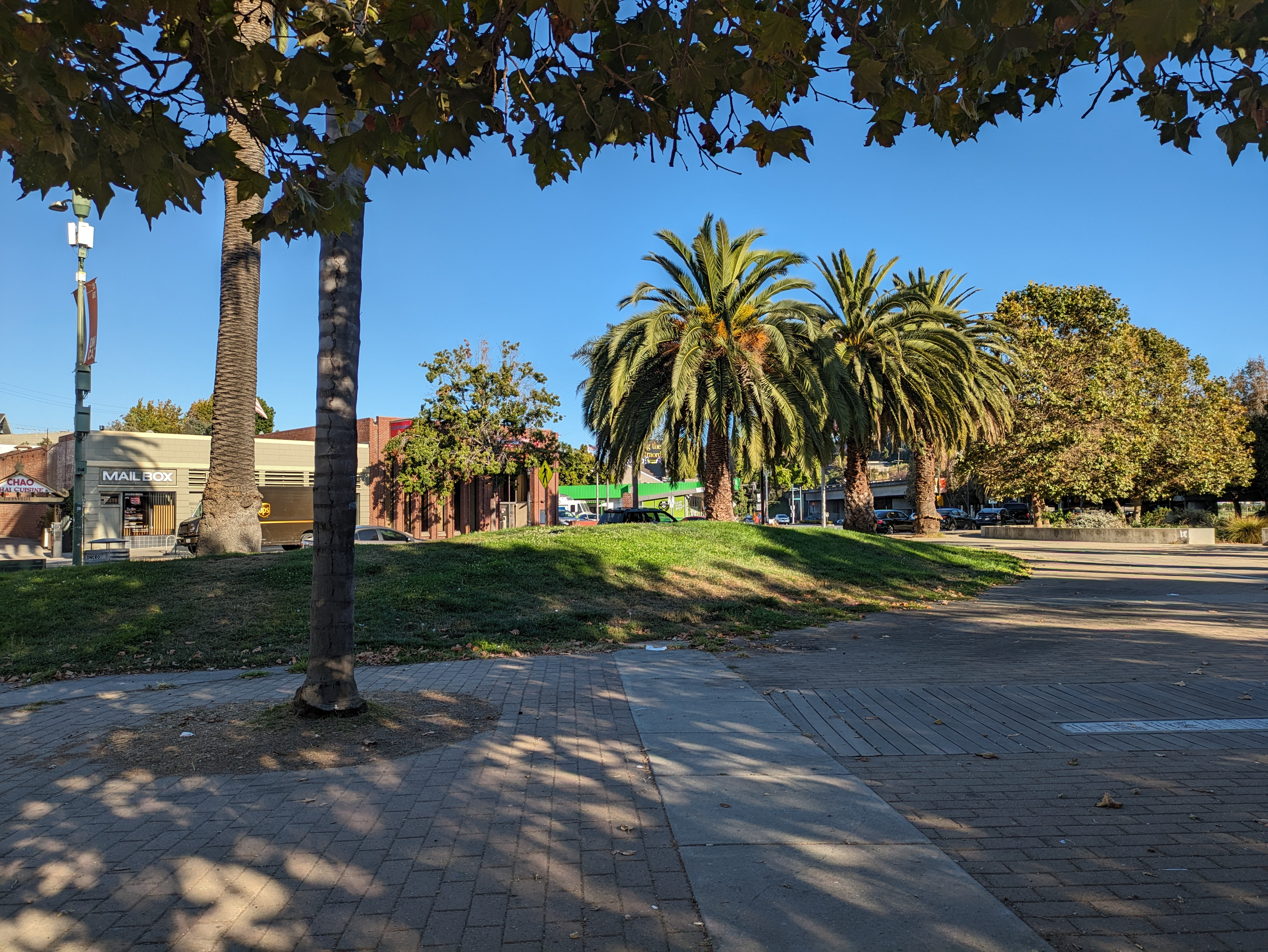
Splash Pad Park in Oakland

Splash Pad Park is the name of several parks containing a splash pad. The original is in Oakland, California, along Lake Park Ave, between Grand Ave and Lakeshore Ave, and north of the 580 Freeway. The Phoenix Zoo also has a Splash Pad Park at its location off Interstate 10 in Arizona between the Loop 101 and the Loop 303.

== History ==
=== Oakland ===
At the end of the 19th century, the park was adjacent to and north of Lake Merritt. The 580 freeway split the park in two in February 1960. Palms and other landscaping were planted around a concrete-lined pond into which water splashed giving the park the name it has since retained. The fountain deteriorated and the surrounding landscaping was neglected. In the late 1990s, the city decided to renovate and rezone the park so that it could serve as a mixed-function area. In July 2000, the Final Report was submitted to the city, and they assigned Hood Design as the landscape design architect. The designer, Walter Hood, "transformed the space into a park that people can actually occupy with flexible spaces that support a variety of uses". The water feature appeared on everyone's list of what to keep when the park was redesigned, as all the park's users enjoyed it. On Saturdays, there is a farmers' market in the park. The park provides a pleasant place to picnic or hang out before an event began elsewhere. The air pollution at the park is elevated due to the vehicle emissions from the freeway and adjacent streets.

=== Phoenix ===
A separate Splash Pad Park was built at the Phoenix Zoo in Arizona. The splash pad helps the customers deal with the heat in the extremely hot summer months. The Phoenix Zoo's splash pad park "Leapin' Lagoon" is included with your paid admission to the Phoenix Zoo. This splash playground is located near the main lake across from the Enchanted Forest. (Note: This splash pad is not operated by the City of Phoenix.) The Phoenix Zoo assigned splash pad and landscape design architects at Raindeck to manufacture and design the Leapin' Lagoon and used custom water park installers to install the custom landscape design.
