= Emeryville Shellmound =

Midden in the United States

Site of Shell Mound
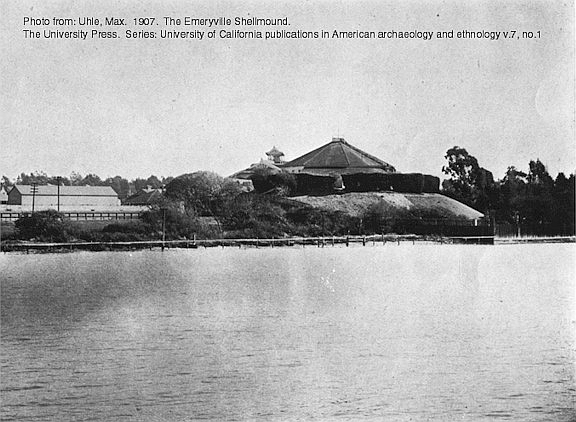
- Shellmound and dance pavilion, in 1902

- Location within Emeryville/the East Bay
- 37.834°N 122.29263°W
- Location: 4600 block of Shell Mound St., Emeryville, California

California Historical Landmark
- Reference no.: 335

The Emeryville Shellmound, in Emeryville, California, is a sacred burial site of the Ohlone people, a once-massive archaeological shell midden deposit (dark, highly organic soil, temple and burial ground containing a high concentration of human food waste remains, including shellfish). It was one of a complex of five or six mounds along the mouth of the perennial Temescal Creek, on the east shore of San Francisco Bay between Oakland and Berkeley. It was the largest of the over 425 shellmounds that surrounded San Francisco Bay. The site of the Shellmound is now a California Historical Landmark (#335).

== History ==
From 800 B.C., groups of Native Americans called the Ohlone lived at this spot by the Bay. The Bay Area region was divided into several dialect-speaking groups, the most advanced society among them called the Chochenyans who resided in the Alameda county region. Emeryville was believed to have been their capital. Originally reported as over 60 feet (18 m) high and some 350 feet (110 m) in diameter, the shellmound constituted a small hill, and was physically linked to several adjacent mounds by extensive lower-lying midden deposits. Its peak likely provided sweeping views of the Bay and the Golden Gate.

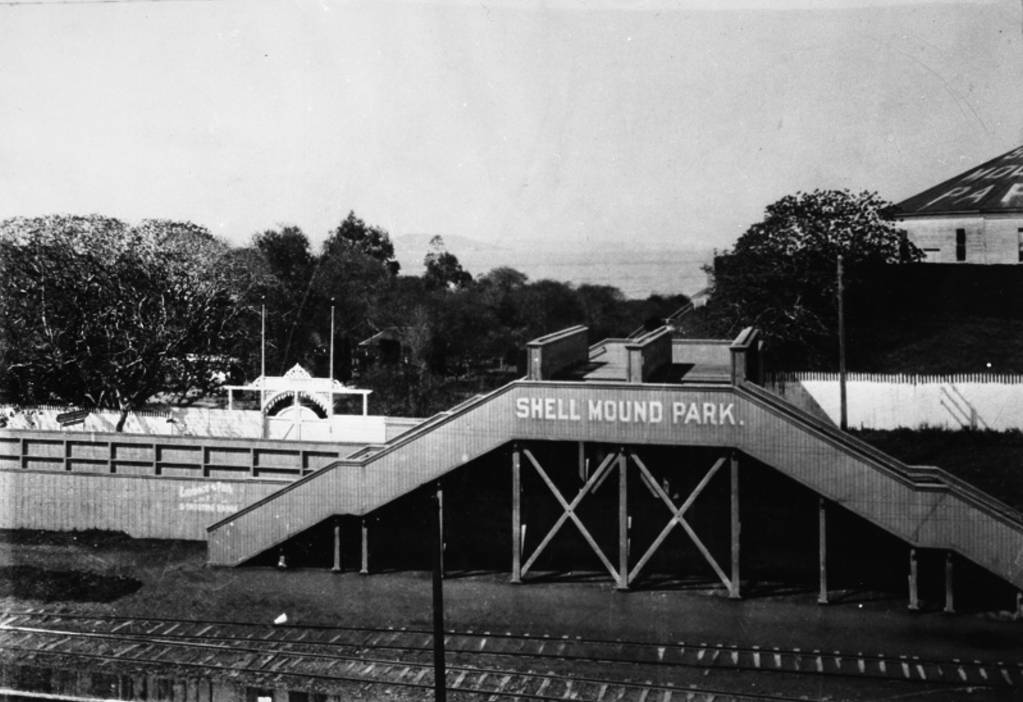
Entrance to Shellmound Amusement Park from Southern Pacific rail stop

Archaeologists believe that Native Americans constructed the Shellmound which was largely made up of shellfish and animal remains, the remnants of millions of meals consumed at the site by the prehistoric residents. The shells they threw aside from their catches of shellfish eventually covered some hundreds of thousands of square feet, marked by several cones. Evidence indicates that the site was a large village, occupied from at least 2800 years ago to 400 years ago. It was also used by Native Americans as a resting-place for their dead. The site was recognized as an archaeological deposit from the time of the first historically recorded settlement of the East Bay, and was subjected to one of the earliest archaeological excavations in the United States. When the University of California excavated this site in 1902, and again in the 1920s, they found that the mound consisted mostly of clam, mussel, and oyster (predominantly Olympia Oyster) shells, with a plentiful mixture of cockleshells.

A large amusement park operated on the site from the 1870s through 1924. The park contained a racetrack, two dance halls, bars, a carousel, bowling alley, and a world class shooting range where national competitions were regularly held. In the early 1900s, the racetrack was also the site of public demonstrations of lighter-than-air and heavier-than-air flying machines. One of the dance pavilions was actually located atop the shellmound, providing a fantastic view of the bay for party-goers. At the time, Shellmound Park was quite an attraction, and was a popular destination for many people from all over the San Francisco Bay Area. With the passage of prohibition in the 1920s, the number of visitors fell off dramatically and the park fell into decline and was sold.

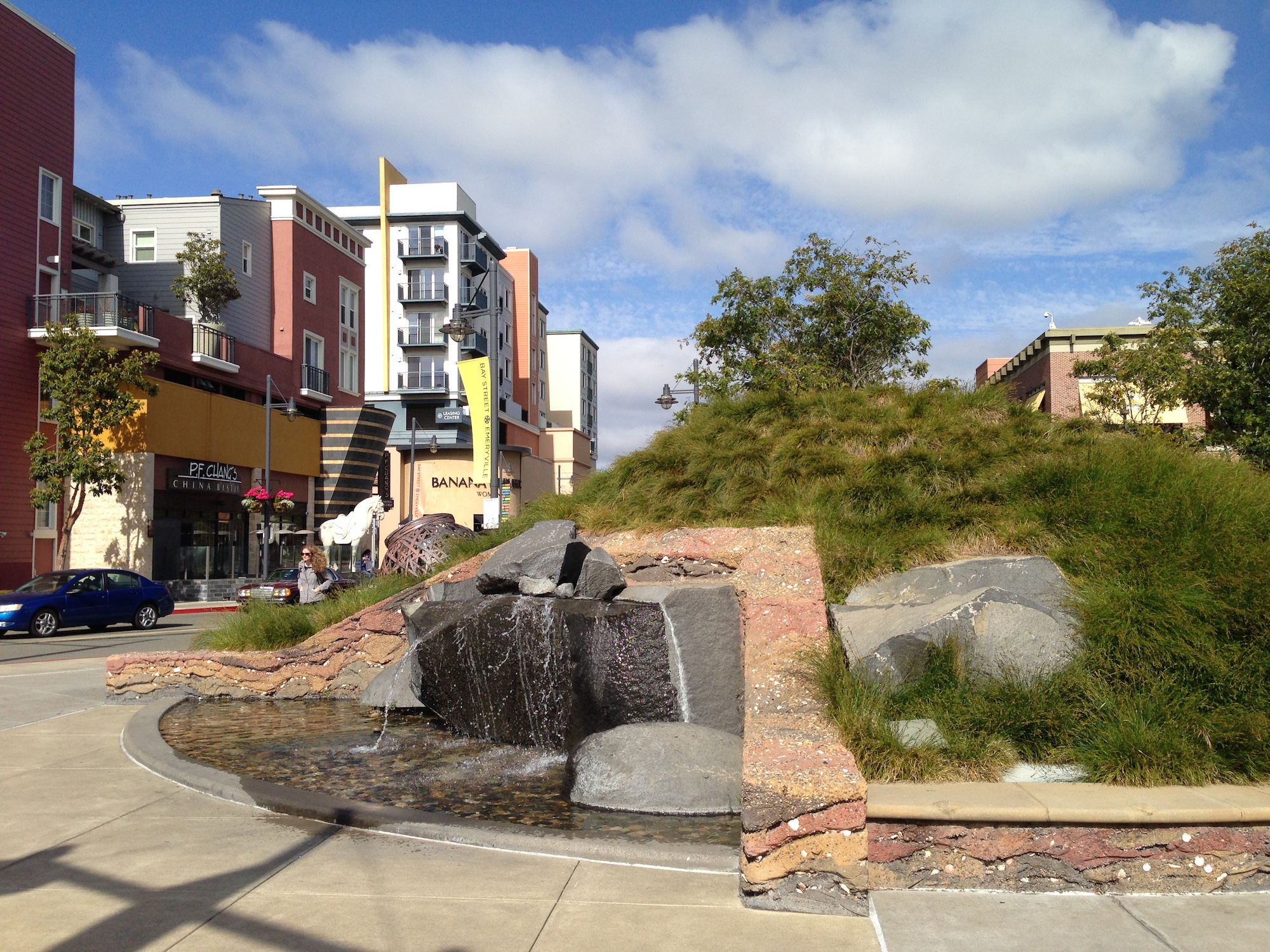
The Emeryville Shellmound Memorial at the Bay Street Shopping Center

The site of the shellmound contained a large industrial plant site from 1924 through 1999, which was demolished by the City of Emeryville Redevelopment Agency in 1999. During the course of demolition, workers at the site rediscovered remnants of the Emeryville Shellmound, a prehistoric Ohlone Indian habitation site, long thought destroyed by the building of the industrial plant in 1924. Despite protest, construction continued, and the artifacts and remains were covered over once again.

Photos of the leveling of the Emeryville Shellmound in 1924 certainly suggest this destruction. However, the small size of construction equipment in the 1920s and the different construction techniques used at that time meant that there was far less destruction of the native ground surface than modern construction methods typically inflict. In fact, the disturbance of underlying soils was far less extensive and complete than might have been expected. In 1999, during the removal of the industrial plant, archaeologists were called to the site and it was determined portions of the Emeryville Shellmound still were intact there. The site is currently occupied by the Bay Street Shopping Center along with a small park in memorial to the shellmound.

== Nineteenth and twentieth century disturbance ==
Beginning in the mid-to-late 19th century, fill material was deposited over and in the vicinity of the Emeryville Shellmound. The purpose of this deposition was to facilitate industrial development of this locale. By the early-to-middle 20th century substantial heavy industry was in place principally in the form of the Judson Steel company manufacturing facility and P.I.E. trucking terminals. These developed uses were atop a layer of fill material measuring three to eight feet in depth above the native soil, shellmound and bay mud; the fill itself derived from construction wastes from San Francisco including debris from the 1906 San Francisco earthquake. Some of the wastes also included waste paints, numerous heavy metals and certain petroleum hydrocarbons.

By the 1980s redevelopment planning for the Emeryville Shellmound vicinity was underway, consisting of planning by private interests and the city of Emeryville. In 1989 Earth Metrics prepared a remedial action plan to assess and remediate soil and groundwater contamination in the vicinity of the Emeryville Shellmound. These studies found elevated concentrations of lead, zinc and certain other heavy metals as well as petroleum hydrocarbons such as benzene and toluene. Most of the contamination was found in the upper fill layers and did not penetrate into the shellmound itself. Substantial amounts of contaminant removal, including many people buried there centuries ago, was conducted prior to area redevelopment. In addition, archeologists found a large number of burials in the piling headings during construction. Many believe that hundreds of burials remain beneath the project that was built.

Opposition to the redevelopment of the moundsite was widespread. It included native people, preservationists, anthropologists and others from the region and around the state. Many articles were written in newspapers, magazines and newsletters supporting the preservation of the shellmound remnants and its designation as a sacred site. Despite this, Emeryville City Council voted to replace the 19 acres (7.7 ha) site with Bay Street Shopping Mall. Bitter feelings remain that the mall should not have been built, that the mitigating memorial to the mound was insignificant, and that the mall was and is an insult to the Ohlone people. On Black Friday (the day after Thanksgiving) each year, native people gather there to protest and inform shoppers about the history and importance of Emeryville Shellmound.

For Shellmound, a 22-minute documentary, filmmaker Andres Cediel interviewed representatives of the city and developers of the shopping mall, archeologists, Ohlone descendants and others.
