= Pacific East Mall =

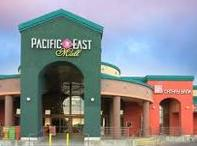
- The main entrance to the mall
- Location: Richmond, California, United States
- Coordinates: 37.89885°N 122.3072°W
- Opened: 1998
- Developer: Pacific Infinity Co. Inc.
- Owner: Regency Centers Corporation
- Num. of stores: 52
- Num. of anchor tenants: 1
- Floors: 2
- Parking: Surface

Pacific East Mall is a shopping mall anchored by an Asian supermarket in Richmond, California. It originally developed by Terry Kwong and Pacific Infinity Company Incorporated, and opened in 1998. In 2015, it was purchased by RREEF for $31 million, and it is currently managed by GD Commercial Real Estate.

== History ==
The mall opened in 1998 in Richmond's Annex neighborhood, directly adjacent to the borders of El Cerrito and Albany, at a former Breuner's location. The commercial center's largest tenant is a 99 Ranch Supermarket, and the rest of the mall is flanked by Asian-owned shops and restaurants. The mall went "through major exterior and interior renovations" in early 2022, increasing the number of food options as part of the shift to attract the increasing Asian demographic in the East Bay.

The mall is located along Pierce Street a frontage road that runs parallel to Interstate 80, near Interstate 580. The nearest major junction is at Central Avenue, allowing access to the two freeways and to San Pablo Avenue. AC Transit line L stops at Pierce Street and Central Avenue, near the mall offering increased convenience.

== Cerrito Creek ==
Cerrito Creek lies adjacent to Pacific East Mall, and runs through a portion of the parking lot. The president of Friends of Five Creeks, a local environmental organization, has criticized the mall management for allegedly allowing herbicide to spread into the creek area, mowing areas containing native plants, and failing to establish a remediation plan.
