= Friends of Baxter Creek =

Community organization in El Cerrito, California

Friends of Baxter Creek is a community organization in El Cerrito, California.

== History ==
The group was created by those passionate about restoring Baxter Creek in El Cerrito and Richmond, California. The group has led to the restoration of various stretches of the creek. The FoGC has also made it that creek restoration is a part of any development effort along the path of this small river. The friends created along with the city of El Cerrito "Baxter Creek Gateway Park" along the Ohlone Greenway and the Richmond Greenway.
