= Stege Marsh =

Wetland area in Richmond, California, US

- Location within California
- Location: Richmond, California in western Contra Costa County, U.S.
- Coordinates: 37.9097°N 122.3303°W
- Designation: Tidal marsh / wetlands

Stege Marsh, also known as the South Richmond Marshes, is a tidal marshland wetlands area in Richmond, California in western Contra Costa County.

== Overview ==
The marsh is the delta at the mouth of Baxter or Stege Creek, which drains from a watershed extending into the Berkeley Hills in El Cerrito. The marsh is opposite Meeker Slough from where Meeker Slough Creek drains into Campus Bay, which is a part of the Richmond Inner Harbor of the San Francisco Bay.

The site was polluted by manufacturing activities at what are now the UC Berkeley Richmond Field Station and Campus Bay, formerly a Stauffer Chemical and most recently a Zeneca sulfuric acid manufacturing center. Restoration is underway. The marsh is so polluted that the San Francisco Bay Area Regional Water Quality Control Board named it a "toxic hot spot" and one of the "top 10 most polluted" sites in the Bay Area in 1998. The contamination includes dangerous levels of toxic chemicals and organic compounds such as arsenic, mercury, and PCBs.
