= AUSD =

AUSD may refer to:

- Alameda Unified School District
- Albany Unified School District, in Albany, California
- Alhambra Unified School District
- Arcadia Unified School District
- Azusa Unified School District
- Australian dollar
