= University of California Pavement Research Center =

US research center

Coordinates: 38.5341424°N 121.7945866°W

The University of California Pavement Research Center (UCPRC) is a research center for the study of pavements. It is located at the University of California, Davis campus in Davis, California, with additional facilities at the University of California, Berkeley Richmond Field Station, in Richmond, California. They perform research in all areas of pavement engineering including materials, construction, design, management, life cycle cost and environmental life cycle assessment. The UCPRC is funded through public and private research grants.
