= Solano Avenue Stroll =

Annual street fair in California

2009 Solano Stroll video, 09/13/2009

The Solano Avenue Stroll, also known as the Solano Stroll, is an annual street fair held on the second Sunday of September on the Solano Avenue shopping district of Albany and Berkeley, California. Stretching close to 2 miles long and bringing between 250,000 and 300,000 attendees in a single day, it has been called the oldest and largest street festival in the San Francisco Bay Area and the "world's biggest block party". In 2001, the Library of Congress's American Folklife Center in Washington, D.C. designated the festival as a "National Local Legacy".

== History ==
The Solano Stroll began in 1974 by the Thousand Oaks Merchant Association, a small business guild started by Ira Klein and co-headed by Lisa Burnham. Klein owned and managed "The Iris", a Solano clothing and jewelry store formerly based on Shattuck Avenue that sold dress goods made primarily by local fashion designers, among the earliest including Laurel Burch. Lisa Burnham (née Liesel Hirsch), an Austrian national and Holocaust survivor, owned "Northumbrian Antiques", an interior design business on Solano from the 1950s to the 1970s.

Klein conceived the festival as both a "thank you party" to customers and to promote the avenue's family-owned business community. According to a Patch.com interview with son Gabe Klein, the elder Klein's three creative influences included his childhood in New York City, the culture of Telegraph Avenue while he attended UC Berkeley in the 1960s, and his maternal cousin, George Schindler, a noted magician and film actor. Klein had been involved with the fair's planning, promotion and organizing until closing his business in 1998. Event organizer Lisa Bullwinkel directed the event for 16 years, from 1989 to 2005. Burnham died in 2001 in Berkeley, and Klein in 2007 in Springfield, Oregon. Current Citizens for East Shore Parks president and former Albany mayor Robert Cheasty, a civil attorney who runs a law firm on the avenue, is a ranking organizer of the Solano Stroll, being involved with the festival since 1984 and having served as the Solano Avenue Association's (SAA) president from 1989 to 1991.

The first festival began on a Friday evening and included only the Thousand Oaks Berkeley portion of Solano Avenue before expanding to Albany a few years later and switching to Sunday. By this time, the "Thousand Oaks Merchant's Association" would become the "Solano Avenue Association". Initially an after-hours reception for local businesses, the fair would include attractions such as magician booths, live bands, street theatre, jugglers and fire eaters by the late 1970s. Although the event has always been funded by Solano businesses, larger sponsors have included Safeway, Andronico's, Mechanic's Bank, BART as well as the city governments of Albany and Berkeley.

What would've been the 47th in 2020 ended up going on hiatus until 2022.

== The Solano Stroll ==
=== Parade and grand marshals ===
The Solano Stroll begins with an 8am breakfast served at Memorial Park, near Albany High School, before the fair's parade begins at the Eastern end of Solano Avenue in Berkeley at 10am. Since the 1980s, a grand marshal has been chosen to head the parades; previous leaders have included Buffalo Bob Smith (of 1950's NBC television show Howdy Doody) in 1996, 1972 Olympian and sports writer Craig Van Collie in 1998, sixties counterculture icon Wavy Gravy in 2000, and former Noah's Bagels CEO/founder Noal Alper in 2010, whose namesake deli still has a location on Solano Avenue. In addition to city politicians and personnel, the parade also includes marching bands and cheerleaders from high schools across the Bay Area and various performance artists or dance troupes.

=== Festival ===
After the parade closes, the street opens to pedestrians and remains closed to traffic until 6pm. Various forms of entertainment include taiko, belly dancing, karate tournaments, vintage car shows, puppet shows, clowns, stilt walkers, improvisational theater, magicians, face painting, dunk tanks, fun houses and most recently amusement rides.

=== Music ===
Local music groups, in addition to school bands, perform songs during the festival. Styles have included jazz, folk rock, alternative rock, Klezmer, Scottish folk dance, bluegrass, hip hop, R&B, soul, zydeco, roots rock, tribute/cover and taiko.

Famous past acts at the Solano Stroll have included The Uptones, Operation Ivy, Rancid and Piranha (during the 1980s); and bands (or creative members of) Blue Öyster Cult, Blind Illusion, Heathen, Alphabet Soup, Primus, The Charlie Hunter Trio, Furthur, RatDog and Country Joe and the Fish during the 1990s and 2000s (decade). From the late 1980s onward, band selection has been conducted via a jury process and fee decided by SAA members.

In 2000, Country Joe McDonald said of the fair:

It's like a picnic. I see a lot of my friends, which is great. It's a much friendlier and nicer place. You couldn't have had a Solano Stroll in the 60s...young people are a lot smarter now.

=== Cuisine ===
Over 50 food vendors have booths at the festival, most selling carnival-related American fare like corn dogs, pizza, deep fried pastries and cotton candy, but also more international choices like Thai, Cambodian, Caribbean barbecue, Latin American, Middle Eastern kebab and falafel pitas.

Chez Panisse owner Alice Waters, pioneer of the slow food movement, was recognized during the 2000 Solano Stroll's "Local Legacies on Parade."

== Political and financial issues ==
Although the Solano Stroll continues the original objective of celebrating local entrepreneurship, the event has had a more political theme in the last decade, featuring social activism and get out the vote booths of a mostly liberal leaning. On election years, the festival falls two months before November polls.

During the 2004 festival, the Daily Cal reported that two anti-gay marriage protesters were yelled at and sprayed with silly string.

In 2007, an anti-abortion protester was cited by police after spilling a pile of fetus pictures from a wheelbarrow onto the street. The same year, U.S. Representative Barbara Lee (D-CA-9) participated in the parade but left early due to excessive heckling by onlookers, apparently in relation to her sole "Nay" vote against AUMF following the attacks on September 11, 2001. In 2000, Lee was responsible for inducting the Solano Stroll into the Library of Congress' Local Legacies Project campaign.

In addition to the politically related controversies, the event has recently been affected by the financial shake-ups of various Solano businesses, including long-time Stroll sponsor Andronico's, the upscale supermarket chain which filed Chapter 11 bankruptcy protection. Andronico's first location opened on Solano Avenue in 1929 as "Andronico's Park and Shop".

Before the 2011 festival, the East Bay Express reported that live musicians would either take a pay cut or have to play for free due to the recession and lack of revenue generated from The Solano Avenue Association. The article reported that two bands withdrew from the 2011 Solano Stroll, which was held on the 10th anniversary of 9/11 and ran on a theme of "unsung heroes".

== Notes ==
A Brief History of the Solano Avenue Stroll
