= Middle Creek (California) =

River in California, United States

Middle Creek is a major tributary of Cerrito Creek in Albany, California.

The creek runs begins at the confluence of Blackberry Creek and Capistrano Creek, on the western edge of Berkeley's Thousand Oaks neighborhood. It flows west, both above ground and through culverts before discharging into Cerrito Creek in Creekside Park, on the north side of Albany Hill near San Francisco Bay. It is looked after by the Friends of the Five Creeks, a community organization.
