= MacGregor High School =

Coordinates: 37°53′35.23″N 122°18′9.83″W

Location
- 601 San Gabriel Ave. Albany, California; United States

Information
- Type: Public continuation high school
- School district: Albany Unified School District
- Principal: Alexia Ritchie
- Teaching staff: 1.09 (FTE)
- Grades: 10-12
- Enrollment: 10 (2023–2024)
- Student to teacher ratio: 9.17
- Campus: Semi-urban
- Website: MacGregor High School

MacGregor High School is a continuation high school located in Albany, California, United States. It is part of the Albany Unified School District.

Students at MacGregor are individuals who are considered at-risk at Albany High School, and were recommended to attend MacGregor by a counselor. Often, they are behind in college credit and are not likely to graduate at their current pace.

Instead of a traditional semester schedule, MacGregor operates on six week periods, as students are likely to rejoin Albany High School when performance improves.

The student population is around 55.

In the fall of 2008 MacGregor founded its first ever student government and elected a student body president.
