= Louis Mackey =

Louis Mackey may refer to:

- Louis Mackey (American football) (born 1977), American football linebacker
- Louis Mackey (philosopher) (1926–2004), American philosopher
