= Richmond Inner Harbor =

Body of water in Richmond, California, United States

Coordinates: 37.9018697°N 122.3410816°W

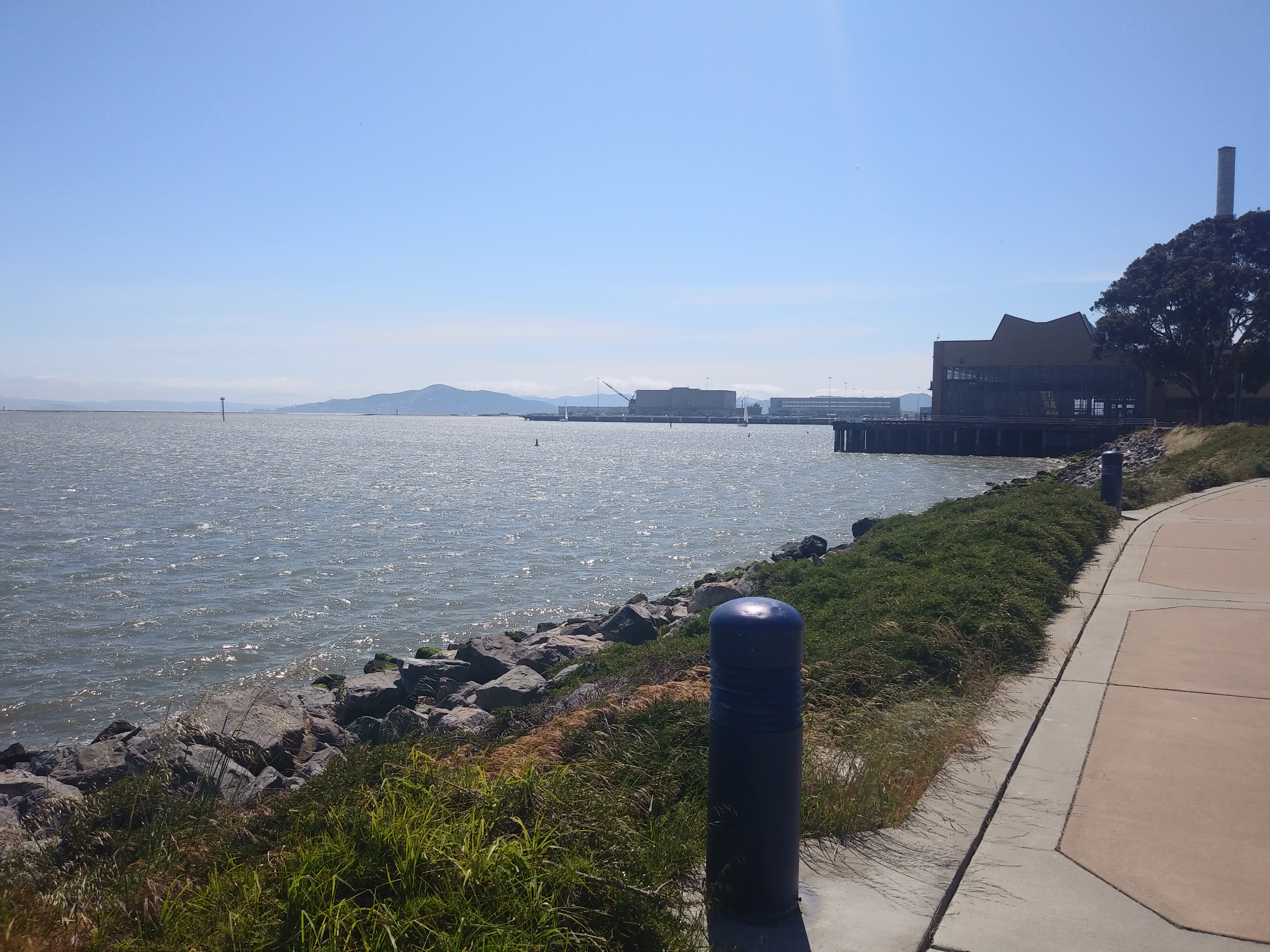
Richmond Inner Harbor as seen from Lucretia Edwards Park

Richmond Inner Harbor is a deepwater body of water in Richmond, California.

== History ==
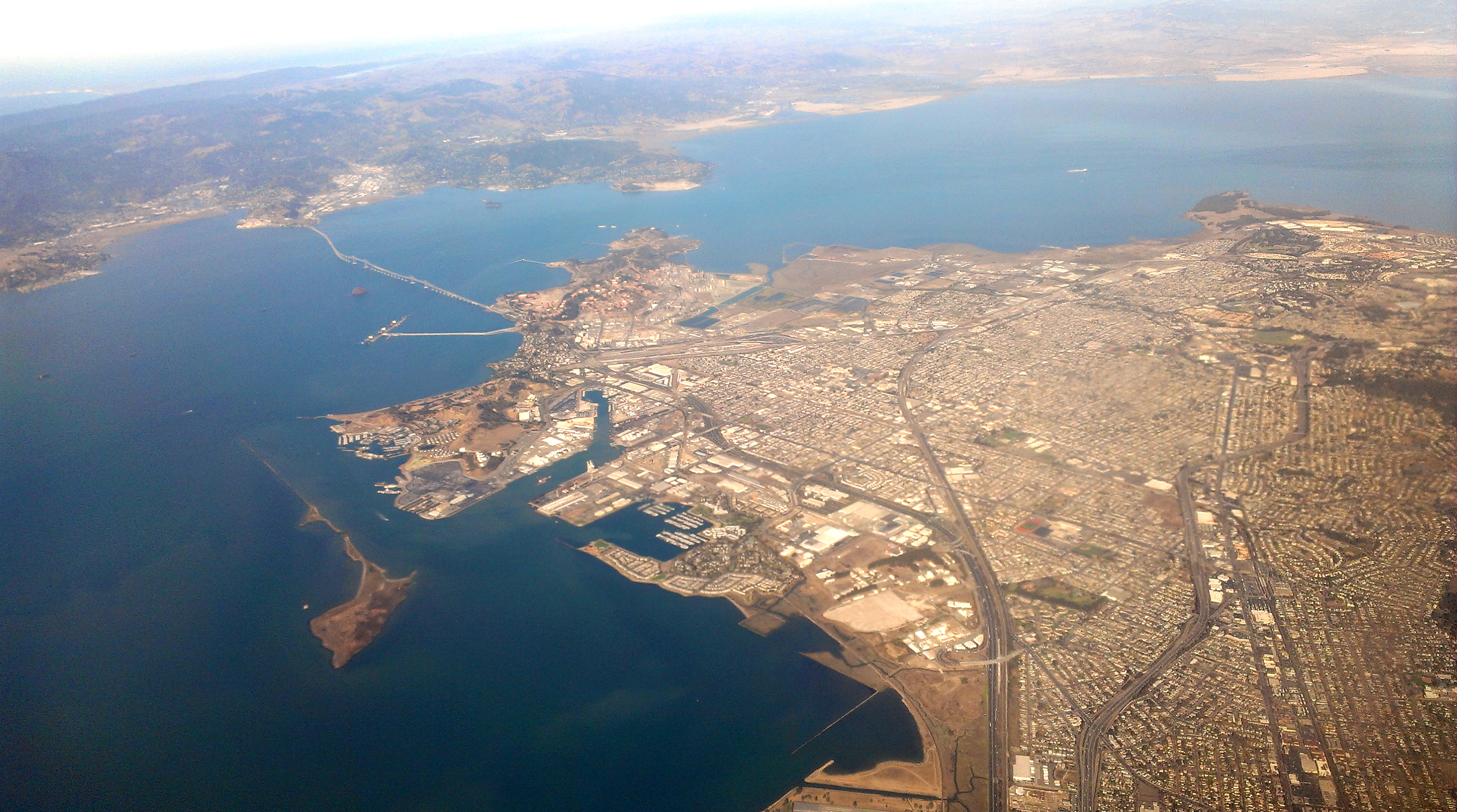
Aerial view of Richmond Inner Harbor

The harbor lies between Ferry Point and Point Isabel, between the mainland and Brooks Island in western Contra Costa County along the East Bay's northern East Shore. The harbor provides excellent protection as it lies protected by Brooks Island an extensive breakwater inside the already protected San Francisco Bay. The harbour connects to the Santa Fe Channel and its chanellets in addition to the Richmond Marina Bay and Campus Bay. Baxter Creek and Meeker Slough Creek's mouths and deltas drain into the harbor.

== See also ==
- Richmond Shipyards
