= Richmond Field Station =

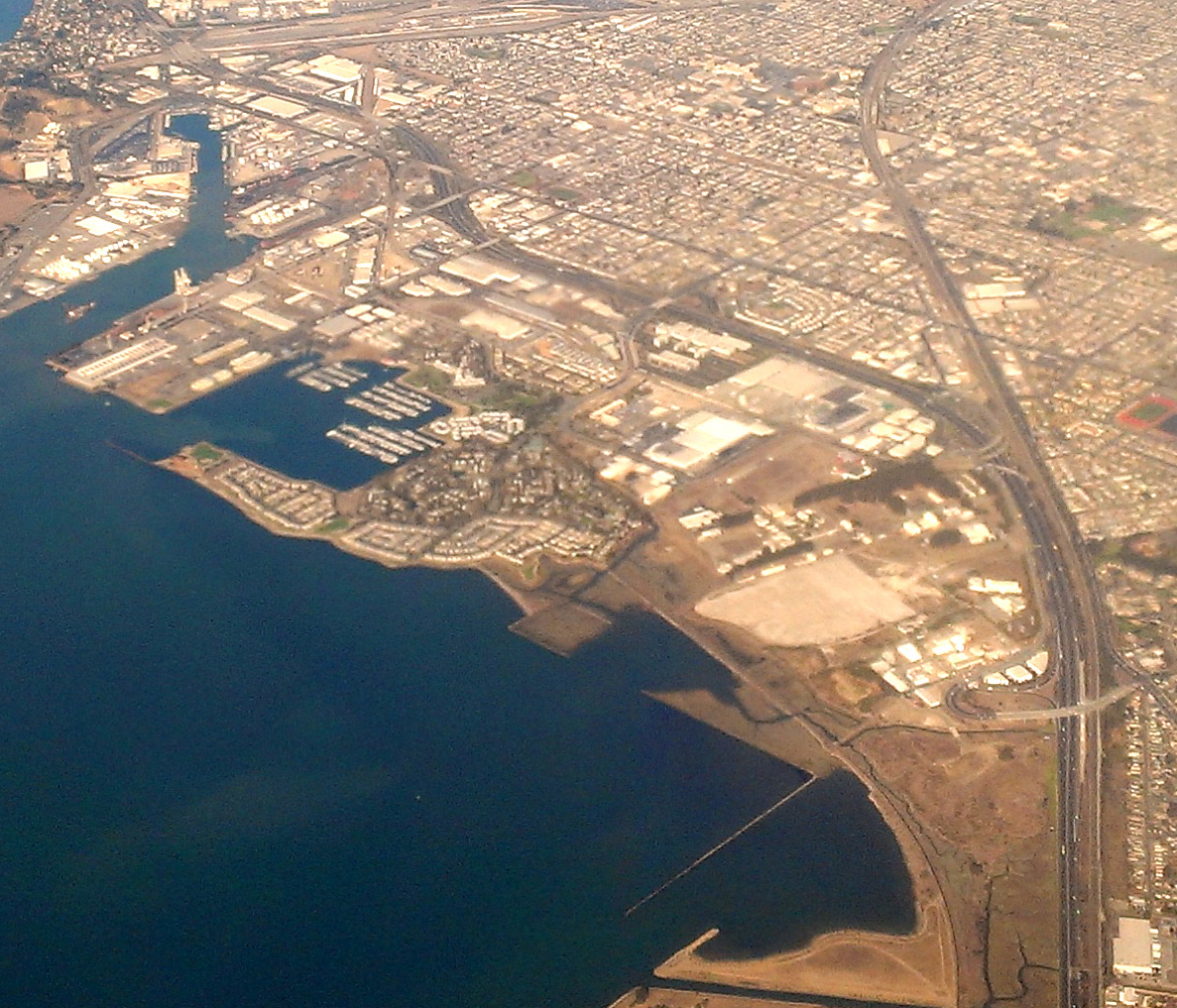
- RFS is bounded approximately by Richmond Bay (on the south), Interstate 580 (north), S 46th St (east), and Marina Bay Pkwy and Regatta Blvd (west)

Location
- 1301 South 46th St; Richmond, California
- Coordinates: 37.915°N 122.335°W

Information
- Former name: Richmond Bay Campus; Berkeley Global Campus at Richmond Bay
- Affiliation: University of California, Berkeley

The Richmond Field Station (RFS) is a satellite campus of the University of California, Berkeley located in Richmond, California. The name was changed to the Richmond Bay Campus (RBC) in 2012 and then Berkeley Global Campus at Richmond Bay (BGC) in October 2014, reflecting plans to expand the site to address global issues, first as a second campus for Lawrence Berkeley National Laboratory (LBNL), then as an expansion of the main campus in Berkeley itself. In 2016, the expansion plans were suspended and the name reverted to Richmond Field Station.

== Site ==
The Richmond Field Station is in the South Shoreline neighborhood of Richmond, just north of Albany and west/south of I-580, approximately 15–20 minutes away from the main campus in Berkeley by car. The site is 125 acres (51 ha) in total, including the adjacent Regatta Industrial Center purchased by the university. There are three distinct habitats on site: the Upland Area, Transition Area, and Western Stege Marsh. The marsh area is further subdivided into low, middle, and high salt marshes and tidal wetlands with native species including the endangered California clapper rail.

A wooden seawall was constructed along the tidal mudflat prior to 1950, including a wooden pier that extended south, possibly before the acquisition of the site by California Cap. The Stege Marsh was formed after the Southern Pacific Railroad Company added fill to the site to build a rail spur in 1959.

== History ==
Native Americans used the site for fishing and shellfish harvesting, as evidenced by the presence of neighboring shellmounds, some of which were removed in 1915 for the development of the Harborgate tract in Richmond. It was part of the Rancho San Pablo land grant given to Francisco Maria Castro in 1823, which was subsequently subdivided and sold in the 1850s. One of the owners was Richard Stege, who raised bullfrogs for sale to San Francisco restaurants. By the 1880s, the site was acquired by the California Cap Company, which manufactured explosives and blasting shells alongside smaller companies such as the U.S. Briquette Company and Pacific Cartridge Company. California Cap ceased operations in 1948. Explosive manufacturing activities included the production of mercury fulminate and has resulted in mercury contamination at the site.

The first 100 acres (40 ha) of what would become Richmond Field Station were acquired from California Cap in 1950; the western section (between Regatta Blvd and Avocet Wy) was acquired in 1951. An additional 25-acre (10 ha) parcel (formerly the neighboring Regatta Industrial Center, just west of the original site) was acquired after 2008.

Starting from the 1950s, UC Berkeley conducted large-scale engineering research at RFS for projects which were not suited for the central campus in Berkeley, including research in solid waste and sewage, transportation and lighting, and beach erosion. For sanitary engineering research, the laboratory established at RFS has been called the Sanitary Engineering Research Laboratory, Sanitary Engineering and Environmental Health Research Laboratory, and Environmental Engineering and Health Sciences Laboratory; its activities included construction of a rectangular oxidation pond, a circular digester, and treatment of chicken wastes, which included an on-site chicken coop. RFS also includes the Earthquake Engineering Research Center, with a large earthquake shaking table to simulate seismic events. In addition, the Northern Regional Library Facility is located at RFS; NRLF is a cooperative library storage facility encompassing more than 4.7 million items in three buildings, storing some of the holdings of the libraries of the University of California campuses in northern California, including Berkeley, Davis, Merced, San Francisco, Santa Cruz, and the California State Library.

Several tenants lease space at RFS from the University of California, most notably the U.S. EPA, which operates its Region 9 Laboratory at RFS.

=== Second campus ===
On January 3, 2011, UC Berkeley announced a request for qualifications (RFQ), soliciting sites for a second campus for LBNL, requiring the new site to accommodate 2,000,000 sq ft gross (190,000 m^{2}) of new research and development facilities; the RFQ included a caveat that UC had already identified Richmond Field Station as a suitable candidate site. The city of Richmond responded by passing Resolution 10–11 on February 1, advocating for the second campus to be sited at RFS after receiving numerous letters of support from the community. Later that month, LBNL and UC Berkeley completed a conceptual plan for the second campus at RFS and issued a second RFQ for developers of its Richmond Field Station Campus Concept Plan on May 12. Subsequently, LBNL announced the second campus at RFS would be named the Richmond Bay Campus in January 2012, but budget cuts in 2013 forced them to scrap their plans. Despite the budget cuts, the Regents of the University of California approved the long-range development plan (LRDP) and environmental impact report for RBC in May 2014. Under the LRDP,

UC Berkeley Chancellor Nicholas Dirks announced the proposed development would continue as the Berkeley Global Campus at Richmond Bay on 29 October 2014. In an address to the Academic Senate, Dirks stated the new campus would serve as a research hub and education center to solve global problems in energy, medicine, economy, and environment. The stated research mission was similar to that originally intended for the RBC.

In August 2016, just before he resigned as chancellor, Dirks announced that the university would be suspending plans for the project. The name has been suspended as well and has returned to Richmond Field Station.

== Transportation ==
Prior to the COVID-19 pandemic in California, UC Berkeley operated a Bear Transit route between the main campus in Berkeley and RFS. The route was not resumed when campus operations restarted in June 2021, and public transit users were advised to take AC Transit route 79 to El Cerrito Plaza station, then transfer to route 71 and walk to RFS. AC Transit Route 74 also passed close to the RFS campus.
