= Friends of Five Creeks =

Volunteer organization in California, US

- Formation: 1996
- Type: Parent organization is a registered non-profit
- Purpose: Wildlife habitat protection
- Headquarters: Albany Community Center, 1249 Marin
- Members: Volunteer
- Leader: Susan Schwartz
- Parent organization: Berkeley Partners for Parks
- Website: www.fivecreeks.org

Friends of Five Creeks (FFC) is a regional community volunteer organization founded in 1996 by Sonja Wadman originally dedicated to the stewardship of creeks in northern Alameda County and western Contra Costa, California, United States. Education about wildlife and restoration is also a major facet of the FFC's mission.

== History ==
The organization is dedicated to improving creek habitats for environmental, flood control, pollution filtration, and beautification reasons. The original five creeks were Cerrito Creek-Middle/Blackberry, Marin Creek, Codornices Creek, Schoolhouse Creek and Marin/Village Creek, however the organization's involvement has expanded to all the creeks in the area including the communities of Berkeley, Albany, El Cerrito, Kensington, Richmond, and the surrounding unincorporated areas. Susan Schwartz, the organization's leader, states that the organization like other "friends of" groups would not have gotten off the ground without help from the Urban Creeks Council. The group holds up to 40 events a year where the volunteers work on refuse collection, graffiti removal, removing culverts in addition to plating native vegetation and removing invasive species. There is a monthly work party to pick weeds and showcase the area's natural habitats with a new site each month. The organization is registered with the California Coastal Commission.

== Creek work ==
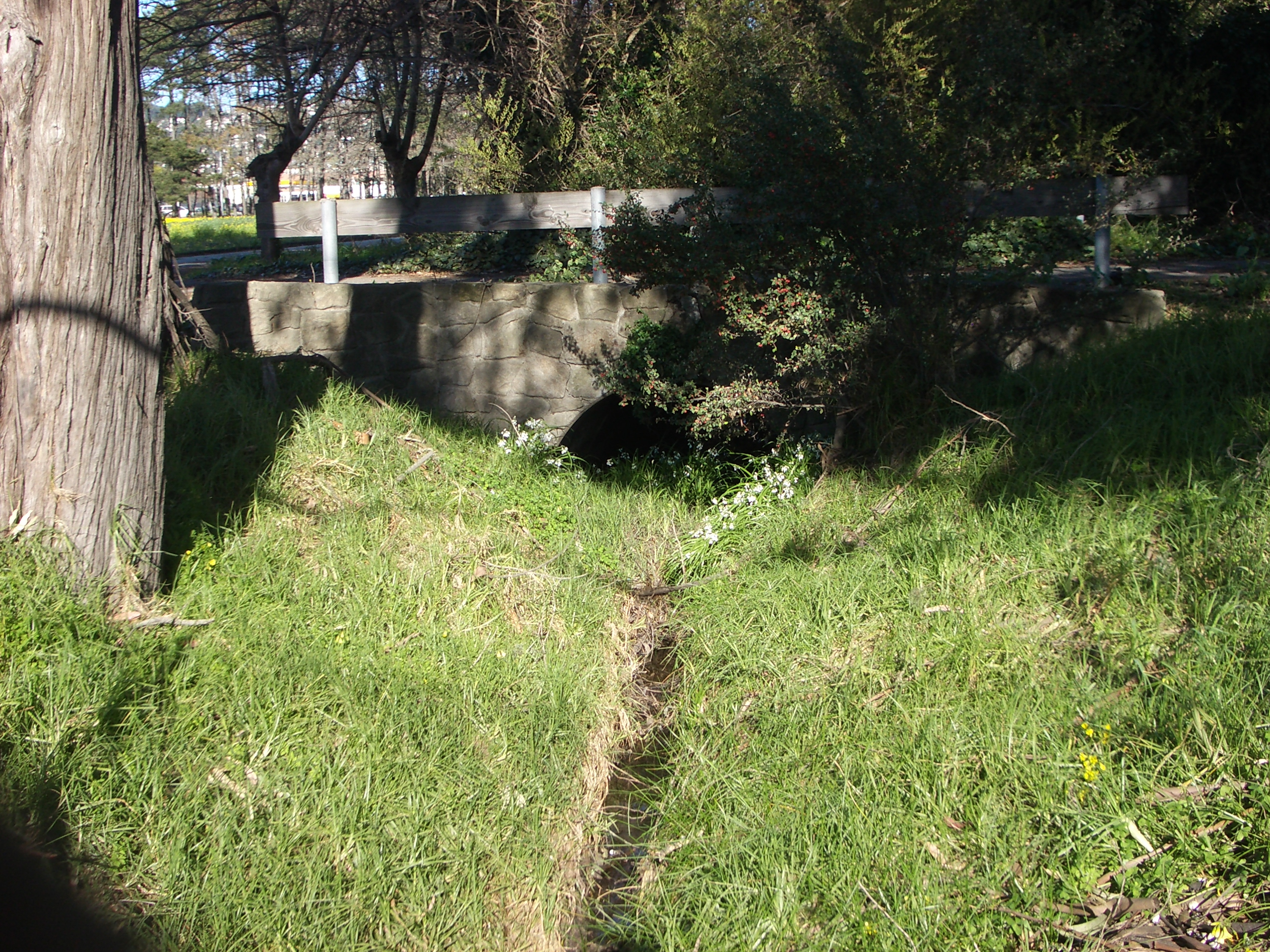
Village Creek is maintained by FFC.

The organization organizes more than 40 work parties each year, providing direction and tools for groups of volunteers who work to restore a section of one of the creeks.

Cerrito Creek runs from the El Cerrito hills to the San Francisco Bay. The organization has daylighted and restored a portion of the creek along the parking lot of El Cerrito Plaza Shopping Center. Further down stream part of the creek runs through Pacific East Mall's parking lot, where it forms the border between Richmond and Albany. This portion of the creek was daylighted and restored by the organization in 2003. Berkeley Daily Planet columnist Ron Sullivan reports a statement from FFC's Susan Schwartz that Pacific East Mall landscapers in Richmond have used herbicides, and speculates that this could explain her (Sullivan's) observations of dead grasses, plants and trees along the creek path near the mall's property line. Furthermore, Sullivan reports allegations and concludes from seeing the results that small native shrubs were mowed, and reports allegations that the mall has not agreed to a written maintenance plan as required by its use permit.

In 2001 the organization received two separate grants totaling $400,000 to work on the restoration of Codornices Creek. In the 1990s the Friends of Five Creeks discovered the reappearance of steelhead and rainbow trout at Codornices Creek while performing restoration work. The "Friends" are also lobbying for the creation of public space adjacent to the creek for a new Whole Foods supermarket and parking structure along the stream's banks in U.C. Village.

The organization also helps to restore and work on some non-creek areas such as the Berkeley Meadow and Eastshore State Park in addition to blight abatement, and trash collection activities at local parks. Working with Citizens for Eastshore Parks FFC is studying the possibility of daylighting a portion of Schoolhouse Creek.

== Education work ==
Friends of Five Creeks works with school groups to educate them about the creek and bay environments.
