= Brooks Island Regional Preserve =

Island in the United States of America

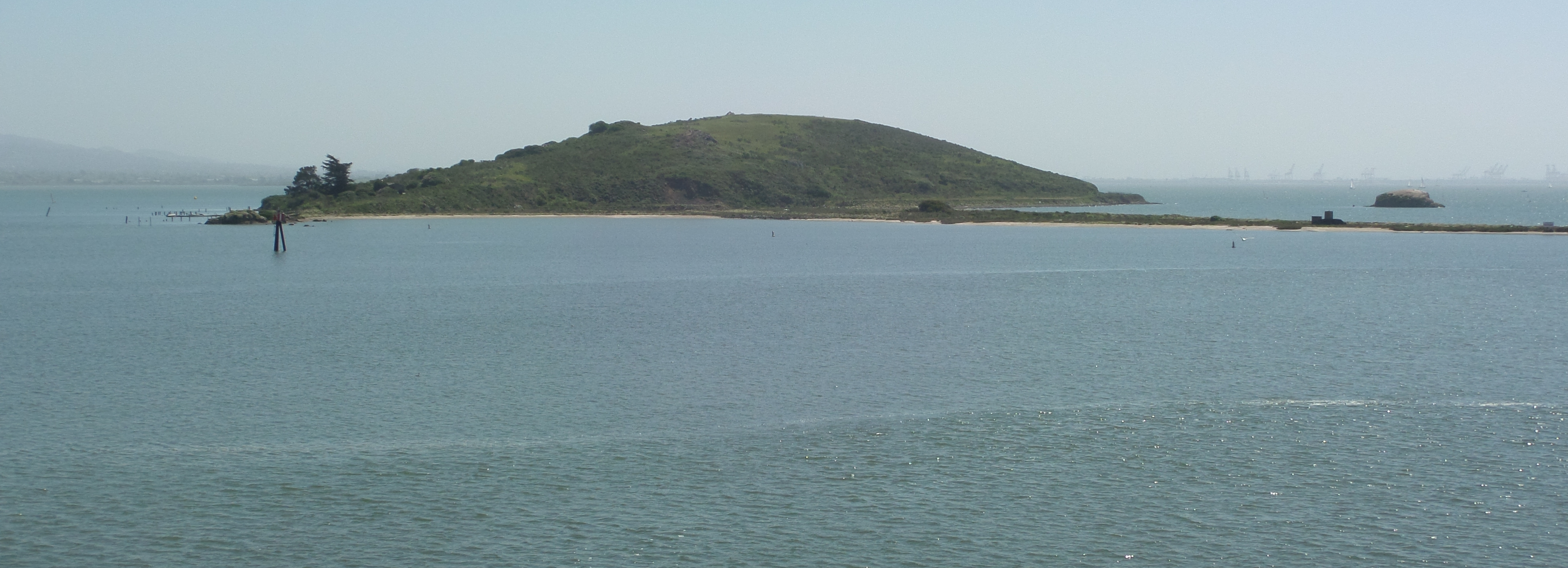
- The main portion of Brooks Island. At right is the start of the sandspit that extends about two miles west of the main island. Beyond the spit is the small rock of Bird Island.

- Location within San Francisco Bay Area Location within California Location within the United States

Geography
- Location: San Francisco Bay, Richmond, California
- Coordinates: 37°53′47″N 122°21′19″W
- Adjacent to: Richmond Inner Harbor
- Area: 75 acres (30 ha)
- Length: 2 mi (3 km)
- Width: 0.25 mi (0.4 km)
- Highest elevation: 160 ft (49 m)
- Highest point: Jefferds Peak

Administration
- United States
- State: California
- County: Contra Costa
- City: Richmond, California
- Administered by: East Bay Regional Park District

Demographics
- Population: 1 (2009)

Additional information
- Official website: https://www.ebparks.org/parks/brooks-island

Brooks Island Regional Preserve includes both the 75-acre (30 ha) of Brooks Island above the low-tide line and 300 acres (120 ha) of the surrounding bay. The only public access to the island is via an East Bay Regional Park District naturalist tour.

Brooks Island is a mostly flat strip of land extending from a round hill, named Jefferds Hill, which peaks at 160 ft (49 m) in San Francisco Bay, located just south of the Richmond Inner Harbor in Richmond, California.

Originally named as Isla de Cármen by a Spanish explorer, the island appeared as "Brooks Island" on maps from 1850 onward. The eponymous Brooks has never been identified. It has also been called Sheep Island and Rocky Island at various times. The island was bought by the regional parks district in 1968, and was opened to the public in 1988. Access is now available through ranger-led guided tours.

== History ==
=== Ohlone period ===
On the island are the remains of several shellmounds left from prolonged occupation by Native Americans, most likely people from the Ohlone tribe, sustained by the abundant sea life in the surrounding bay. The park district's 1976 resource analysis identified the tribes as "Huchium [Huchiun] or perhaps Chochenyo", and speculated that as many as 15,000 people might have lived on the land over the course of 2,000 to 3,000 years.

The first archeological excavation on Brooks Island was conducted by Nels Nelson of UC Berkeley in 1907. More systematic excavations of shellmounds on Brooks Island began in 1960 with the excavation of shellmound sites CCo-290 and CCo-291 on the northeast shore by George Coles of Contra Costa College, and Vera-Mae and Dave Fredrickson.

Coles' excavation of the largest shellmound (d. 2015) during the 1960s, which produced carbon-14 dates of 1,700–2,000 years before present for the oldest materials in the mound. Coles estimated that the Ohlone occupation of the site may date back more than 3,000 years. His study found bones from cormorants, ducks and other waterbirds (but no pelicans). Marine mammal bones included harbor seals, sea lions, porpoises and whales. These early residents used atlatls and harpoons with bone points. Even though the mound showed evidence of large catches of fish, especially herring, there were no fishhooks found, indicating that perhaps nets were used. Mollusks such as mussels, oysters, and clams were a large portion of the diet.

From CCo-290, Vera-Mae Fredrickson reported the excavation of two small, elongated, painted pebbles of fine-grained sandstone, one with a single 4mm red band across it, the other with two. Frederickson was unable to find similar specimens elsewhere in central California, but did note similarities with pebbles excavated near Los Angeles. Comparison with other similar painted stones and shells suggested that they might have been used as gaming pieces or dice, or that the two designs might have been intended to symbolize male and female elements.

Coles's research showed that the use of the island was stable over a long period, but not whether occupation there was year-round or seasonal. Kent Lightfoot of UC Berkeley is reanalyzing Coles's material to determine whether seasonal patterns can be identified. The latest carbon-14 date from the shellmound material is about 300 years ago, but it is possible that the island was used until the era of European contact. The Richmond Museum of History acquired Coles's collection of Brooks Island artifacts following his death in 2015.

=== Early European period ===
Juan Manuel de Ayala conducted the first nautical survey of San Francisco Bay in 1775 and named the island Isla de Cármen. In the early 19th century, while California was a Spanish colony, it became part of Rancho San Pablo. However, Spanish records from that period do not mention any settlement on the island.

By 1850, the island appears as "Brooks Island" on an 1850 survey map of the San Francisco Bay area made by Cadwalader Ringgold, a name that was formalized in the state legislature's definitive map of California in 1853. However, no record has been found as to which Brooks the island was named for.

During the 19th century the island was also called Sheep Island. One apocryphal story relates how a Croatian immigrant named Luccas Gargurevich who settled on the island in 1870 told his son Anton that "The man on Goat Island raised sheep, and I raised goats, so I have named it Sheep Island." Despite this, Gargurevich seems unlikely to be the source for this alternative name as Sheep Island appears on an 1856 map. In 1880, Gargurevich was joined on the island by his new wife Dominica, and they had nine children while living there. To educate them, he built a schoolroom and hired a teacher who traveled from Oakland. After Dominica died in childbirth, Luccas and his children left the island. Today, only a stone wall remains from the buildings of this period.

As well as using the island to graze sheep and cattle in the 19th century, the nearshore waters were also used for oyster farming.

Also during the 1870s, the Central Pacific Railroad drew up plans to build a freight terminal on the island, but work was never begun.

The first quarry opened on the southern flank of the island in 1892. Quarrying of the greywacke sandstone continued for 46 years until 1938, leading to another alternative name: Rocky Island.

=== 20th century ===
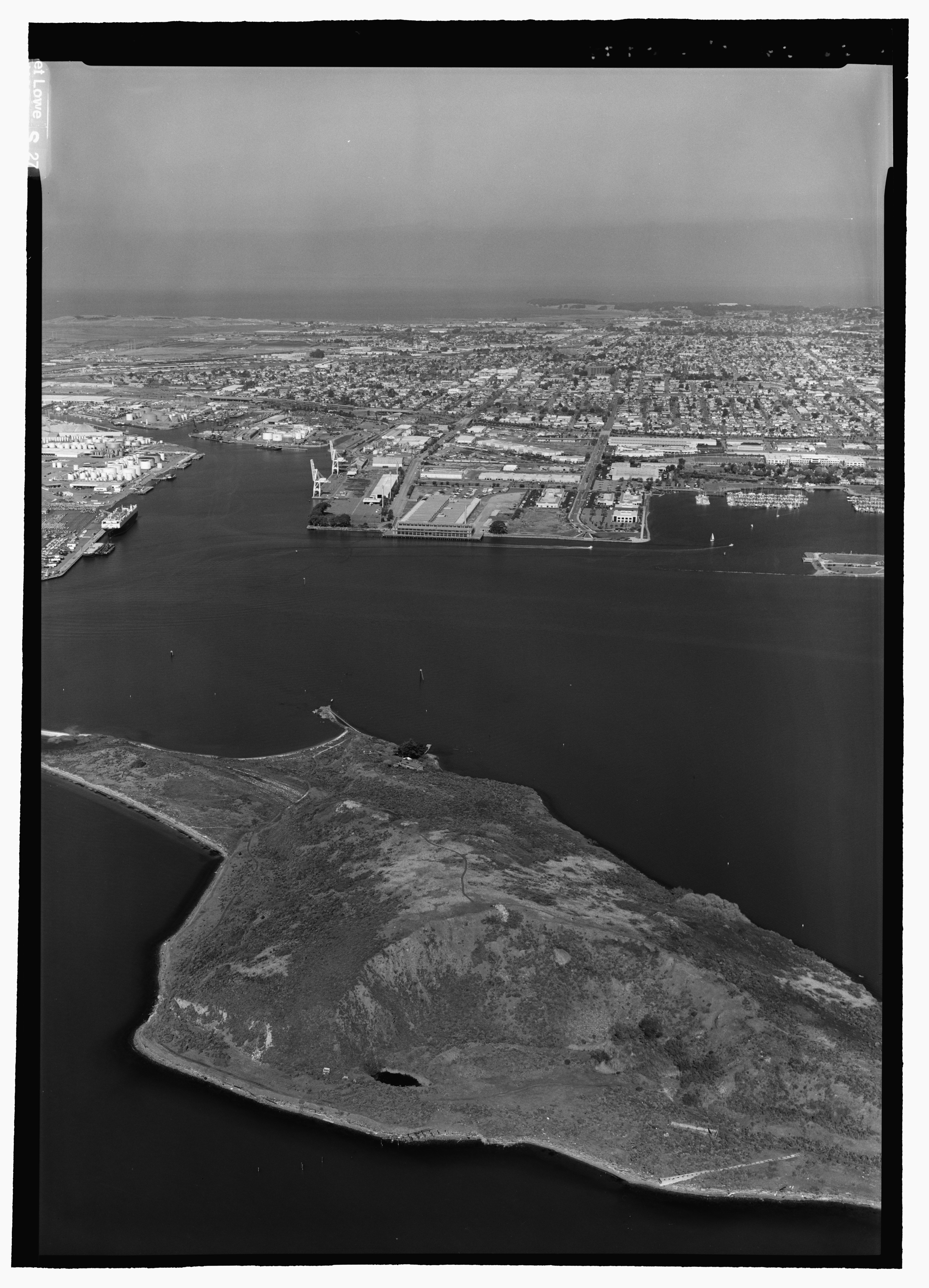
This 2004 photo shows the scar on the island's south flank from decades of quarrying.

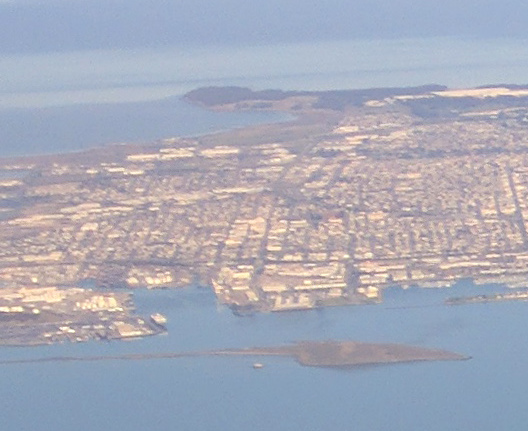
Brooks Island, viewed from the south, in an aerial photo from 2018

The quarrying operation continued in the early decades of the 20th century, with prisoners from San Quentin reportedly using the stone from this quarry to build the prison's south cell block (completed in 1913).

During World War I the U.S. Navy considered leveling Brooks Island to build a battleship dock. By 1917, the Navy had determined that the existing Mare Island Naval Shipyard was suitable only for ships with a maximum draft of 30 feet, and that a new yard should be developed in San Francisco Bay to cater for ships up to 40 feet in draft. Starting with a list of 17 localities around the bay, the Navy narrowed this to four: Hunters Point, Alameda, Goat Island (now known as Yerba Buena Island) and Richmond–Albany. The navy considered four alternative plans in the Richmond–Albany area. Three of the four would have been at sites between Brooks Island and Point Isabel (to the east); the other plan proposed a site to the west of Brooks Island. However, the dock was eventually built at Hunters Point in San Francisco instead.

The island also housed as a shrimp processing factory for a time.

In the 1923, the U.S. Army Corps of Engineers was assigned to build the initial 800 ft (240 m) of a breakwater or "training wall" heading west of Brooks Island to protect the Richmond Inner Harbor and preserve the deep Harbor Channel connecting the bay with the Port of Richmond. Again, stone from the quarry at the southern tip of Brooks Island was used for this purpose. Over many years of subsequent repairs and extensions, the training wall grew to about 10,000 ft (3,000 m) and siltation built up sand flats of about 30 acres (12 ha) along its length.

The scale of quarrying accelerated from 1918. Sandstone from the Brooks Island quarry was reportedly used for the foundations of Treasure Island (1936-7), the Bay Bridge toll plaza (1936) and Berkley's Aquatic Park (1937). The quarry ceased operating in the 1940s.

Following World War II there were several unrealized plans for the island, including one in the 1950s by the City of Richmond to build a heliport and a causeway from Point Isabel and one by the marine engineering company Ben C. Gerwick, Inc. to flatten the hill in order to facilitate industrial and commercial development. At the same time, there were unrealized plans for a public park by Contra Costa County (1955) and the state (1956), followed by an attempt by Richmond in 1961 to buy the island for a small boat harbor. The purchase price proved too expensive for the city.

In the 1960s, the property was leased by the Sheep Island Gun Club, which stocked the island with a variety of exotic game birds, including pheasants (1962), chukar and bobwhite quail for shooting. Club members included singer Frank Sinatra and Vic Bergeron, owner of Trader Vic's restaurant. At one point, the club attempted to stock the island with deer, but the deer tended to swim back to the mainland.

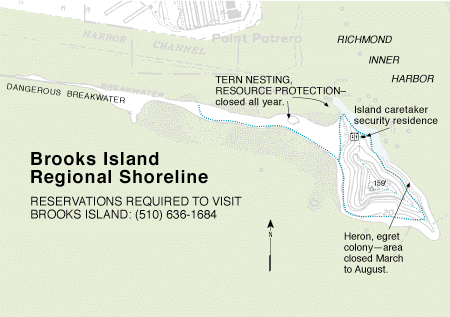
Map of Brooks Island Regional Preserve

After many attempts at commercial development, in 1968 the main portion of the island was purchased by the East Bay Regional Park District from a family trust for $625,000, funded by grants from the federal Department of Housing and Urban Development and California State Recreation and Park Bond. EBRPD later added surrounding tide lands to this initial purchase and the City of Richmond purchased the sand spit and adjoining water lots. The state purchased the final 16 acres (6.5 ha) private lot on the sand spit in 1985, with a plan for this to be leased to EBRPD.

Despite the change in ownership, the gun club continued to lease the island and kept caretakers there.

=== Development of the park ===
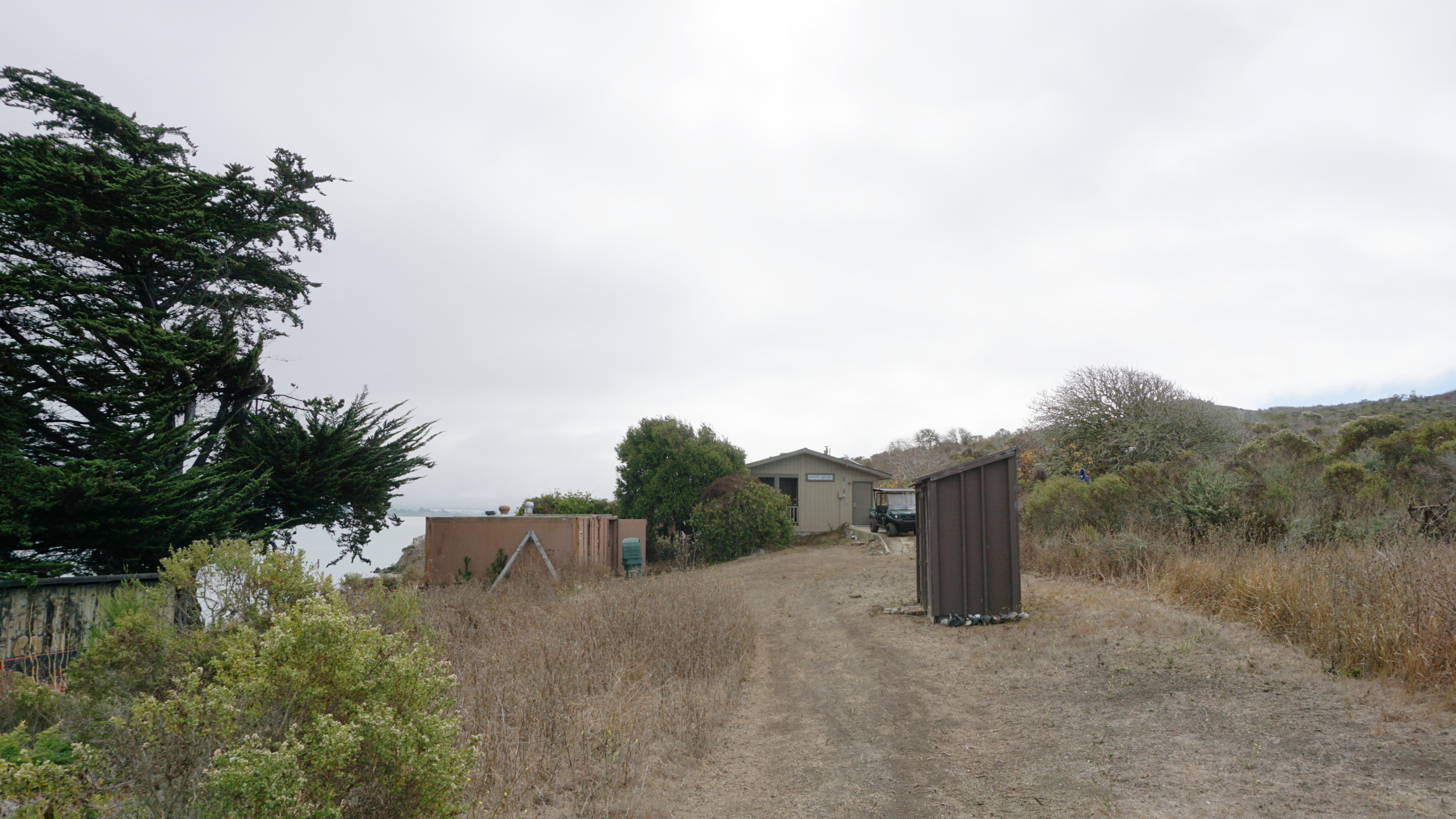
On the northeast shore is a small residence for the full-time caretaker that EBRPD maintains on Brooks Island.

Planning for the park began with the initial public purchase in 1968 but suffered several setbacks. A 1972 concept planning study by an outside consultant was not implemented. EBRPD's 1973 master plan designated the site as a regional shoreline and by 1976 a resource analysis for the island had been prepared and presented at two public hearings in Richmond. This analysis highlighted the value of the island's prehistoric settlements and its natural habitat resources and resulted in a new designation as a regional preserve. Another hiccup came in 1978 when the land use development plan for the main portion of the island in public ownership was not adopted by EBRPD's board.

A new EBRPD master plan in 1980 fine-tuned the island's designation once more: It would now be "a regional shoreline to be operated under the regional preserve category". Nevertheless, the early 1980s did see substantive progress. EBRPD and Richmond formed a liaison committee and agreed to rework the land use development plan to incorporate the whole island, culminating in an environmental impact report (EIR) that was presented in Richmond in August 1984 and finalized in September 1985. This EIR primarily analyzed EBRPD's proposed land use plan, which proposed ending hunting and opening the island to limited public access via a park-owned shuttle boat or private craft. The plan envisaged instituting controlled burns to maintain the balance of grassland and brush, placing a full-time caretaker on the island, using riprap to protect historic sites from erosion, and closing Bird Island and the west end of the sandspit to protect birds' nesting areas. The plan was to be funded from a 1984 statewide bond.

The EIR also considered six alternatives. The mandatory "no project" alternative was seen as degrading the island's habitat over time through increasing shrub growth and subsequent wildfires; the EIR painted a picture of the shooting club then abandoning its lease and vandals looting the shellmounds. A second alternative encompassing public suggestions such as a restaurant, observation tower or hotel complex was dismissed as obviously more impactful than the district's plan. Greater environmental impacts were also identified for three more alternatives: one with no on-site caretaker (and therefore more vandalism), one with a new pier (expensive and likely infeasible), and one where the caretaker's residence would be relocated. The final alternative considered was for EBRPD to sell the island to a private buyer, which was rejected because of the clear conflict with the district's mission.

The island was eventually opened for limited public access in 1988. EBRPD began running interpretive tours in 1991.

One caretaker from the regional park district lives on the island year-round in a solar-powered cabin. The remnants of human occupation have generally been left to decay, rather than removed entirely. These include pilings extending into the bay, and equipment and ponds left over from the quarry workings on the southern shore. But the park district caretaker does remove litter that washes up on the beaches.

== Geography and geology ==
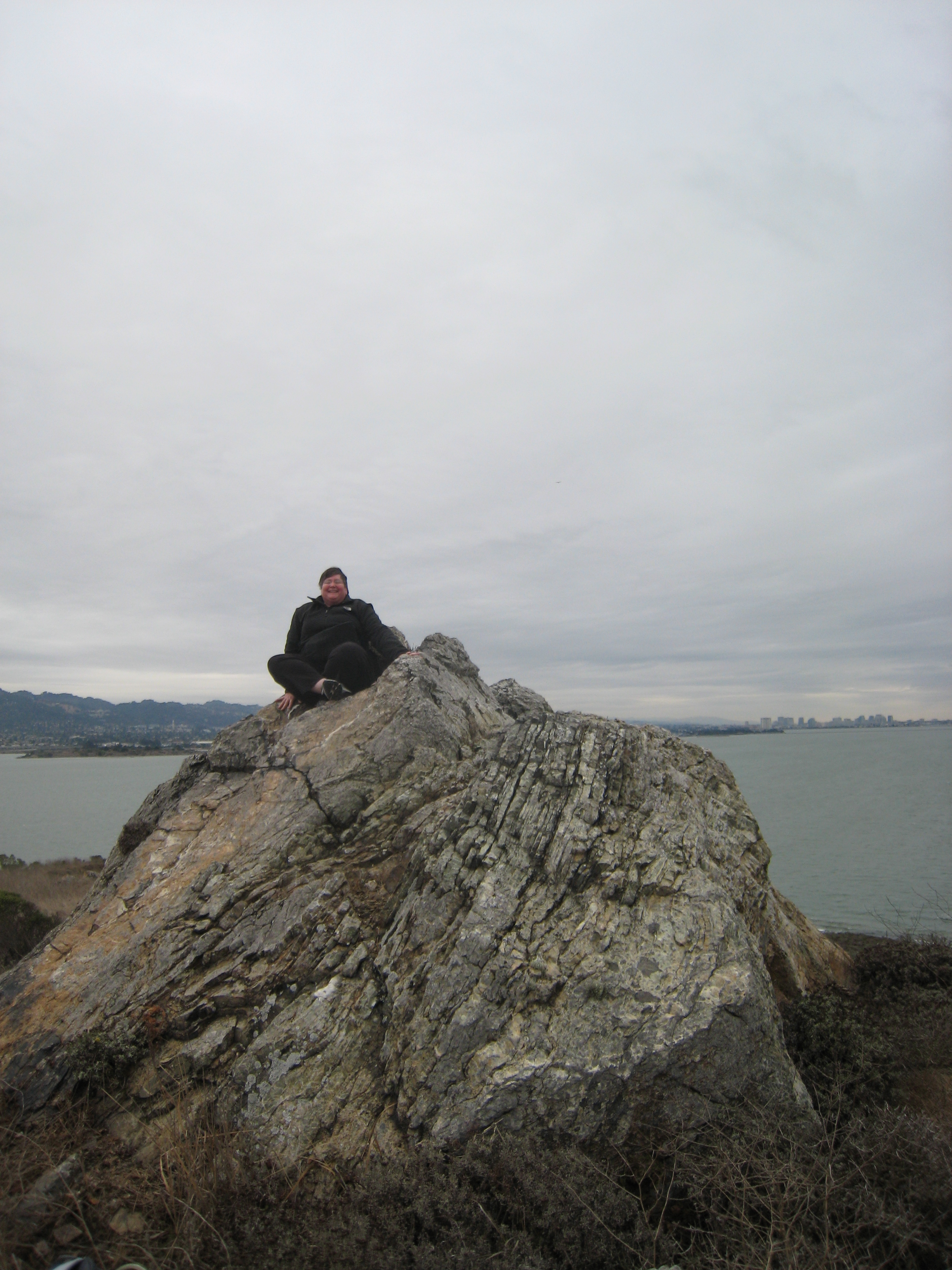
Exposed rock on Brooks Island

The rock that forms the main peak of the island is radiolarian chert underlain by limestone and graywacke sandstone. All these rocks are part of the Franciscan Assemblage, the same range as Albany Hill, 3 miles south, and the Coyote Hills, 25 miles south in Hayward. This Franciscan formation is derived from sediments laid down in the sea west of San Francisco during the Late Jurassic and Cretaceous (150-66 million years ago) and then scraped off onto the edge of the North American Plate during the subduction of the Farallon Plate. The main portion of the island covers an area of approximately 47 acres (19 ha), with the tidal lands along the breakwater covering approximately 30 acres (12 ha) more.

A short distance from the southwest coast of the main island is Bird Rock or Bird Island, occupying approximately 0.5 acres (0.20 ha).

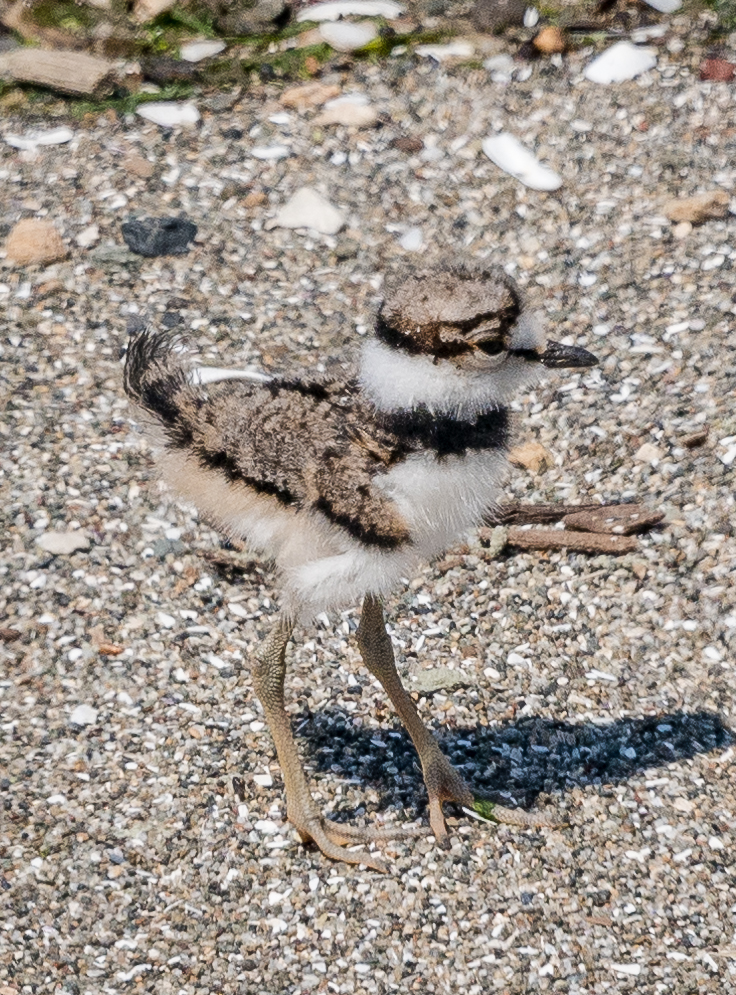
A killdeer chick on the sandspit west of the main island

The sandspit that extends for about two miles west of the main island formed along a breakwater that was installed in the 1920s to preserve a deepwater channel to the Richmond Inner Harbor.

During the last ice age San Francisco Bay was a valley, and Brooks Island was just one hill of many along its western slope. As sea level rose, the valley was flooded and Brooks Island was cut off from the rest of the East Bay. Although the island is quite small, there is a permanent spring, which is used by the caretakers as a water source.

== Ecology ==
The island hosts salt marshes, tidal flats and has a rise of 160 ft (49 m). It is home to many bird species, including herons and egrets, and provides their nesting sites. Some parts of the islands are off limits to visitors to protect nesting sites.

=== Mammals ===
Brooks Island had no native land mammals prior to European contact. Domestic mammals including cattle, sheep, goats, horses and dogs were introduced intentionally between the late 18th and mid-20th centuries. House mice (Mus musculus) and Norway rats (Rattus norvegicus) were apparently introduced accidentally during this period. Although mice were later displaced by voles, Norway rats persist along the island's shores, where they have access to carrion and marine food sources, such as bay mussels (Mytilus trossulus). During dry periods, rats may occasionally prey on voles. At one point, the island caretaker controlled the rat population through poisoning.

One mammal species was apparently introduced deliberately by biologists. In the summer of 1957, seven California voles (Microtus californicus), four males and three females, were introduced to Bird Island with the apparent aim of measuring the population growth rate on an unoccupied land mass. Very quickly, voles were discovered to have crossed the 230 yd (210 m) of water eastward to Brooks Island and were reproducing there. Within two years, they had spread across the entire island from west to east and had apparently exterminated the entire population of house mice. The biologists believed this occurred because the stress of competition caused the house mice to stop reproducing. Today, voles are present throughout Brooks Island, but most notably in the grassland habitat, where the ground is riddled with burrows. The population has a very high frequency of buff fur color, thought to be a founder effect due to the small original population.

Brooks Island is a habitat for harbor seals that haul out at the island en route from their nearby rookery on the Castro Rocks.

=== Reptiles, amphibians and fish ===
When the sea level rose after the Ice Age, populations of salamanders and garter snakes were marooned on Brooks Island, where they persist today.

There are three species of amphibians on the island. The slender salamander (Batrachoseps attenuatus) is found in the north and east of the island, where the soil is damp most of the year. The arboreal salamander (Aneides lugubris) is represented by a small population around the pond in the former quarry on the southern shore. The Sierran chorus frog (Pseudacris sierra) has also been reported from Brooks Island, but it is unclear whether there is a breeding population.

Two color phases of the western terrestrial garter snake (Thamnophis elegans), one with a red background the other with a green background, are present on Brooks Island. They're believed to prey on the northern alligator lizard (Elgaria coerulea) which lives around the island's ponds, as well as tree frogs and the ponds' population of introduced mosquitofish (Gambusia affinis). On one occasion a western pond turtle (Actinemys marmorata) was recorded.

=== Birds ===
More than 100 species of birds have been recorded on Brooks Island, and 18 species nest there.

==== Caspian terns ====
The island hosts the San Francisco Bay’s largest nesting colony of Caspian terns. The terns are relatively recent arrivals, first recorded in the south bay in 1922 and nesting on Brooks Island since around 1980. They now occupy much of the man-made sandspit that stretches 2 miles (3.2 km) west from the north side of the island. The terns feed on fish from areas around the Golden Gate and San Pablo Bay. However, the tern population has been decreasing, apparently due to reduced nesting area. The sandspit is being reduced by erosion from the bay waters, and also by the encroachment of invasive plants such as ice plant and marguerite daisies. The terns face strong competition at Brooks Island from a growing population of California gulls. The gulls "compete with the terns for nesting sites, steal fish from them, take their eggs, even chicks if they're small enough".

==== Other bird species ====
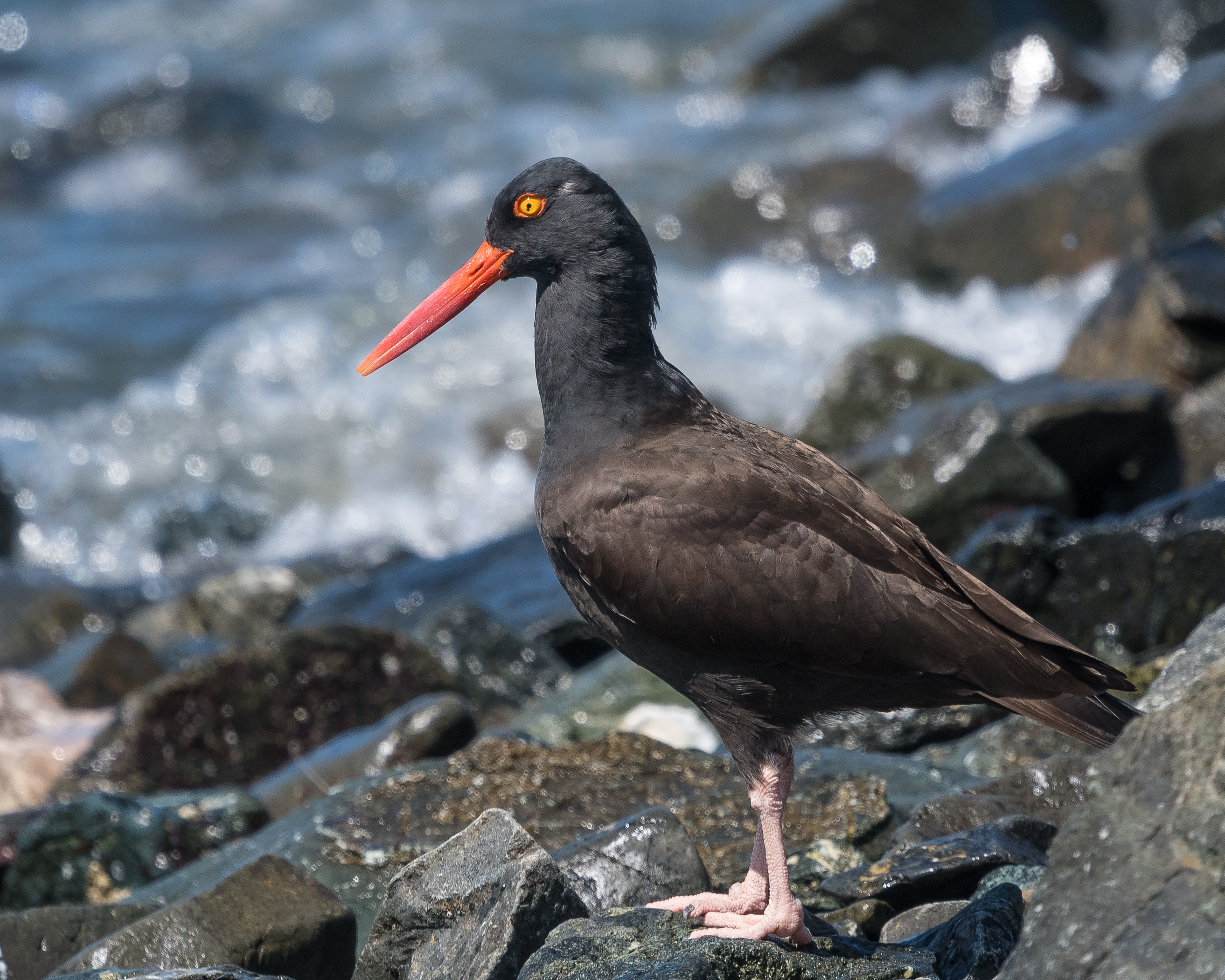
Black oystercatcher on southern shoreline of Brooks Island

Many other species of birds, both common and rare, use Brooks Island. The north-east shore hosts a large seasonal colony of herons and egrets.

To the immediate west, Bird Island is a nesting site for Canada geese (Branta canadensis), for which it was the first breeding location in the Bay Area, black oystercatchers (Haematopus bachmani), and western gulls (Larus occidentalis).

=== Insects ===
The persistence of many of the East Bay's native plants on Brooks Island provides rich habitat for insects. Ten percent of the 220 moth and butterfly species recorded on Brooks Island by UC Berkeley entomologist Jerry Powell and colleagues during the period 1993–1997 were either unknown in the San Francisco Bay region or unrecorded for 50 to 100 years. These included the Mexican tiger moth, not previously thought to occur in the Bay Area.

=== Flora ===
Because of its limited history of human exploitation, plant communities that are rare elsewhere in the East Bay remain on Brooks Island.

While Brooks Island has a variety of plant communities, the most common are coastal grassland and northern coastal scrub. It has been described as a "showcase for coastal grassland, which occurs on the island in a relatively undisturbed state", covering about 18 acres (7.3 ha) of mostly flatter terrain. These grassland areas are relatively free of exotic Mediterranean grasses and instead are dominated by needlegrasses (purple needlegrass (Nassella pulchra) and otherNassella spp.), ryegrasses (Lolium spp.) and fescues (Festuca spp.). Among the grasses are native wildflowers such as blue dicks (Dipterostemon capitatus), soap plant (Chlorogalum parviflorum) and checker mallow (Sidalcea malviflora).

Another notable relict population is the seaside woolly sunflower which is present in only a few other East Bay locations.

Overall, the diverse flora includes about 150 species of flowering plants, of which 92 are native species.

There are very few trees on the island: on the northeast side of the island near the shell middens are two clusters of old California buckeyes (Aesculus californica), a single red willow (Salix laevigata) and some blue elderberry (Sambucus mexicana). Around the two ponds in the quarry on the southern shore are several arroyo willows (Salix lasiolepis). A few non-native Monterey pine (Pinus radiata) and Monterey cypress (Cupressus macrocarpa) have also been planted near the caretaker's residence.

== See also ==
- Islands of San Francisco Bay
- San Francisco Bay Area

== Sources ==
- Ringgold, Cadwalader; Stuart, Fred D.; Everett, Chas.; Harrison (1850). "General Chart embracing Surveys of the Farallones Entrance to the Bay of San Francisco, Bays of San Francisco and San Pablo, Straits of Carquines and Suisun Bay, and the Sacramento and San Joaquin Rivers, to the Cities of Sacramento and San Joaquin, California". David Rumsey Map Collection. San Francisco Common Council.
- Eaton, Joe (April–June 2009), "A Refuge in the Harbor: Taking Your Tern on Brooks Island", Bay Nature
- EBRPD (February 17, 1976), Brooks Island Regional Shoreline: Resource Analysis
- EBRPD (September 10, 1985), Brooks Island Regional Shoreline: Final Land Use–Development Plan Environmental Impact Report
- EBRPD (June 1998), Brooks Island Regional Shoreline, East Bay Regional Parks District
- EBRPD, Brooks Island Regional Preserve, East Bay Regional Parks District, archived from the original on September 26, 2007
- Fredrickson, Vera-Mae (Summer 1977), "Painted Pebbles from a Shellmound on Brooks Island, Contra Costa County, California", The Journal of California Anthropology, 4 (1), Malki Museum, Inc.: 113–115, JSTOR 25748337
- Helm, J.M.; Capps, W.L.; Rousseau, H.H.; McElroy, G.W.; Hussey, C.L. (1917), Preliminary Report of the Navy Yard Commission, United States Congressional Serial Set, vol. 32 part 1, pp. 42–69
- Lidicker, W.Z. Jr. (1966), "Ecological observations on a feral house mouse population declining to extinction", Ecological Monographs, 36 (1): 27–50, doi:10.2307/1948487, JSTOR 1948487
- Lidicker, W.Z. Jr. (1973), "Regulation of numbers in an island population of the California Vole: A problem in community dynamics", Ecological Monographs, 43 (3): 271–302, doi:10.2307/1942343, JSTOR 1942343
- Lidicker, W.Z. Jr.; Anderson, P.K. (1962), "Colonization of an island by Microtus californicus, analyzed on the basis of runway transects", Journal of Animal Ecology, 31 (3): 503–517, doi:10.2307/2050, JSTOR 2050
- Powell, Jerry A. (June 2005), Lepidoptera (Butterflies and Moths) of Brooks Island, California (PDF), Essig Museum of Entomology, University of California, Berkeley
- Schoenherr, Allan A.; Feldmeth, C. Robert; Emerson, Michael J. (July 10, 2003), Natural History of the Islands of California, University of California Press, ISBN 9780520239180
- Tam, Katherine (May 14, 2011), "Off the Richmond shoreline, an 'island in time'", San Jose Mercury News
- Wichmann, Ray (December 2010), "A Unique View of the Bay", Bay Crossings
