= Louis Mackey (American football) =

American football player (born 1977)

No. 58, 57, 39
- Position: Linebacker

Personal information
- Born: December 29, 1977 (age 48); Richmond, California, U.S.
- Listed height: 6 ft 1 in (1.85 m)
- Listed weight: 225 lb (102 kg)

Career information
- High school: Albany (Albany, California)
- College: Akron
- NFL draft: 2001: undrafted

Career history
- Dallas Cowboys (2001–2002); Montreal Alouettes (2006–2007)

Career NFL statistics
- Games played: 16
- Total tackles: 12
- Fumbles recovered: 1
- Stats at Pro Football Reference

Career CFL statistics
- Games played–games started: 16–4
- Total tackles: 37
- Tackles for loss: 2
- Forced fumbles: 2
- Passes defended: 2

Louis Charles Mackey III (born December 29, 1977) is an American former professional football player who was a linebacker in the National Football League (NFL) and Canadian Football League (CFL). He played college football for the Akron Zips. After going undrafted in the 2001 NFL draft, Mackey played for the Dallas Cowboys of the NFL from 2001 to 2002. After a hiatus from football, Mackey returned to the game as a member of the Montreal Alouettes of the CFL from 2006 to 2007.

== Early life ==
Mackey attended Richmond High School during his first three years. He transferred to Albany High School as a senior, receiving All-conference honors at running back and linebacker. He qualified for the Meet of Champions with performances in the long jump and 4 × 400 metres relay.

He enrolled at Gavilan College, a junior college in Gilroy, California, where he played where strong safety and linebacker for the Gavilan Rams, earning all-conference honors in his two seasons. He transferred to the University of Akron for his junior season, appearing in 10 games (2 starts) at linebacker for the Akron Zips. He was suspended because of academic reasons in 1999.

As a senior, he posted 67 tackles (third on the team), 8 tackles for loss (tied for second on the team), one sack, 2 passes defensed and one forced fumble.

== Professional career ==
=== Dallas Cowboys ===
Mackey was signed as an undrafted free agent by the Dallas Cowboys after the 2001 NFL draft, following a rookie minicamp tryout on August 10. He was released before the season started and signed to the practice squad. He was promoted to the active roster on November 17. He played in only one game against the Philadelphia Eagles, before being placed on the injured reserve list with a fractured tibia plateau on November 21.

After being released on August 28, 2002, he was signed to the team's practice squad on September 11. On September 13, he was promoted to the active roster and would proceed to lead the team in special teams tackles with 18, while making 3 defensive tackles and one fumble recovery. He was waived on August 17, 2003.

=== Montreal Alouettes (CFL) ===
After working as a substitute teacher for three years, he attended a tryout and was signed as a free agent by the Montreal Alouettes in May 2006. Wearing jersey number 39, he appeared in 10 games, starting four and splitting time at middle linebacker with Dwayne Taylor, while registering 18 total tackles. In 2007, although he was initially released, he played in six games after being recalled on July 25 when Kai Ellis suffered a foot injury.
