= Ohlone Park =

Public linear park in Berkeley, California, U.S.

- Hearst Strip Park; Everybody's Park; People's Park Annex
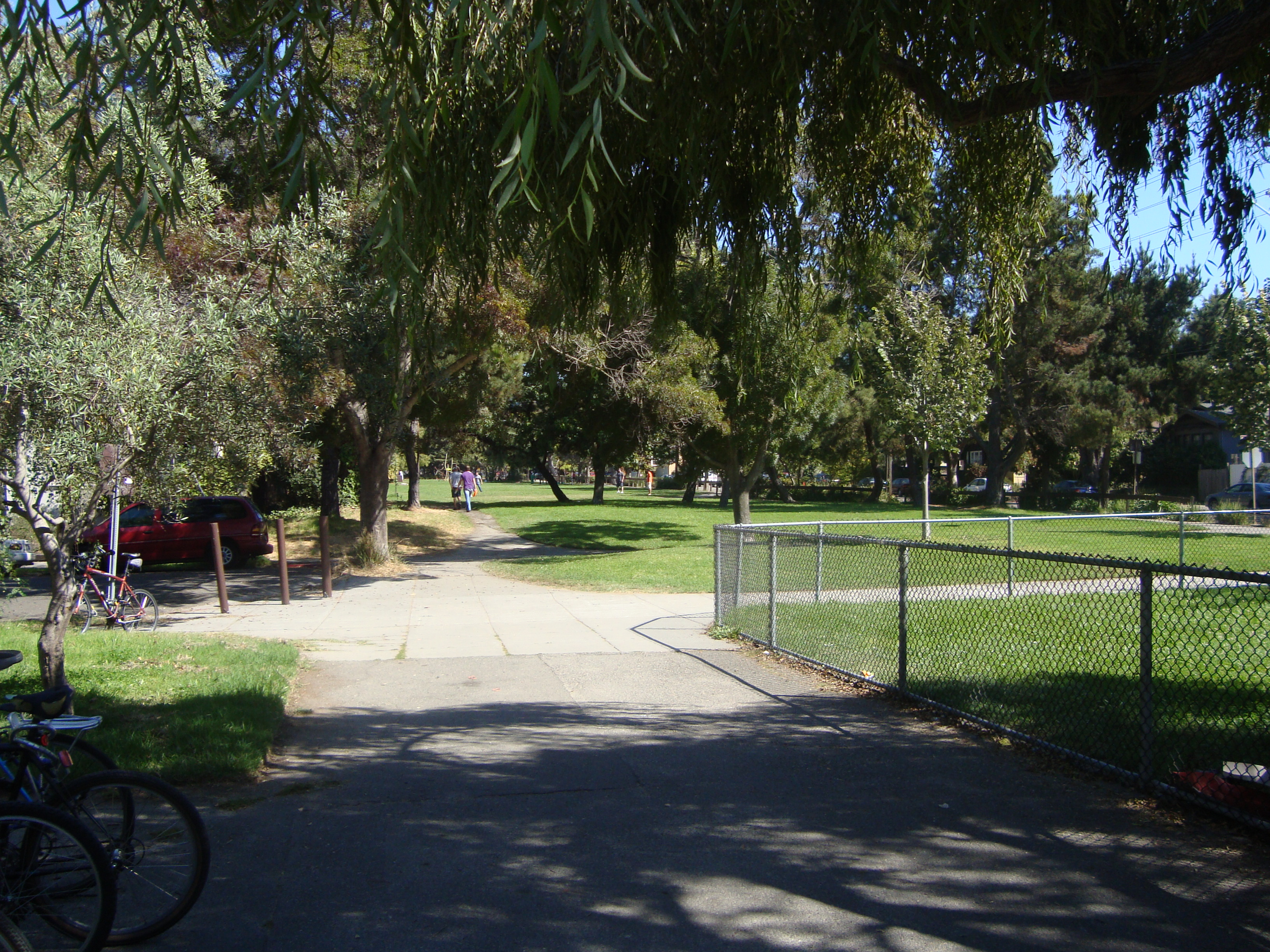
- Ohlone Park in September 2010.

- Location within Oakland, California Location within San Francisco Bay Area
- Nearest city: Berkeley, California, USA
- Coordinates: 37°52′22″N 122°16′40″W
- Area: 9.8 acres (4.0 ha)
- Open: 6 AM – 10 PM

Ohlone Park is a public linear park in the city of Berkeley, California, United States. Directly underground is the subway used by the Bay Area Rapid Transit (BART) Red Line and Orange Line. It is part of the Ohlone Greenway.

== Description ==
The park is divided into two pieces: the larger piece is a continuous strip of land approximately four blocks long, oriented east-west on the north side of Hearst Avenue, bounded by Sacramento (on the west) and Martin Luther King, Jr. (on the east). Three north-south streets dead end onto either side the larger part: California, McGee, and Grant. The smaller piece is approximately one block long, also oriented east-west along the north side of Hearst, bounded by Bonita (on the west) and Milvia (on the east). The park is just northwest of the main campus of the University of California at Berkeley.

It is mostly grass with a scattering of trees and includes pedestrian and bicycle paths, a dog park, a basketball court, and a small ball field. There are four play areas for children, two for school-age children at McGee and at Milvia, and two for toddlers at Bonita and at McGee.

The dog park, established in 1979 when the park was dedicated, is reported as one of the world's first off-leash dog parks. An official plaque by the City of Berkeley is dedicated to the dog park, calling it the world's first.

There is a mural depicting the history of the Ohlone people on the large concrete vent at Milvia, painted by Native American artist Jean Lamarr in the late 1990s.

== History ==
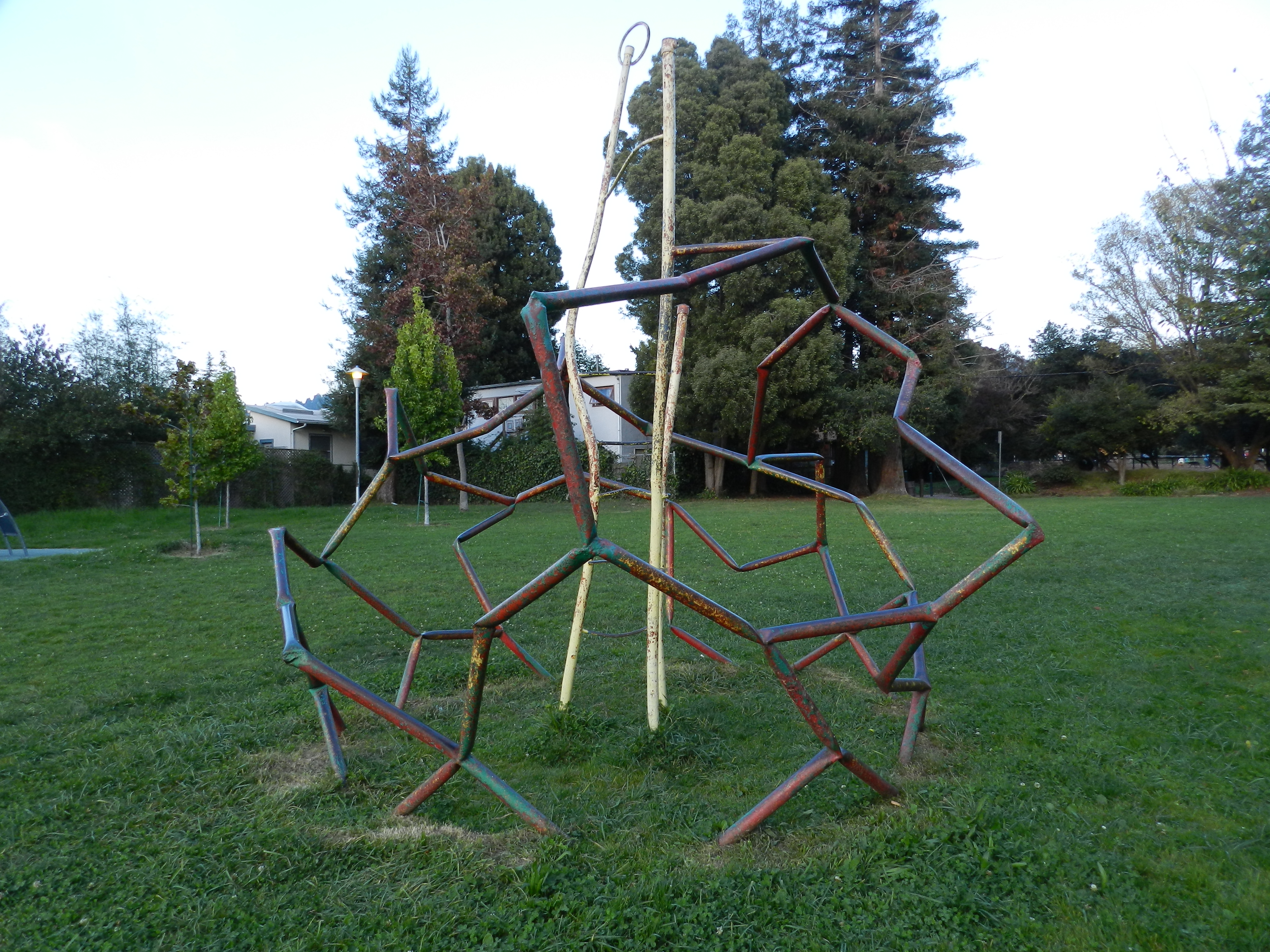
Jungle gym sculpture dating from the People's Park Annex (2011)

The park was created ad hoc by Berkeley citizens in connection with the People's Park controversy of the late 1960s. After Berkeley agreed to fund the cost to underground the BART lines through the city limits, the land, which was originally occupied by residences, was acquired then razed by BART during the cut-and-cover construction of its subway through Berkeley. After the trench for the subway was filled in, BART planned to construct apartment complexes on the strip. However, after the May 1969 protests and "Bloody Thursday" event over the People's Park site south of the main campus of UC-Berkeley, Berkeley citizens began planting sod and trees on the vacant strip and dubbed it "People's Park Annex".

Although the Annex was the starting point for a protest march on May 31, 1969 and camps there were raided a week later, it was largely ignored by activists after the summer of 1969. After much haggling and public discussion, BART agreed to turn the Hearst strip over to the City of Berkeley, leasing the land for one dollar per year. The preservation of the park land and its formal name, "Ohlone Park" after the name of the local indigenous people, is credited to the efforts of a local couple, Alex and Martha Nicoloff. The park was dedicated on June 7, 1979.

The non-profit Ohlone Dog Park Association (ODPA) was formed in 1983 to maintain the off-leash area, which is dedicated for Martha Scott Benedict, the leader of the ODPA founders.
