= Berkeley Partners for Parks =

Berkeley Partners for Parks (BPFP) is a nonprofit organization, made up of volunteers, whose mission is to "build vibrant, healthy, ecologically sound communities by providing the infrastructure that volunteer groups need in order to improve the beauty and usefulness of public space and recreation in and around Berkeley, California."

BPFP encourages volunteerism and community development for parks, community gardens, natural habitat, and open space, and recreation. BPFP helps citizens form new groups, helps those groups find needed financial and volunteer resources, provides voices of experience and help with publicity, and serves as a 501(c)3 nonprofit fiscal sponsor, providing bookkeeping, tax filing, insurance, and the ability to receive tax-free donations and grants.

Partner groups include Friends of Five Creeks, Berkeley Path Wanderers Association, Friends of Halcyon Commons, and Schoolhouse Creek Common. These groups do such things as restore creeks, build paths and steps, remove invasives, plant natives and drought-tolerant landscaping, raise money for recreation, install public art and interpretive signs, and create new public parks such as Halcyon Commons.
