= Albany High School (California) =

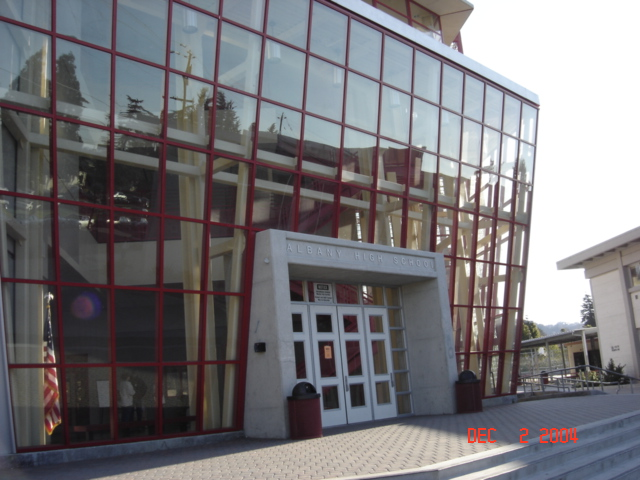
- Current building, December 2004

Location
- 603 Key Route Boulevard; Albany, Alameda County, California 94706; United States; 37.895890°N 122.292421°W

Information
- Type: Public high school
- Established: 1934
- School district: Albany Unified School District
- Principal: Darren McNally
- Staff: 61.41 (FTE)
- Grades: 9-12
- Enrollment: 1,117 (2023–2024)
- Student to teacher ratio: 18.19
- Campus: Semi-urban
- Colors: Red and white
- Mascot: Cougar
- Newspaper: The Cougar
- Yearbook: The Middle Mile
- Feeder schools: Albany Middle School
- Website: ahs.ausdk12.org

Albany High School (AHS) is a comprehensive public high school in Albany, California in the San Francisco Bay Area. Enrollment is approximately 1,300 students from grades 9 through 12.

== Achievements ==
Albany was first accredited by the Western Association of Schools and Colleges in 1965. Albany High School was #559 nationally ranked in 2025, and #76 among California high schools. In 2013 Albany High School received an award for Distinction in Civic Learning from the California Courts. Associate Justice Carole Corrigan of the California Supreme Court presented the Award which honored the work of the social studies department and student clubs such as the Model United Nations program. In 2024, NBC Sports Bay Area and Provident Credit Union announced "Profe" Pamela Lim-McAlister, as the grand prize winner of the 2024 All-Star Teacher Award, receiving the grand prize of $30,000 for the school.

== Academic competitions ==
In the 2010–2011 academic year, Albany became home to a forensic (Speech and Debate) team. The Albany High School Speech and Debate team is a member of the Golden Gate Speech Association and the National Forensic League.

== Music programs ==
The Albany High School Jazz Band, under the direction of Craig Bryant, was selected as a finalist for the 2010 Next Generation Festival, presented by the Monterey Jazz Festival, and the 2010 Essentially Ellington Festival, presented by Jazz at Lincoln Center in New York, New York.

== STEM programs ==
Albany High School has many competing STEM teams, including Science Bowl, National Ocean Science Bowl, and Science Olympiad.

Since it was founded at Albany Middle School (Division B) in 2013, Albany's Science Olympiad has qualified for state 4 times. In 2017 and 2018, the Albany High School Science Olympiad (Division C) team won first place in the Bay Area Regional Science Olympiad, and placed 5th and 3rd overall respectively at State.

The Science Bowl team won the 1993 Department of Energy National Science Bowl competition. Albany High won its 2008 Science Bowl regional competition, defeating academic rival Mission San Jose High School. In 2009, Albany won its regional National Science Bowl competition, placing fifth nationwide.

In 2016, Albany went to North Carolina for Nationals, where it won first place in the 2016 Department of Commerce National Ocean Sciences Bowl competition. In 2019, Albany took home a second national championship in Washington, D.C., going undefeated in both the buzzer portion and the Scientific Expert Briefing portion of the competition.

== Advanced Placement (AP) course offering ==
Subject	Name	Notes
Arts	Studio Art	
Language	AP English Literature	
Language	AP French	
Language	AP Spanish	
Language	AP Chinese	
Math	Statistics	
Math	Calculus AB	
Math	Calculus BC	*has AB subscore
Sciences	Computer Science Principles	
Sciences	Computer Science A	
Sciences	Biology	
Sciences	Chemistry	
Sciences	Physics C	
Social studies	AP Environmental Science	
Social studies	Comparative Gov't	
Social studies	African American Studies	

== Athletics ==
View of Cougar Field in use by Albany Middle School students during the school day, taken from the BART.

The school mascot is the cougar and the school colors are red and white. The school's athletic track and field (Cougar Field) is located on the Albany Middle School campus. In February 2014, the girls' wrestling team took first place at the CIF State tournament. In November 2021 Sophia Nordenholz won the individual Division IV State Cross-Country Championship with the 7th fastest time in state meet history. At the same meet the boys' team won the Division IV State Championship, with Sean Morello taking 3rd place and Lucas Cohen taking 13th. In May 2023 Sean Morello took 7th in the 3200 meter race in the State Track and Field Championships and Lucas Cohen took 9th in the 1600 meters. In June 2026, the Albany High School ultimate frisbee team capped off a historic undefeated season with a final record of 35–0 by winning the High School National Invite in Salem, Oregon. They defeated Green Canyon High School, Utah, by a final score of 13–12.

== Campus history ==
A view of the Albany High School main building in the background of the outdoor pool of the Albany Aquatic Center. The center is owned and operated by the Albany Unified School District.

In 1997, Albany High School's main building and gymnasium, both completed in 1934, were deemed to be seismically unsound. They were demolished, and construction began on a new campus. During the four years of construction, between 1997 and 2001, classes were held in portable trailers. The new school building and gymnasium opened in 2001. In 2020, a new addition was opened on the campus, including 8 large classrooms and a future design-build space. The current campus sits next to the Albany Memorial Park, and the Albany Aquatic Center (owned by the Albany Unified School District). The school's athletic track and field (Cougar Field) is located on the Albany Middle School campus, which is approximately two blocks away from the AHS campus, and is adjacent to the Ohlone Greenway and BART track. Students can commute to and from the El Cerrito Plaza BART Station via the Ohlone Greenway to reach Albany Middle School.

=== Instagram controversy ===
In fall of 2016 an Albany High student started an Instagram account on which he posted unauthorized photos of Black classmates along with the word nigger and images evoking lynchings. By March 2017, the account became public knowledge at the school, causing disruption. The student who posted the content was expelled from the school; additionally, all students who had followed the account were suspended for five days, the maximum allowed under California law, including three students who had never liked any of the content or indicated any approval of it. In the weeks following the suspension of students, there was a community rally and a student sit-in protesting racism at the school. One of these protests was held in April, at the same time and place as a voluntary mediation session between the suspended students and the affected Black classmates. The mediation was scheduled by the district at the end of the suspensions, because the suspended students would have to return to school. What began as a quiet protest by uninvolved students ended in a melee as police attempted to escort the students and their parents off campus after the mediation session, during which student protesters threw things at and hit the students.

The next month, ten Albany High students filed suit against the school arguing that they had been punished unfairly for their involvement with the Instagram account. The students and their lawyers claimed that the school had violated their First Amendment rights by punishing them for actions that took place outside of school grounds and outside of school hours. The lower court ruled in favor of five of the ten students in November 2017. Eight of the ten ultimately settled their claims with the school, provoking distress in the victims' families. Two appealed their claims to the Ninth Circuit Court of Appeals. In December 2022, the Ninth Circuit Court ruled unanimously in favor of the school district, saying that the Instagram account amounted to "severe bullying" and "contributed nothing to the 'market of ideas'." The last lawsuit against the district was resolved in 2023, in the district's favor. Additionally, one of the students who was victimized in the account filed a lawsuit against the account creator and two other students who had been significantly involved, which eventually settled for a cash payment in late 2020.

== Neighborhoods zoned to Albany ==
The entire city of Albany is zoned to this school. The University Village development, a student housing complex of the University of California Berkeley which houses families, is assigned to this school.

== Notable alumni ==
- Tim Armstrong, 1984 - punk rock, musician, singer and guitarist for Operation Ivy and Rancid
- Rick "Grizzly" Brown, 1978 - former professional strongman; competed in World's Strongest Man competitions in 1985 (6th) and 1986 (8th)
- Jordan Capozzi, 2008 - rapper who is known by her stage name Lil Debbie
- John Crewdson, 1963 - Pulitzer Prize-winning journalist and author
- Matt Freeman, 1984 - bass guitar player for Operation Ivy and Rancid
- DeVon Franklin, 1996 - Preacher, Television Personality
- Edi Gathegi, 1997 - actor; House MD, Twilight
- Tyson Griffin, 2002 - professional MMA fighter, formerly with the UFC
- Matt Haney, 1982 - politician
- Ron Hansen, 1956 - Major League Baseball player; 1960 American League Rookie of the Year; one of the few players in history to turn an unassisted triple play, July 30, 1968
- Louis A. Mackey - NFL football player
- Lil B The BasedGod, 2005 - former member of The Pack rap group, real name Brandon McCartney
- Sho Nakamori, attended – Artistic gymnast and member of the United States men's national artistic gymnastics team
- Young L, 2005 - member of The Pack rap group, real name Lloyd Omadhebo
- Ron Silliman, 1964 - poet and author
- Kellita Smith, 1986 - actress, The Bernie Mac Show
- Jim Thiebaud, 1983 - skateboarder, co-founder of Real Skateboards
- Warren Thomas, 1977 - comedian; winner of the 1987 San Francisco International Comedy Competition; writer for TV show In Living Color
- Amani Toomer - NFL football player (attended AHS for one year before transferring to De La Salle in Concord)

== See also ==
- Albany Unified School District
- Mahanoy Area School District v. B.L. – Supreme Court case affirming that schools can discipline students for social media posts made off campus, if the contents disrupt the school
