= Cerrito Creek =

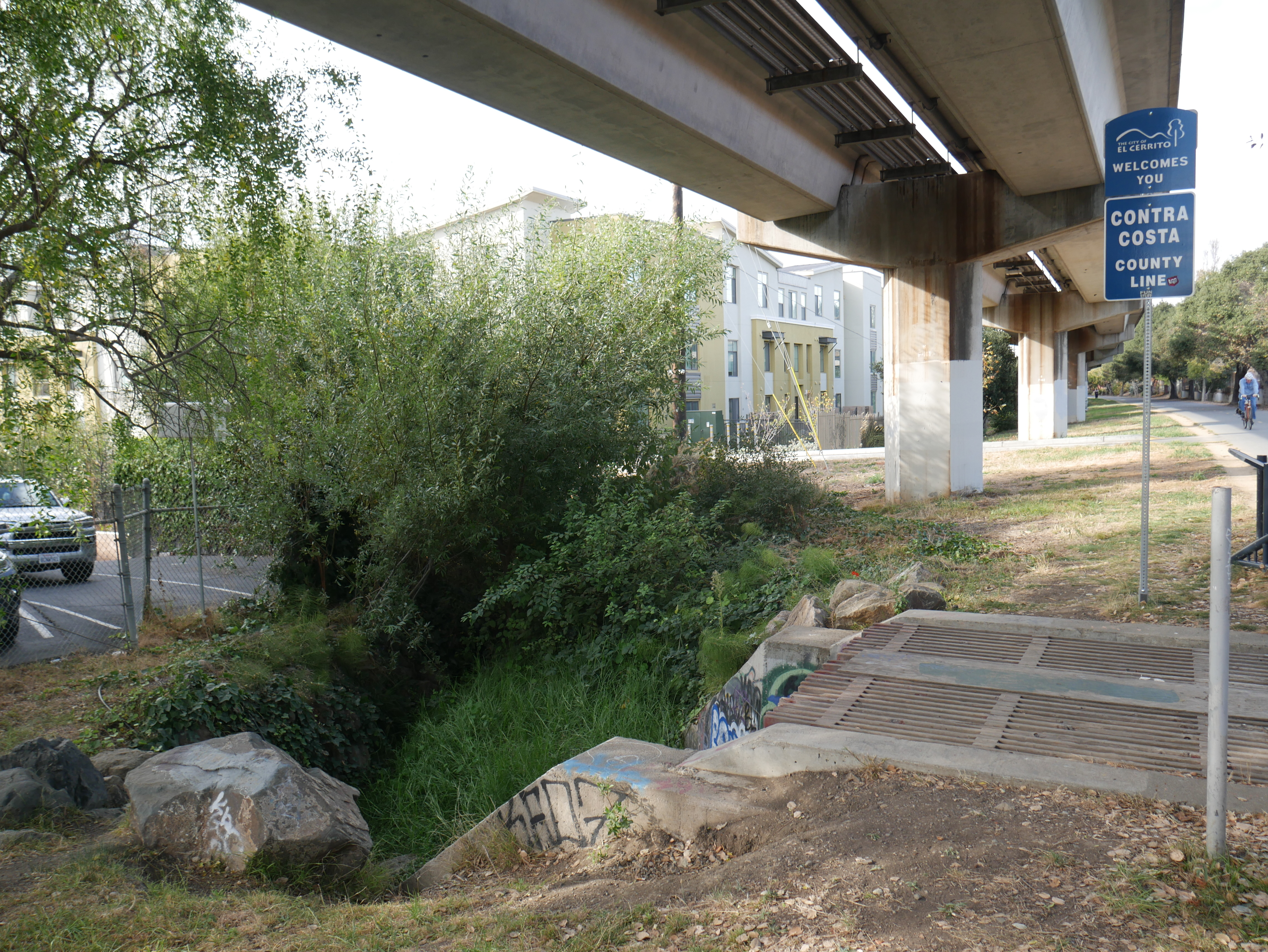
- Cerrito Creek passing under Ohlone Greenway and BART tracks

- Location of the mouth of Cerrito Creek in California
- Etymology: "cerrito", Spanish for little hill, referring to Albany Hill]

Location
- Country: United States
- State: California
- Region: Contra Costa County, Alameda County
- Cities: Albany, El Cerrito, Berkeley, Kensington, Richmond

Physical characteristics
- Source: Berkeley Hills
  - location: above Arlington Avenue, Berkeley
  - coordinates: 37°54′7″N 122°16′34″W
  - elevation: 500 ft (150 m)
- 2nd source: Berkeley Hills
  - location: above Arlington Avenue, Kensington
- Mouth: San Francisco Bay
  - location: south of Pt. Isabel, north of Albany Hill Richmond
  - coordinates: 37°53′49″N 122°18′43″W
  - elevation: 0 ft (0 m)
- Length: 2 mi (3.2 km)

Basin features
- Tributaries
  - left: North Fork Cerrito Creek (California), Unnamed creeks north of Fairmount Ave. (California)
  - right: Middle/Blackberry

Cerrito Creek is one of the principal watercourses running out of the Berkeley Hills into San Francisco Bay in northern California. It is significant for its use as a boundary demarcation historically, as well as presently. In the early 19th century, it separated the vast Rancho San Antonio to the south from the Castro family's Rancho San Pablo to the north. Today, it marks part of the boundary between Alameda County and Contra Costa County. The main stem, running through a deep canyon that separates Berkeley from Kensington, is joined below San Pablo Avenue by a fan of tributaries, their lower reaches mostly in culverts. The largest of these is Middle or Blackberry Creek, a southern branch.

The creek is named for Albany Hill, formerly called Cerrito de San Antonio, a prominent (elevation 294 ft.) isolated hill on the shoreline of San Francisco Bay in Albany (The hill is now some distance inland due to Bay fill). Cerrito Creek, joined by a fan of other small creeks, formerly meandered to the Bay through a large marsh just north of the hill.

== History ==
The creek played a part in history larger than its size. Because it divided the two land-grant ranches, it became the division between Alameda and Contra Costa counties. With Alameda County settled more densely in the early 20th-century boom that followed the San Francisco earthquake, the area just north of the county line became the home of jazz joints, gambling, brothels and other pursuits requiring a light hand from the law. This lasted until a post–World War II reform movement in the City of El Cerrito.

The marsh at the creek's mouth also played a curious bit part in history. Regarding such wetlands as useless, 19th- and 20th-century settlers set out to fill it, locating a slaughterhouse and dump there. An early 20th-century typhoid scare, however, led to closing of the dump. This left Berkeley, booming with new residents after the great San Francisco earthquake, without a place for its garbage. A new dump south of the hill was quickly arranged, in what is now the City of Albany. Women of that unincorporated area were upset, but they lacked the vote. One morning, they sought to turn back the garbage wagon with guns. Although they gave up when the sheriff ordered them to disperse, male residents who had formerly resisted incorporation then quickly voted to incorporate the city of Ocean View—soon renamed Albany to avoid confusion with the Oceanview district of Berkeley.

The marsh was eventually filled—rubble from dynamite making and quarrying on Albany Hill contributed. The creek was confined to a small channel, and in 1969 the City of El Cerrito built flood basins north of the creek in Creekside Park, a new park created as part of renewing the down-at-heel, flood-prone neighborhood that had grown up in the filled marsh. In 1953, the head of Stege Sanitary District wrote, "As late as 1920, records show a small lake bordered by marsh south of 'County Road No. 4' now Central, near Belmont. Nothing appears to justify use of this area for dwellings; and, the character of construction permitted in the past has involved a succession of unwise buyers of homes in losses and disappointments only partly compensated by sale to some newer victim."

Tides still rise and fall inland as far as Albany's and El Cerrito's Creekside Parks, respectively south and north of the creek. When a high tide coincides with winter storm runoff (greatly increased by the city's impermeable surfaces), the former marsh area can flood.

== Restoration ==
Unsuccessful efforts to bring a portion of the creek out of a pipe when a former lumberyard became Albany Middle School in the 1990s led indirectly to the formation of Friends of Five Creeks, a citizens group. Volunteers with this group have worked since 1996 on this and other local creeks, principally removing invasives, planting natives, and installing amenities including signs and benches.

The City of El Cerrito is committed to a long-term plan to "daylight" the still-culverted reaches of the creek at the south edge of El Cerrito Plaza, between San Pablo Avenue and the Ohlone Greenway (regional pedestrian/bicycle route under the BART tracks). The cities of Albany and El Cerrito have adopted a long-term plan for a pedestrian-bicycle route mostly along the creek, connecting the Ohlone Greenway to the Bay Trail. This plan is gradually being carried out.

Friends of Five Creeks established some natives and placed a litter can at the short reach exposed at the Ohlone Greenway, but these plantings have repeatedly been devastated by maintenance workers. Between Talbot and Kains, adjacent to the El Cerrito Plaza shopping center, a state grant to the City of El Cerrito led to the channelized creek being re-contoured in 2003, giving it a more natural flow pattern, native vegetation, and a creekside trail. This project, maintained and improved by Friends of Five Creeks, has been successful.

The channelized south bank between San Pablo Avenue and Pierce Street was "torn up" by a sewer replacement project in 1998–99 Pierce Street. As part of that project, the Urban Creeks Council was instrumental in having the old sewer pipe broken up so that steelhead could again access Middle Creek. (These anadromous fish have been observed in the creek but there is no evidence of recent successful reproduction.) The City of Albany used mitigation funds to establish native vegetation on the north bank, but the project was rapidly re-invaded by invasives such as blackberry, Cape ivy, and morning glory when that money ran out.

Friends of Five Creeks began intensive work between San Pablo and Pierce in 2000, beginning on the north bank at Pacific East Mall, carrying out restoration required in the mall's use permit. Tasks included removing fencing, building a creekside trail, removing evergreen thornless blackberries that formed thickets more than 10 feet (3.0 m) high and spanned the creek, and establishing native vegetation. This revegetation has been reasonably successful, although the mall's maintenance contractors sprayed much of the grassland areas with herbicide, and these native grasses have never been re-established. The mall was required to re-plant shrubs, carry out long-promised pollution reduction, and improve its maintenance as a result of this incident.

Since 2004, Friends of Five Creeks volunteers have focused on the reach from Adams Street downstream to Pierce Street. The largest task continues to be removing evergreen thornless blackberry, which quickly clogs the creek and increases flooding. With help from both cities, volunteers also have removed other invasives, planted natives, and installed amenities such as benches, signs, and a table in the Creekside Parks facing each other in Albany and El Cerrito. Parkland extends to most of Albany Hill, with grasslands, a willow grove at the mouth of Middle Creek, and mature oak forest on the steep north face of the hill. Thus this complex is an unusual island of urban green space and habitat surrounded by city. Wildlife includes sticklebacks, Pacific chorus frogs, herons, egrets, kingfishers, ducks, hawks, raccoons, and deer.

== See also ==
- Baxter Creek
- Codornices Creek
- Fluvius Innominatus (Central Creek)
- List of watercourses in the San Francisco Bay Area
