= Albany Unified School District =

School district in California, United States

Address
- 1216 Solano Avenue Albany, California, 94706; United States

District information
- Grades: K-12
- Superintendent: Sara Stone
- Schools: 6

Students and staff
- Enrollment: 3 501 (2020-21)
- Teachers: 166.07 (on an FTE basis)
- Staff: 303.65 (FTE)
- Student–teacher ratio: 21.08

Other information
- Website: www.ausdk12.org

Albany Unified School District includes seven schools in Albany, California, United States.

== History ==
The school district was founded in February 1908 with students initially attending school in a converted barn on Brighton street. In December 1908, the district completed construction of its first building, Albany School, on Solano Avenue between Cornell and Talbot. Albany built its first high school in the 1930s. In 1944, the Federal Housing Authority built Codornices Elementary School for children of war workers living in Codornices Village. The current middle school opened in 1999 on the site of a former lumberyard. The current high school building opened in 2001.

== Demographics ==
Albany schools served 3501 students in the 2020-21 school year. In recent years enrollment fell—the 2015-16 enrollment was 3822. The 2010-11 enrollment was 3879.

In 2020-21 the student body was quite diverse with reported race/ethnicity of 1058 Asian, 1043 White, 591 Hispanic or Latino, 501 two or more races, 189 None Reported, 135 Black or African American.

In 2018-19, there were 202 teachers with reported race/ethnicity of 17 Asian, 142 White, 14 Hispanic or Latino, 5 two or more races, 13 None Reported, 8 Black or African American and 2 American Indian/Alaskan Native.

== AUSD schools ==
- Albany Children's Center (Preschool, Transitional Kindergarten, Before/After school care) - Director Position Open
- Cornell Elementary School (TK-5th), Principal Jen Corn
- Marin Elementary School (K-5th), Principal Melisa Pfohl
- Ocean View Elementary School (K-5th), Principal Michelle Sinclair
- Albany Middle School (6th-8th), Principal Eric Mapes
- Albany High School (9th-12th) Principal Darren McNally
- MacGregor High School Principal Darren McNally

=== Former schools ===
- Albany School
- Albany Adult School (closed 2012)
- Codornices Elementary
- Herbert Hoover Junior High School

== Governance ==
The district is governed by a 7 member school board made up of 5 voting members and 2 student members.

The central office for 2022-23 contains 8 executive positions.

== Budget ==
The district budget in 2020-2021 was approximately $32,000,000.

In 2001, the district's financial reserve fell below state requirements and the county board of education appointed a fiscal advisor to monitor the district. District income is primarily based on average daily attendance, and in 2002, the district accepted out of district residents in order to increase the income to the district. By the end of 2003, the district received a positive budget certification. In 2006, the district put limitations on out of district transfers.

== Northern Regional Special Education Local Plan Area(SELPA) ==
Albany Unified participates in the Northern Region SELPA which provides special education services to students in 5 member districts, Albany, Berkeley, Emeryville, Alameda and Piedmont.
