= Ohlone Greenway =

Pedestrian and bicycle path in the East Bay, California, U.S.

Coordinates: 37.90431°N 122.30019°W

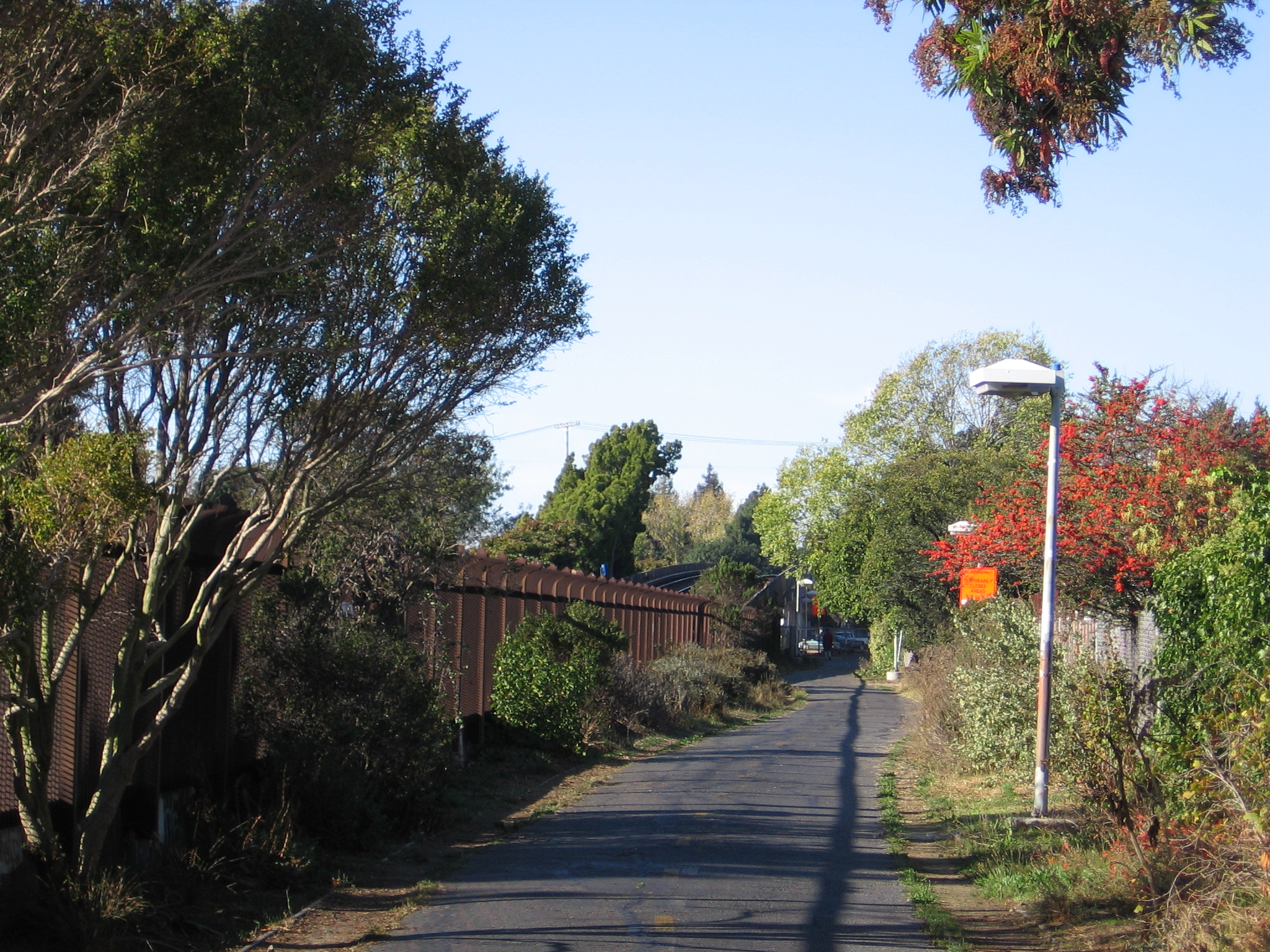
- Ohlone Greenway near the BART portal
- Location: East Bay region of the San Francisco Bay Area, California, USA
- Use: pedestrian and bicycle

The Ohlone Greenway is a 4.5-mile (7.2 km) pedestrian and bicycle path in the East Bay region of the San Francisco Bay Area. The path is named for the Native American Ohlone, who live in the area.

== Route ==
The Greenway begins in Berkeley at the east end of Ohlone Park located at Martin Luther King Jr. Way and Hearst Avenue. From there, it runs westward to the west end of the park at Sacramento and Delaware. In the segment around the North Berkeley BART Station (one block west on Delaware to Acton, then one block north on Acton to Virginia), the bike path becomes a street-running bike lane.

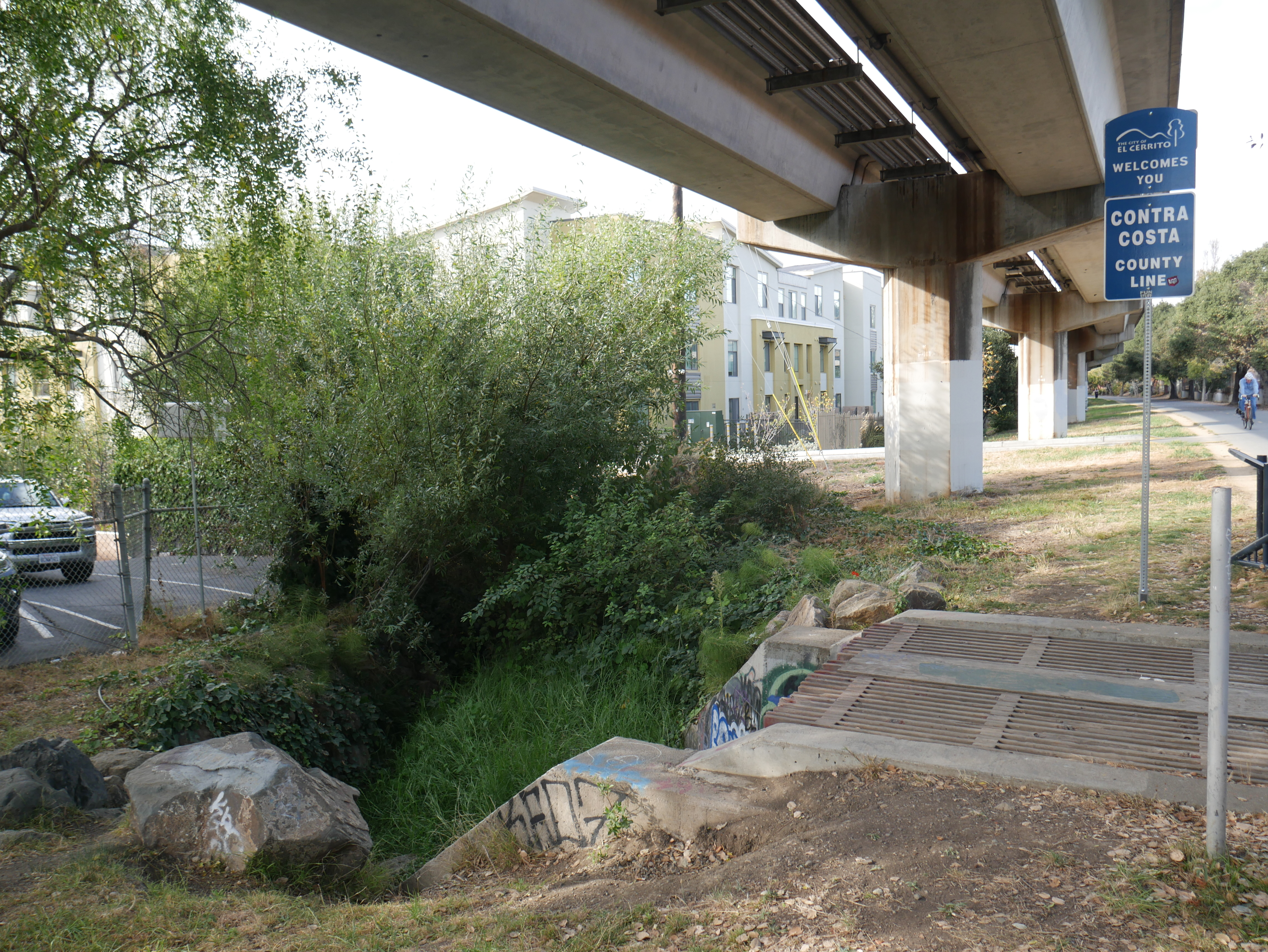
The Cerrito Creek passes under Ohlone Greenway and BART line, forming the border of Alameda and Contra Costa counties.

At Virginia, the path resumes its own dedicated course just northwest of the North Berkeley BART station and runs northwestward through the cities of Albany, and El Cerrito. It terminates at San Pablo Avenue at Baxter Creek Gateway Park in Richmond at the eastern end of the Richmond Greenway.

== History ==
For most of its length, the Ohlone Greenway runs along what was formerly a railroad right of way, and alongside the elevated tracks of the BART Richmond line. For most of this stretch, the Greenway is divided into two paths, one for pedestrians, the other for bicyclists. The segment from the North Berkeley BART station to Rose Street in north Berkeley was formerly the right of way of the Key System's "G" Westbrae line. The segment from Rose to just north of the El Cerrito del Norte BART station was formerly the right of way of the Santa Fe Railroad (and originally, of the California and Nevada Railroad). BART began revenue operation along the elevated tracks on January 29, 1973 and the last Santa Fe run over the route was on May 12, 1979, meaning it was possible to see both a BART train and a Santa Fe freight train alongside each other (the BART train above on the overhead elevated tracks) in the right of way which became the Ohlone Greenway. The "linear park" was constructed in conjunction with BART, and received federal funds for landscaping and beautification. The initial 2.7 miles (4.3 km) was funded by a $400,000 federal grant.

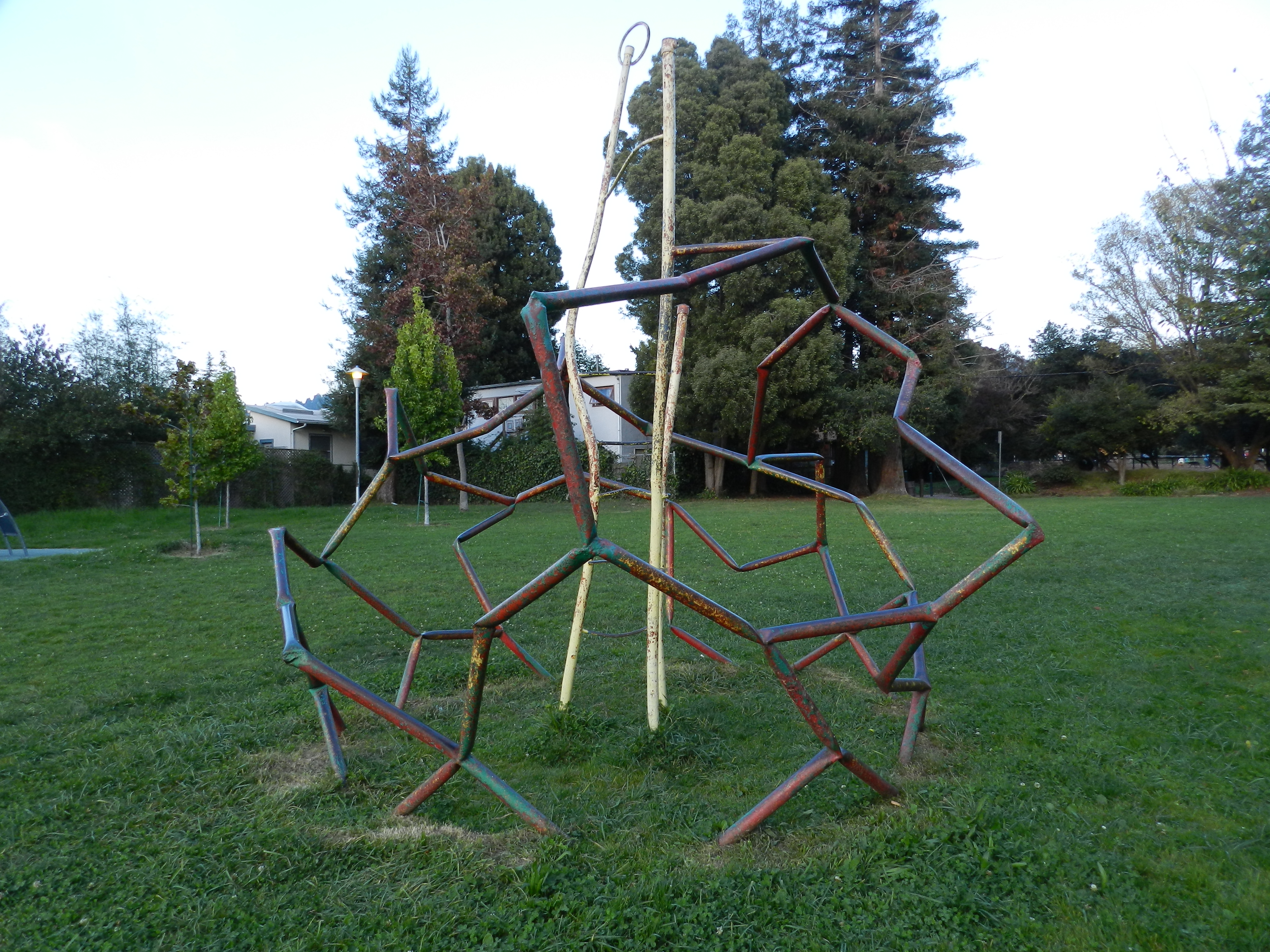
Public sculpture along the Greenway dating from the People's Park annex period, demolished in the 21st century

In late 2006, a portion of what will eventually become a branch of the Ohlone Greenway in Berkeley south to University Avenue using another segment of the old Santa Fe right-of-way was opened between University and Delaware. In November 2007, the City of Berkeley approved the use of the old Santa Fe right-of-way south of University, extending the Ohlone Greenway branch about two blocks to Strawberry Creek Park. The last segment between Cedar Rose Park and Delaware remained an undeveloped dirt right-of-way blocked by a fence at Cedar until late 2010 when construction began to close this gap. It was opened in late 2012.

Portions of the Greenway were closed to the public from 2011 to 2014, due to a seismic retrofit project to strengthen the elevated BART tracks. The project was completed in January 2014.

The link extending the Greenway west from the terminus at Baxter Creek to unite with the new Richmond Greenway, which runs along the abandoned former Santa Fe Railroad right of way to Point Richmond, was completed in 2018.

In 2023, planning was initiated for an Ohlone Greenway Safety Improvements Project. The project will implement changes, detailed in the 2023 plan, to The Greenway from Santa fe Avenue to Virginia Gardens, with a planned construction start date of mid-2025 and planned closure of the section between Cedar Street and Virginia Gardens between July 6 and July 31, 2026

== California native plant habitat ==
A section of the Ohlone Greenway has been rewilded with native grassland plants creating a habitat corridor that provides native plant habitat for butterflies, bees, and birds. Native plant restoration focusing on a coastal prairie habitat was completed in 2002. For over 20 years, as of 2026, the section of the greenway between Gilman and Peralta Street has been stewarded by community gardeners that are committed to California native plants and the pollinators they support. Between Santa Fe Avenue and Hopkins Street pollinator plants, flowers, and trees are also tended by community volunteers in three gardens extending this corridor.

== See also ==
- Rail trail
