= Baxter Creek =

Coordinates: 37.90856°N 122.33034°W

Baxter Creek Stege Creek
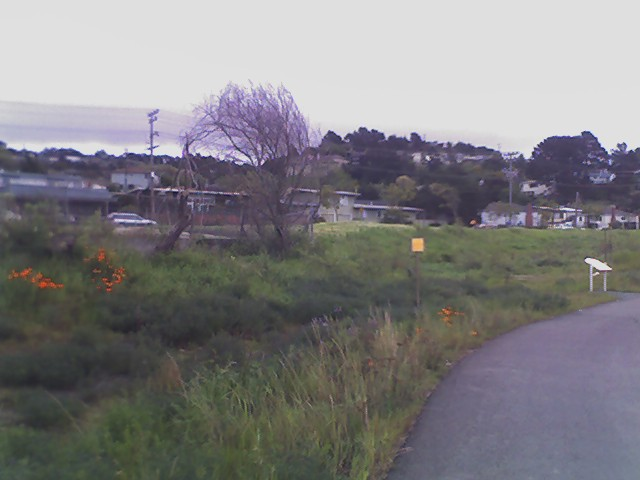
- The Northern terminus of the Ohlone Greenway trail at Baxter Creek Gateway Park, 1980

- Location of the mouth of Baxter Creek in California

Location
- Country: United States
- State: California
- Region: Contra Costa County
- City: Richmond, El Cerrito

Physical characteristics
- Source: The Presidio
  - location: Berkeley Hills
- Mouth: Stege Marsh, San Francisco Bay
  - location: Richmond, California
  - elevation: 0 ft (0 m)

Baxter Creek or Stege Creek (also archaically Bishop Creek), is a three-branch creek in Richmond and El Cerrito, California, United States, forming the Baxter Creek watershed. The creek has three sources and flows from the Berkeley Hills to Stege Marsh and the San Francisco Bay. The Baxter Creek watershed at-large has 10 sources.

The creek has been largely culverted over the years since the Rancho San Pablo and the subdivided Bishop Ranch, then known as Bishop Creek, were urbanized. Residents missed the creek when it disappeared under the asphalt and formed Friends of Baxter Creek. This group has aided in the restoration of several portions of the creek. Baxter Creek Park, Poinsett Park, and Booker T. Anderson Park are now in a more natural riparian condition, though the Anderson Park portion has been plagued by litter and shopping carts.

The Ohlone Greenway bicycle and pedestrian path has its northern terminus at Baxter Creek Gateway Park, located just north of where the BART tracks cross over San Pablo Avenue in Richmond.

The origins of the name Baxter Creek is unknown, but historians believe it to be from a family which once owned land in the area. Stege is from Richard Stege and Bishop comes from Thomas Bishop, who once owned large tracts of land in the area.

Much of the streamside vegetation that had been restored to Booker T. Anderson Park was chainsawed away and leveled due to concerns that the riparian habitat hid muggings, drug dealings, and public sex from police patrols.

== See also ==
- Cerrito Creek
- List of watercourses in the San Francisco Bay Area
- Richmond Greenway
