= Albany, California =

City in California, United States

- City
- View of Albany on Solano Avenue, during the Solano Stroll

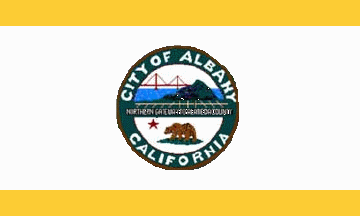
- Flag Seal
- Motto: Urban Village by the Bay
- Albany in Alameda County, California
- Interactive map of Albany, California
- Location in California Albany, California (the United States) Albany, California (North America)
- Coordinates: 37°53′13″N 122°17′52″W
- Country: United States
- State: California
- County: Alameda
- Incorporated: September 22, 1908

Government
  - Mayor: Peggy McQuaid
  - State Senate: Jesse Arreguín (D)
  - State Assembly: Buffy Wicks (D)

Area
  - Total: 5.47 sq mi (14.16 km^{2})
  - Land: 1.79 sq mi (4.64 km^{2})
  - Water: 3.68 sq mi (9.52 km^{2}) 67.28%
- Elevation: 43 ft (13 m)

Population (2020)
  - Total: 20,271
  - Density: 11,324.7/sq mi (4,372.49/km^{2})
- Demonym: Albanian
- Time zone: UTC−8 (PST)
  - Summer (DST): UTC−7 (PDT)
- ZIP Codes: 94706, 94707, 94710
- Area codes: 510, 341
- FIPS code: 06-00674
- GNIS feature IDs: 1657902, 2409674
- Website: www.albanyca.gov

Albany (/ˈɑːlbəni/ AWL-bə-nee) is a city on the east shore of the San Francisco Bay in northwestern Alameda County, California, United States. The population was 20,271 at the 2020 United States census.

== History ==
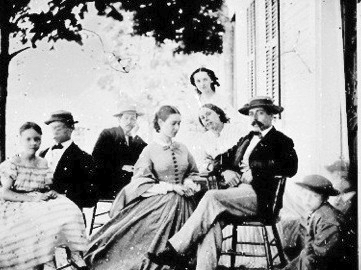
Albany and much of the East Bay was part of Rancho San Antonio, granted to the Peralta family in 1820.

The first known residents were the Ohlone before Spanish settlement in the early 19th century.

In 1908, a group of local women protested the dumping of Berkeley garbage in their community. Armed with two shotguns and a twenty-two-caliber rifle, they confronted the drivers of the wagons near what is now the corner of San Pablo Avenue and Buchanan Street. The women told the drivers of the horse-drawn garbage wagons to go home, which they did quickly and without complaint. Shortly thereafter, the residents of the town voted to incorporate as the City of Ocean View.

In 1909, voters changed the name of the city, primarily to distinguish the city from the adjacent section of Berkeley which had previously been named Ocean View. On a vote of 38 to 6 the city was renamed in honor of Albany, New York, the birthplace of the city's first mayor, Frank Roberts.

The Albany Sauna is one of the oldest Finnish-style saunas open to the public in North America. Built in 1934 by Finnish-American Henry Walter Lundgren (a founding member of the Finnish Lodge in West Berkeley), the original furnace and rooms have been maintained.

Albany has a history of real estate discrimination, which made it difficult for non-white buyers to acquire property and build or rent homes in Albany.

== Geography ==
According to the United States Census Bureau, the city has a total area of 5.5 square miles (14 km^{2}), of which 1.8 square miles (4.7 km^{2}) is land and 3.7 square miles (9.6 km^{2}) (67.28%) is water.

The principal shopping street in Albany is Solano Avenue, which cuts across the city from west to east. Another important street is San Pablo Avenue, which travels from north to south.

Albany is a small city located on the eastern shore of San Francisco Bay, bordering the city of Berkeley to the south and east, and the Contra Costa County cities of El Cerrito and Richmond to the north. Albany's northern and southern borders are defined by two creeks, Codornices Creek on the south and Cerrito Creek on the north. Cerrito Creek takes its name from "El Cerrito de San Antonio," now known as Albany Hill. The hill's unusual location near the bay shore makes it a prominent landmark in the East Bay. The rest of the city is relatively flat by Bay Area standards, except for a small area near the base of the Berkeley Hills.

Albany's waterfront has undergone significant man-made changes; the most prominent landform is now the Albany Bulb, a former garbage landfill jutting out into San Francisco Bay. The bulb was the site of a small art colony and shanty town until it was cleared to turn the area into part of the new Eastshore State Park.

University Village, a housing unit of the University of California Berkeley, is located in Albany.

== Demographics ==
Historical population
Census	Pop.	Note	%±
1910	808		—
1920	2,462		204.7%
1930	8,569		248.1%
1940	11,493		34.1%
1950	17,590		53.0%
1960	14,804		−15.8%
1970	15,561		5.1%
1980	15,130		−2.8%
1990	16,327		7.9%
2000	16,444		0.7%
2010	18,539		12.7%
2020	20,271		9.3%
2025 (est.)	19,195	▼	−5.3%
U.S. Decennial Census; 1860–1870 1880-1890; 1900 1910 1920; 1930 1940 1950; 1960 1970 1980; 1990 2000 2010; 2020

=== 2020 census ===
As of the 2020 census, Albany had a population of 20,271 and a population density of 11,324.6 inhabitants per square mile (4,372.5/km^{2}). 93.1% of residents lived in households, 6.8% lived in non-institutionalized group quarters, and 0.0% were institutionalized.

The median age was 36.3 years; 21.6% of residents were under the age of 18, 11.7% were aged 18 to 24, 28.6% were aged 25 to 44, 23.0% were aged 45 to 64, and 15.0% were 65 years of age or older. For every 100 females there were 91.0 males, and for every 100 females age 18 and over there were 86.9 males age 18 and over.

100.0% of residents lived in urban areas, while 0.0% lived in rural areas.

There were 7,493 households, of which 38.4% had children under the age of 18 living in them. Of all households, 52.4% were married-couple households, 6.7% were cohabiting couple households, 14.2% were households with a male householder and no spouse or partner present, and 26.7% were households with a female householder and no spouse or partner present. About 22.9% of all households were made up of individuals, 11.3% had someone living alone who was 65 years of age or older, and the average household size was 2.52. There were 5,126 families (68.4% of all households).

There were 7,907 housing units at an average density of 4,417.3 per square mile (1,705.5/km^{2}); 7,493 (94.8%) were occupied, of which 48.9% were owner-occupied and 51.1% were occupied by renters. The homeowner vacancy rate was 0.9% and the rental vacancy rate was 4.6%.

Racial composition as of the 2020 census
Race	Number	Percent
White	9,446	46.6%
Black or African American	716	3.5%
American Indian and Alaska Native	90	0.4%
Asian	6,184	30.5%
Native Hawaiian and Other Pacific Islander	17	0.1%
Some other race	1,131	5.6%
Two or more races	2,687	13.3%
Hispanic or Latino (of any race)	2,665	13.1%

=== 2023 American Community Survey ===
In 2023, the US Census Bureau estimated that 26.1% of the population were foreign-born. Of all people aged 5 or older, 62.5% spoke only English at home, 7.9% spoke Spanish, 7.9% spoke other Indo-European languages, 21.3% spoke Asian or Pacific Islander languages, and 0.4% spoke other languages. Of those aged 25 or older, 97.4% were high school graduates and 76.4% had a bachelor's degree.

The median household income was $135,927, and the per capita income was $72,518. About 6.1% of families and 8.2% of the population were below the poverty line.

=== Historical demographics ===
Through the early 1940s Albany "remained closed to African Americans." The Black population of Albany in 1940 was three persons. Between 1950 and 1960, the Black population of Albany fell 95% from 1778 to 75.

== Transportation ==
Albany is served by AC Transit, BART (North Berkeley, El Cerrito Plaza), and bus shuttles operated by Lawrence Berkeley National Laboratory. Interstate 80 and Interstate 580 runs along the bay shoreline, with access to local Albany via Buchanan street. San Pablo Avenue, managed by Caltrans, is the primary arterial roadway running from north to south through Albany, parallel to the San Francisco Bay. Other notable roadways in Albany include Solano Avenue, the city's primary commercial street, and Marin Avenue, both of which run from east to west. West of San Pablo Avenue, Marin Avenue continues on to Interstate 80 as Buchanan street.

=== Active Transportation in Albany ===
The Ohlone Greenway, a mixed use pedestrian and cycling facility, runs north and south through Albany from El Cerrito Plaza towards North Berkeley BART station. Many streets in Albany have been treated with fixtures that support the safety and comfort of pedestrians and cyclists, such as Curb extensions, Pedestrian islands, Raised crosswalks, and Bicycle boulevards with traffic diversion features. A local nonprofit, Albany Strollers & Rollers has donated a number of bicycle parking racks around Albany, and frequently advises the city on its active transportation plan. As of April 2025, the city is in the process of updating its active transportation plan, which was last updated in 2019.

== Economy ==
The major retail and business areas in Albany are Solano Avenue, which is a pedestrian-oriented street lined with mainly small shops, restaurants, and services; San Pablo Avenue, which is more automobile-oriented; and an area near the Eastshore Freeway.

In 2006 voters approved of measure D which allows one medical cannabis dispensary in the town in addition to measure C to build a new emergency operations center with "sustainable features", an addition to the civic center of Albany.

Albany is the site of Golden Gate Fields, which was the only horse racing track in the Bay Area until it closed in June 2024.

Real estate prices have been rising steeply in recent years. The median price of a single family home and condo in Census 2000, June 2007, November 2009, July 2011, August 2013 and August 2014 were $334,800, $687,500, $610,000, $590,000, $625,750 and $820,050 respectively.

== Politics ==
United States presidential election results for Albany, California
Year	Republican		Democratic		Third party(ies)	
Year	No.	%	No.	%	No.	%
2000	936	12.34%	5,892	77.68%	757	9.98%
2004	868	10.69%	7,134	87.84%	120	1.48%
2008	839	9.55%	7,767	88.42%	178	2.03%
2012	712	8.42%	7,447	88.06%	298	3.52%
2016	587	6.36%	8,128	88.04%	517	5.60%
2020	808	7.59%	9,639	90.54%	199	1.87%
2024	842	8.68%	8,439	87.04%	414	4.27%

According to the California Secretary of State, as of February 10, 2019, Albany has 11,344 registered voters. Of those, 7,489 (66%) are registered Democrats, 512 (4.5%) are registered Republicans, and 2,917 (25.7%) have declined to state a political party.

In 1966, Albany was home to a John Birch Society bookstore known as the American Opinion Library. On July 30, 1968, the John Birch Society's Truth About Civil Turmoil (TACT) committee hosted an event at the Albany Veterans Memorial Building which included a speech by a former klansman, Delmar Dennis.

In recognition of Ohlone land, a permanent flag acknowledging the Ohlone people was flown above Albany City Hall in October 2021.

On March 26, 2024, the Albany City Council passed a resolution supporting an immediate ceasefire in Gaza.

On December 9, 2024, the city of Albany appointed their first ever Latino Mayor, Robin Lopez, who also happens to be a Doctoral Candidate at UC Berkeley in Environmental Science. The city of Albany conducts what is known as a rotating mayorship of elected council members. Previously, Robin Lopez served as the Vice Mayor of Albany, under past Mayor John Miki. Robin Lopez and John Miki campaigned together in 2022, when both were elected to city council. In that same year, a vacant council seat was filled by Jennifer Hansen-Romero.

== Top employers ==
According to Albany's 2025 Comprehensive Annual Financial Report, the top employers in the city were:

#	Employer	# of Employees
1	Albany Unified School District	405
2	United States Department of Agriculture	340
3	Target*	218
4	Sutter East Bay Medical Foundation	165
5	City of Albany	106
6	Sprouts Farmers Market*	80
7	St. Mary's College High School	79
8	Albany Ford Subaru	71
9	Safeway*	69
10	Tilden Preparatory School	40

Note: * Full-time and part-time employees

== Education ==
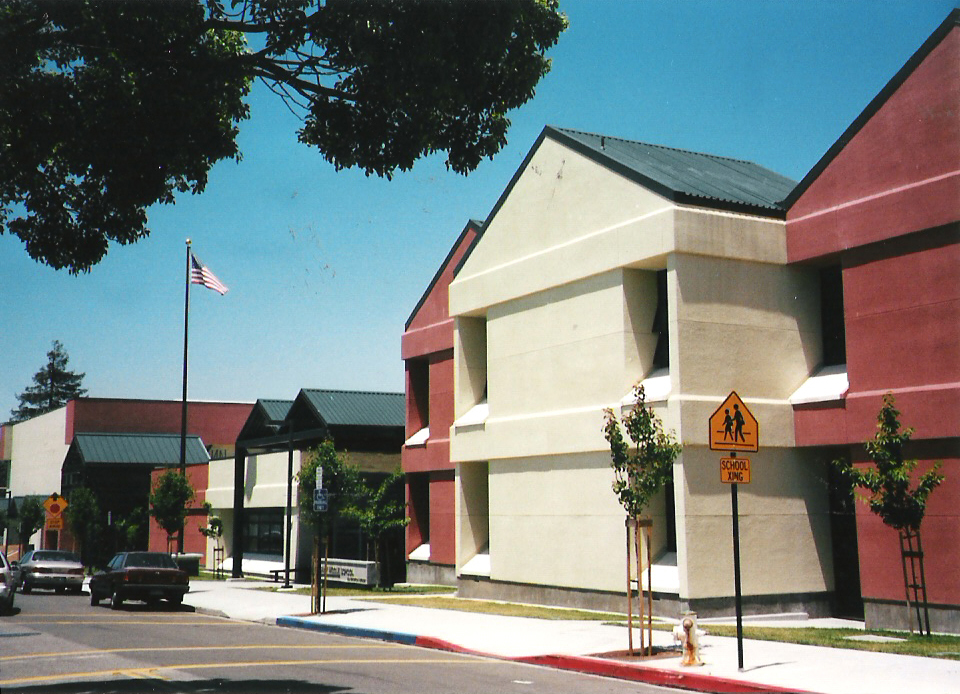
Albany Middle School, 2000

Public schools in Albany are operated by the Albany Unified School District, a special-purpose district whose borders match the city's. The school district operates three elementary schools (Marin Elementary School, Ocean View Elementary School and Cornell Elementary School), one middle school (Albany Middle School), one traditional high school (Albany High School), and one continuation high school (MacGregor High School), in addition to the Albany Children's Center. Albany High School is known as one of the best public schools of the San Francisco Bay Area for its academic excellence. The high school had a graduation rate of 92.1%, according to the 2009–10 School Accountability Report Card for the prior academic year.

There are two private high schools in Albany: Tilden Preparatory School (formerly School for Independent Learners) on Solano Avenue and St. Mary's College High School, whose campus straddles the border with Berkeley, CA.

The University of California, Berkeley owns a large student housing complex in Albany, University Village, which is primarily used for family housing.

== Arts, culture, and recreation ==
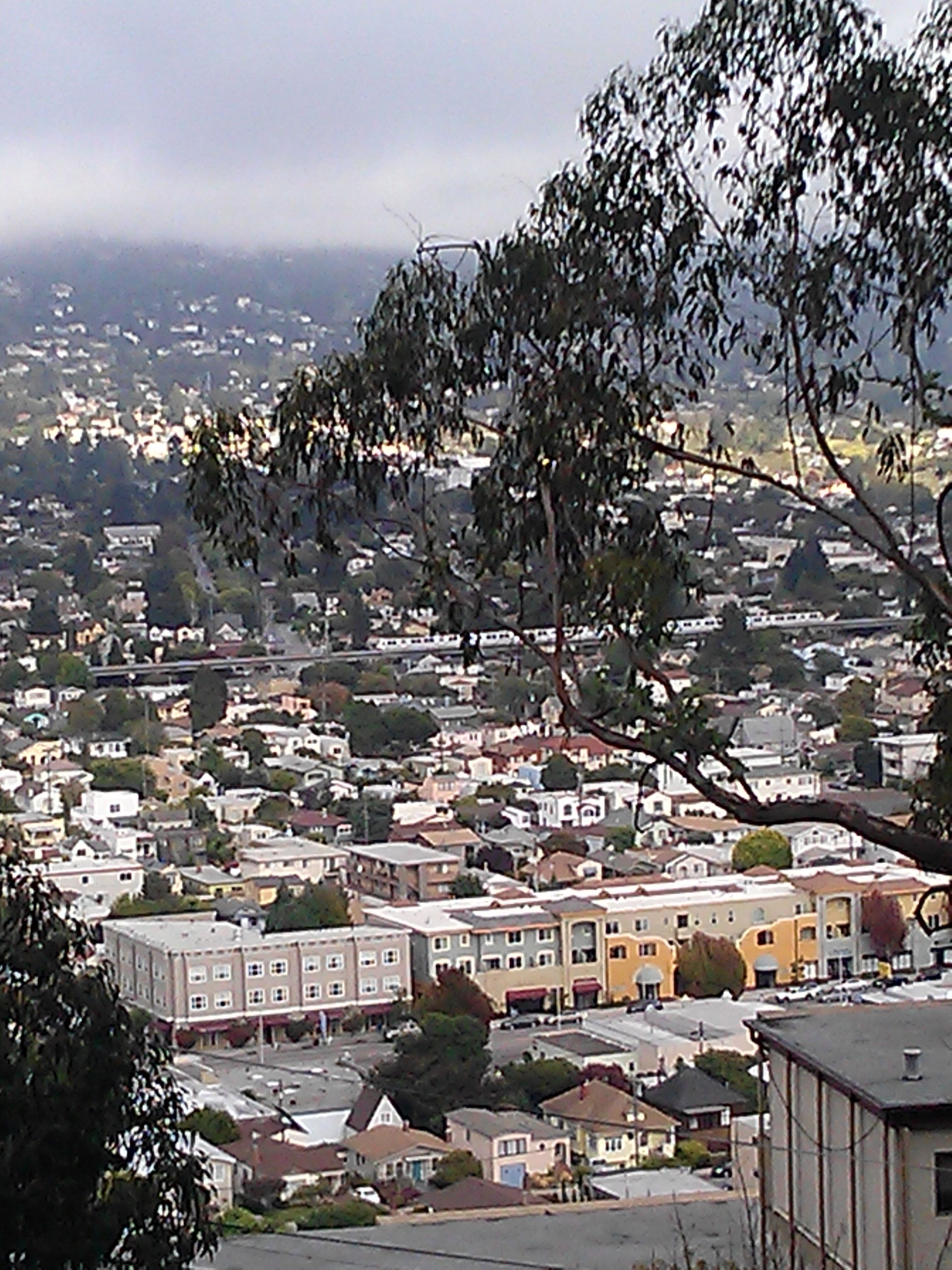
Midtown Albany

The Solano Avenue Stroll, an annual street festival held on Solano Avenue in Albany and Berkeley, attracts more than 250,000 visitors on the second Sunday of September. The event was started in 1975 by The Iris store owner and Solano Avenue Association founder Ira Klein as a "thank you party" from Solano Avenue business owners to customers. The Library of Congress designated the Solano Stroll as a "National Local Legacy" in 2001.

Albany has both the locale and the title for one of the best-known poems in language poetry, by former long-time Albany resident, poet Ron Silliman.

Albany is home to the now closed Golden Gate Fields as well as the Eastshore State Park which skirts the San Francisco Bay, and the Albany Bulb.

Albany has a school music program. High school music groups, both instrumental and choral, have performed at the CMEA, Reno Jazz, and other festivals. The Albany High School Jazz Band was also accepted at the Essentially Ellington festival at the Lincoln Center in 2010. Albany was one of 15 schools accepted into the festival.

Albany Strollers & Rollers is a volunteer group dedicated to service and advocacy for bicycling and walking.

Friends of Five Creeks is an all-volunteer group working hands-on for clean water and healthy watersheds.

The Albany Community Center was designed by architect Robert Marquis and opened in 1994. It houses the Albany Public Library on one side and the Community Center on the other, and is host to many different community events and cultural activities.

== Notable people ==
- Tim Armstrong, musician and lead singer of Rancid and Operation Ivy
- Anna Baltzer, activist
- T. J. Cloutier, professional poker player and Hall of Famer
- Walter De Maria (1935 - 2013), sculptor
- Daveed Diggs, actor, rapper, singer-songwriter, attended elementary and middle school in Albany
- DeVon Franklin, film producer, author
- Matt Freeman, musician and bassist of Rancid and Operation Ivy
- Edith Frost, musician
- William Francis Ganong Jr. (1924 - 2007), physiologist, died in Albany
- Edi Gathegi, actor
- Tyson Griffin, UFC fighter
- Matt Haney, politician
- Ron Hansen, former Major League Baseball player
- Lil B, rapper, artist
- Lil Debbie, rapper, artist
- Alysa Liu, champion figure skater, graduated Ocean View Elementary and resided in Albany prior to her family's move to Richmond
- Ann Richards (1935 - 1982), singer
- Dave Rude, musician
- Ron Silliman, poet
- Angel Tompkins, actress

== See also ==
- Albany Hill
- Gill Tract
- Marin Creek
