= Daylighting (streams) =

Restoring covered streams to more natural conditions

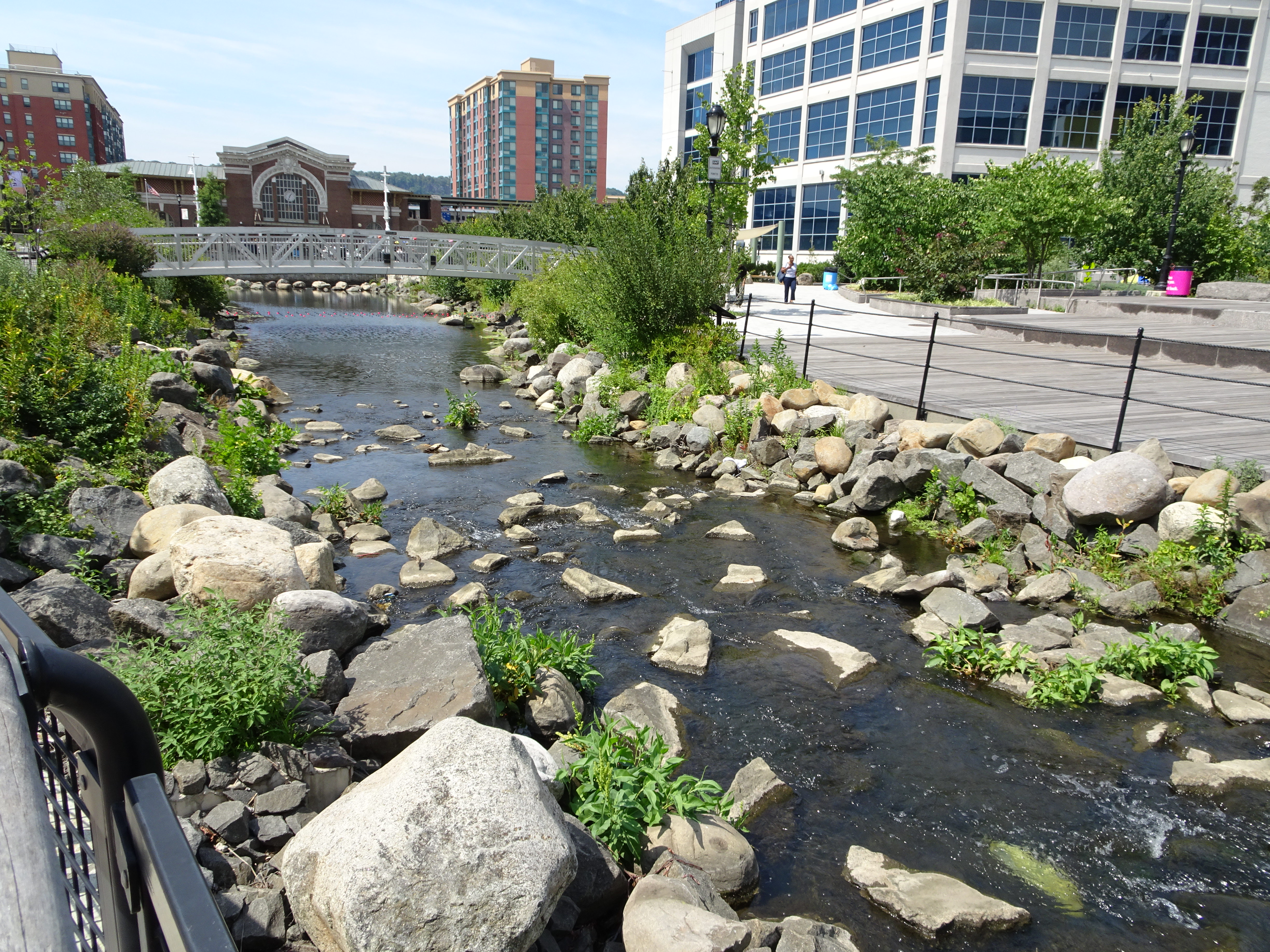
The daylighted Saw Mill River in Getty Square, Yonkers, New York, had been covered by a parking lot.

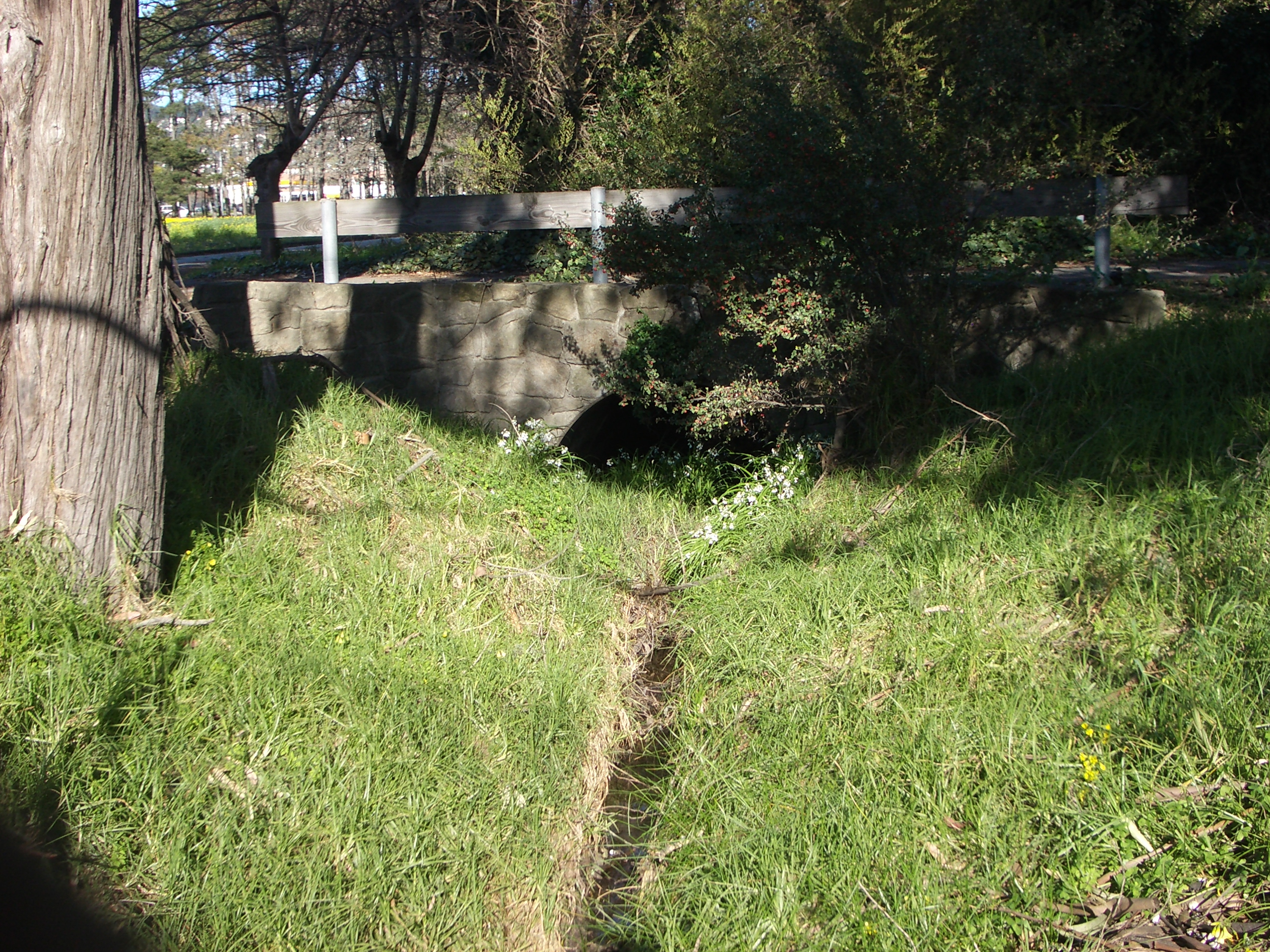
A short stretch of Lower Marin Creek in UC Village in Albany, California, has been daylighted.

Daylighting is the opening up and restoration of a previously buried watercourse, one which had at some point been diverted below ground. Typically, the rationale behind returning the riparian environment of a stream, wash, or river to a more natural above-ground state is to reduce runoff, create habitat for species in need of it, or improve an area's aesthetics. In the United Kingdom, the practice is also known as deculverting.

In addition to its use in urban design and planning the term also refers to the public process of advancing such projects. According to the Planning and Development Department of the City of Berkeley, "A general consensus has developed that protecting and restoring natural creeks' functions is achievable over time in an urban environment while recognizing the importance of property rights."

== Systems ==
=== Natural drainage systems ===
Natural drainage systems help manage stormwater by infiltrating and slowing the flow of stormwater, filtering and bioremediating pollutants by soils and plants, reducing impervious surfaces, using porous paving, increasing vegetation, and improving related pedestrian amenities. Natural features—open, vegetated swales, stormwater cascades, and small wetland ponds—mimic the functions of nature lost to urbanization. At the heart are plants, trees, and the deep, healthy soils that support them. All three combine to form a "living infrastructure" that, unlike pipes and vaults, increase in functional value over time.

Some efforts to blend urban development with natural systems use innovative drainage design and landscaping instead of traditional curbs and gutters, pipes and vaults. One such demonstration project in the Pipers Creek watershed reduced imperviousness by more than 18 percent. The project built bioswales, landscape elements intended to remove silt and pollution from surface runoff water and planted 100 evergreen trees and 1,100 shrubs. From 2001 to 2003, the project reduced the volume of stormwater leaving the street in a two-year storm event by 98%. Such a reduction can reduce storm damage to water quality and habitats for species such as the iconic salmon. Unfortunately, the engineering alternatives have a relatively expensive initial price, since they are usually replacing existing structures, albeit life-limited ones. Further, conventional systems generally do not consider full cost accounting. The natural drainage system alternatives can also provide returns on investment by improving urban environments.

The street edge alternatives street breaks most of the conventions of 150 years of standard American street design. Narrow, curved streets, open drainage swales, and an abundance of diverse plants and trees welcome pedestrians as well as diverse species. Adjacent residents maintain city infrastructure in the form of street "gardens" in front of their homes, visually integrating the neighborhood along the street. The natural drainage system united the community visually, environmentally, and socially. The 110th Cascades SEA (2002–2003) are a creek-like cascade of stair-stepped natural, seasonal pools that intercept, infiltrate, slow and filter over 21 acres (85,000 m^{2}) of stormwater draining through the project.

== Example projects ==
Viable, daylighted streams exist only where neighbourhoods are intimately connected to restoration and stewardship values in their watersheds, since the health of an urban stream can not long survive carelessness or neglect. With impervious surfaces having replaced most of the natural ground cover in urban environments, habitat for wildlife is dramatically reduced compared to historic baselines. Hydrologic changes have resulted, and impervious waterways directly carry non-point pollution through urban creeks. One effective solution is to restore streams and riparian habitat. This improves the entire urban watershed, far beyond the riparian channel itself. Wild et al 2011 described the first known online map and database of urban river daylighting projects. Wild et al 2019 published a geo-spatial database about all schemes. University of Waterloo documented a very similar list featuring many of the same stream daylighting projects around the globe.

=== Canada ===
==== Vancouver, British Columbia ====
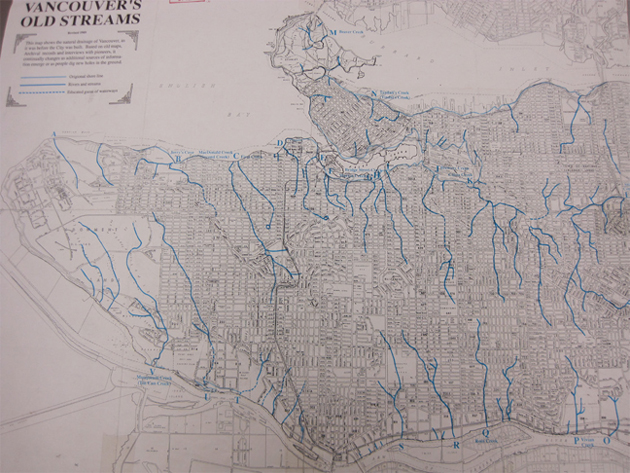
The historic stream network in Vancouver, B.C.

In the 1880s there were over 50 wild salmon streams in Vancouver alone. However, as Vancouver grew, these streams were lost to urbanization. They were covered by roads, homes, and businesses. They were also lost when they were buried beneath sewers or culverts.

The City of Vancouver and its residents are now making an effort to uncover these lost streams and restore them back to their natural state.

===== Hastings Creek =====
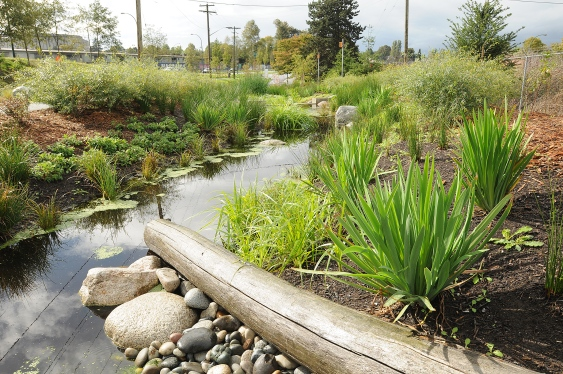
Hastings Creek restored at Creekway Park, Vancouver, B.C.

The Hastings Creek Stream Daylighting Project was originally proposed in 1994 as a way to manage storm water and for aesthetic purposes. The idea was to bring the stream back to its once natural formation which would improve the surrounding habitat for wildlife as well as the originally proposed purposes. This project's plan was finalized in 1997, and work began the same year.

The stream had existed in Hastings Park until 1935 when the Park became focused on entertainment rather than its original purpose when it was given to the city in 1889, which was to be a retreat for those with a passion for the outdoors. As the Pacific National Exhibition (PNE) grounds continued to expand there was a continued loss of natural woodlands, greenery and waterways. It was not until the 1980s when the surrounding community began to look at continuing to uphold its original purpose.

The daylighting project made major progress in 2013 in the area located in the Creekway Park, which was originally a parking lot. The daylighted stream will one day connect the Sanctuary in Hastings Park to the Burrard Inlet. The progress made in Creekway Park is a major step towards this goal. This daylighting project also improved pedestrian and bikeway transit. This stream is now able to obtain the stormwater from the surrounding area, which reduces the load that is felt by the municipality's storm sewers. It is the storms in early autumn which provide the water flow for the creek, meaning that there is variable flow throughout the year. During the late summer months the moist soil is relied upon to maintain the vegetation of the area. This variation in flow does not allow for salmon migration through the creek; however it does house trout as well as vegetation which aid in the filtration of the storm water entering the creek.

===== Spanish Banks =====
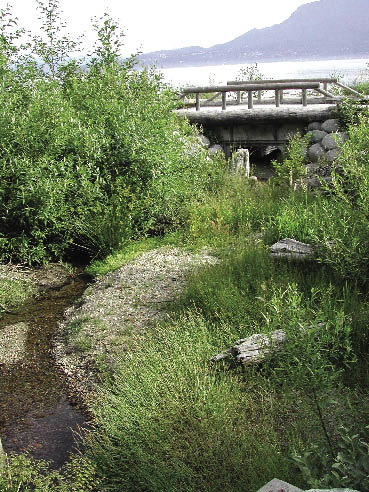
Daylighted stream at Spanish Banks, Vancouver, B.C.

Located upstream from Spanish Banks waterfront, one of the highest profile creeks in Vancouver Metro became open to salmon in 2000. In a collaborative project between Spanish Banks Streamkeepers Association and the Department of Fisheries and Oceans Canada, barriers to fish passage were removed and habitat structure was added. Spanish Banks Creek was previously diverted through a culvert underneath a parking lot, but the lower reaches of this creek have been revitalized. The banks were stabilized with riprap, large woody debris was added for habitat cover, and spawning gravels were added in appropriate areas. Rigorous effectiveness monitoring has not been performed, but a few dozen coho and chum salmon are known to spawn there annually in a sustaining population. Maintenance to the creek is provided by Spanish Banks Streamkeepers Association, a local volunteer stewardship group.

===== St. George Rainway =====
The East Vancouver neighborhood of Mount Pleasant has officially incorporated into its community plan a project to restore St. George Creek, a tributary to the False Creek watershed. St. George street is the site of this former stream, which now flows through the sewers and a culvert. This paved street will be converted into a shared-use path, riparian habitat, and urban greenspace.

St. George Creek once spawned salmon and trout, and hosted a diverse riparian ecosystem. The restoration of this habitat using the rainway proposal would allow for salmon spawning, recreational and educational opportunities, and improve the community's access to nature and transportation alternatives. The proposal would pass the following community centres: Great Northern Way Campus, St. Francis Xavier School, Mt. Pleasant Elementary, Florence N. Elementary, Kivan Boys and Girls Club, Robson Park Family Centre.

Detailed landscape designs have been produced, and incorporated into the community plan of Mount Pleasant neighborhood. Project leaders from the False Creek watershed Society and Vancouver Society of Storytelling collaborated with Mount Pleasant Elementary students to create a street mural drawing attention to the belowground stream. To date, the mural is the only physical progress on the project.

===== Tatlow Creek =====
This is a future project aiming to ultimately connect the gap in the Seaside Greenway in order to link it to the Burrard Bridge. The beginning of this project has been started by the City of Vancouver in 2013, after its approval on July 29 of the same year. Volunteer Park is located in Kitsilano at the corner of Point Grey Road and Macdonald Street. This is where the main daylighting project for this area is planned to occur.

Phase one is currently in progress. Point Grey Road is currently closed to through motor traffic in order to turn the street into a greenway for cycling and walking. This part of the project is expected to be complete by summer 2014.

Phase two of this project is looking to include the daylighting of Tatlow Creek which is located in Volunteer Park. This phase must go through the City Council and the Park Board capital planning process for the 2015-2017 Capital Plan before any plans can be finalized.

Tatlow Creek had been scheduled to be daylighted in 1996, and the project to start in 1997. The project was deemed feasible and the storm water was to be diverted back into the natural creek bed and tunneled under Point Grey Road. When it was not done, the project was proposed again by a UBC masters' student as the Tatlow Creek Revitalization Project. If this project is completed as phase 2 of the new Park Board Project it would allow for salmon and trout spawning.

==== Caledon, Ontario ====
===== Credit River: East Credit Tributary =====
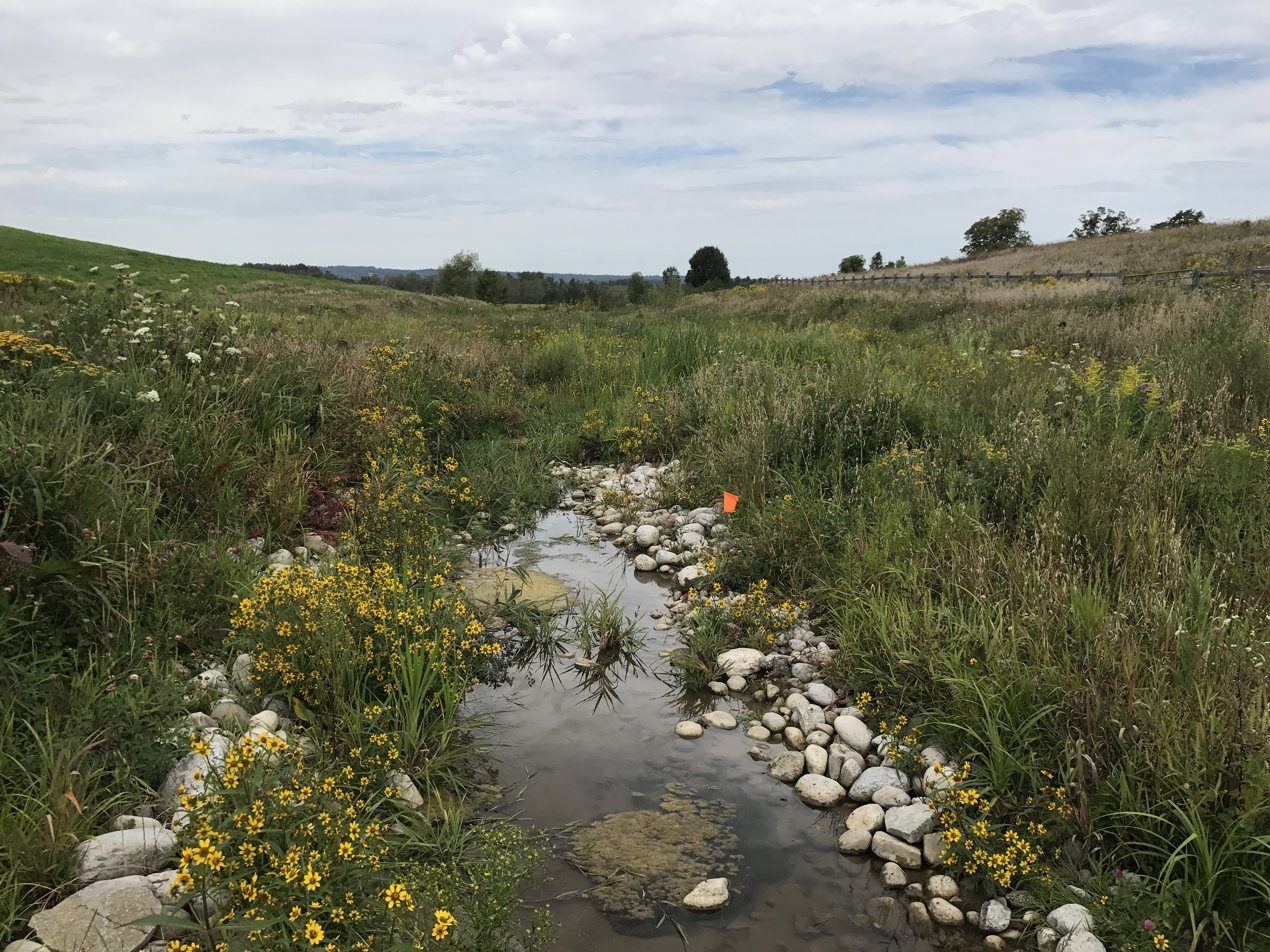
After: East Credit Tributary stream restoration

Credit Valley Conservation (CVC) worked with a private landowner to daylight 500 m of coldwater stream on their Caledon family farm. The project emerged from a decision to replace a failing tile drain on the farm property with a stream. The stream was buried in an agricultural tile in the early 1980s to facilitate agricultural operations. CVC worked collaboratively with the landowners to design and construct a new stream, stream-side grassland and wetland in 2017. The project improved biodiversity and ecosystem health. Nine species of fish have been recorded in the stream, and Bobolink and Eastern Meadowlark (both threatened bird species) use the planted riparian grassland. Frogs and toads are also thriving in the new wetland. In addition to the newly created stream, CVC removed a perched culvert downstream that was preventing fish passage to allow downstream fish populations to reach the new stream.

In January 2018, the landowners received the Ontario Heritage Trust Lieutenant Governor's Award for Conservation Excellence in recognition of the project's contribution to conservation.

The project was funded by the Fisheries and Oceans Canada, Peel Rural Water Quality Program and the Species at Risk Farm Incentive Program.

=== France ===
==== Ile de France ====
La Bièvre river

Partial reopening sections and re-naturalisation of the Bièvre river, in the region Ile de France (from the south to Paris, where it joins La Seine)

- 600 metre section in Fresnes in 2003
- 900 metres section in Verrieres-le-Buisson/Massy in 2006
- 600 metres section in L'Haÿ-les-Roses in 2016
- 600 metre section between Arcueil and Gentilly in 2021

Re-naturalisation in 2020 of a section from Bievres to Igny from a relatively straight caisson reinforced embankment to a meandering stream (excess flow diverted into a pipe).

=== Japan ===
==== Shibuya River ====
A portion of the Shibuya River (渋谷川, Shibuya-gawa), long obscured beneath urban infrastructure, was partially daylighted as part of the major redevelopment of the Shibuya Station area. Completed in 2018, the Shibuya Stream project exposed sections of the river and integrated them into the surrounding public realm, with pedestrian promenades and landscaped banks. The project restored visibility of the river and contributed to urban greening, flood resilience, and walkability in one of Tokyo's densest districts.

==== Kitazawa River ====
The Kitazawa River (北沢川), a historical tributary of the Meguro River in Setagaya Ward, was once an open watercourse running through what is now a dense residential area. As Tokyo urbanised rapidly during the 20th century, the river was largely buried into culverts to manage flood risk and create developable land. However, in recent decades, Setagaya City has worked to restore elements of the river corridor through the creation of the Kitazawa River Greenway (北沢川緑道)—a linear park and ecological trail that follows the original river's path.

While much of the Kitazawa River remains underground, several surface sections have been daylighted, where water flows visibly through small landscaped channels. These sections, interspersed along the greenway, have been carefully planted with native vegetation and integrated with pedestrian paths, cherry trees, and community gathering spaces. The stream can be seen fully resurfacing in places like Seseragi Park, where aquatic life such as crayfish and turtles is now commonly observed.

=== South Korea ===
After: Cheonggyecheon creek fully restored

In Seoul, which buried the Cheonggyecheon creek during the city's 1960s boom, an artificial waterway and adjoining parks have been built atop it. Mayor Lee Myung Bak, formerly a construction magnate with the Hyundai chaebol that helped bury the river, ran for office promising to daylight it, and achieved in 2005 a 5.8 kilometres (3.6 mi) greenspace in a city without very many parks or playgrounds. The new park is hugely popular, alleviating fears that opening the river would cause nearby businesses to lose customers.

=== Switzerland ===
==== Zürich ====
The City of Zürich's stream daylighting policy has long received the attention of researchers and is considered by some to be unique in the world. It had been adopted since 1986 and ensued in daylighting nearly 21 kilometers of Zürich's buried streams thus far. The positive impact on the quality of water and biodiversity has been significant. There are also benefits for enhanced stormwater management, and even socio-cultural benefits such as, enhanced public realm and educational ones.

=== United Kingdom ===
==== Porter Brook, Sheffield, Yorkshire ====
The Porter Brook flows from the west of Sheffield on the edge of the Peak District and flows into the River Sheaf at Sheaf Street near Sheffield Railway Station. The Porter Brook is one of Sheffield's five well known rivers, along with the Don, Sheaf, Loxley and Rivelin. The Porter has been deculverted at Matilda Street near the BBC Radio Sheffield studios. A feasibility study for the scheme was undertaken for South Yorkshire Forest Partnership by Sheffield City Council in 2013 with funding from the Environment Agency and the EU via the Interreg North Sea Region Programme. The project was completed by Sheffield City Council with funding from the Environment Agency in 2016.

The Porter Brook daylighting scheme featured in a 2016 BBC Radio 4 documentary entitled A River of Steel, produced by sound recordist Chris Watson, ex-member of Caberet Voltaire. It was also discussed in an article in The Guardian in 2017.

==== River Roch, Rochdale, Greater Manchester ====
The River Roch that runs through the town of Rochdale has recently been uncovered, revealing the medieval bridge in place. It was covered in 1904 to accommodate a tram network that has since closed.

=== United States ===
==== California ====
- Codornices Creek and Strawberry Creek, Berkeley
- Islais Creek, San Francisco

==== Maryland ====
Since the 1990s there have been several plans to daylight the Jones Falls along much of its route through downtown Baltimore.

==== Massachusetts ====
Part of Island End River flowing through Everett, Massachusetts was daylighted in 2021.

==== New York (State) ====
Yonkers, New York, the third largest city in the state, broke ground on December 15, 2010, on a project to daylight of the Saw Mill River as it runs through its downtown, called Getty Square. The daylighting project is the cornerstone of a large redevelopment effort in the downtown. An additional 2 other sections of the Saw Mill River are planned to be daylighted as well.

The first phase of the Yonkers daylighting was portrayed in the documentary Lost Rivers. The second phase, where the river runs under the Mill Street Courtyard, broke ground on March 19, 2014.

==== Ohio ====
Lick Run is a stream in Cincinnati, Ohio that was enclosed in an 18 foot diameter brick pipe in the 1880s, and has been daylighted to divert stormwater from combined sewers. The project to create the Lick Run Greenway was approved in 2010 and constructed by the Metropolitan Sewer District between 2017 and 2021. At a cost of nearly $200 million, the project daylighted more than a mile of Lick Run, reduced combined sewer overflows into the Mill Creek by nearly a billion gallons per year and created a mile-long greenway park with hiking and biking trails for the South Fairmount community.

==== Salt Lake City, Utah ====
===== City Creek =====
A public-private partnership between Salt Lake City and the Church of Jesus Christ of Latter Day Saints, exchange the ownership of a surface parking lot at 110 N State Street in Salt Lake City for development rights to an underground parking garage. In 1995, a donation by the church allowed Salt Lake City to daylight a creek channel through the newly created City Creek Park.

===== Three Creeks Confluence =====
Red Butte, Emigration, and Parleys Creeks flow into the Jordan River at 1300 South and 900 West in Salt Lake City, UT. The site was previously paved over with a dead-end segment of 1300 South. A dilapidated, vacant home existed to the north of 1300 South on the site. The area was in a neglected condition, impacted by noxious weeds, dumping, and encroachments from private property.

Approximately $3 million was secured for the construction of the Three Creeks Confluence, a partnership between Salt Lake City and the Seven Canyons Trust. Red Butte, Emigration, and Parleys Creeks were daylighted 200 feet in a newly restored channel up to 900 West. The site includes a Jordan River Trail connection, fishing bridge, and plaza space. In 2017, an Achievement Award from the Utah Chapter of the American Planning Association was received for the innovative project design and creative community engagement process.

==== Seattle, Washington ====
===== Pipers Creek =====
Pipers Creek in the central to north Greenwood area is joined by Venema and Mohlendorph Creeks in Carkeek Park on Puget Sound. Pipers is one of the four largest streams in urban Seattle, together with Longfellow, Taylor, and Thornton creeks. Pipers Creek drains a 1,835-acre (7 km^{2}) watershed into Puget Sound, from a residential upper plateau that is most of the watershed, through the steep ravines of the 216 acres (0.9 km^{2}) of Carkeek Park. The headwaters begin in the north Greenwood neighborhood.

As a result of project efforts, salmon were brought back to Pipers Creek, Venema, and Mohlendorph creeks in the mid-2000s after a fifty-year absence. The latter is named for the late Ted Mohlendorph, a biologist who spearheaded efforts to restore the watershed as salmon habitat. Though augmented by hatchery fish, anywhere from 200 to 600 chum salmon return each November, along with a few coho in the fall and fewer occasional winter steelhead. Several hundred small resident coastal cutthroat trout live in the watershed, believed to be native fish that survived decades of urban assault. An environmental learning center and programs are part of comprehensive restoration. More than four miles (6 km) of trail are maintained by neighborhood volunteers who put in 4,000 hours of work in 2003, for example. The creek waters are in restored settings, but the watershed is the surrounding neighborhoods and streets, laced with petrochemicals, pesticides, fertilizers, wandering pets, and such. Along with steeply high volume during storm runoff and resulting turbidity, water quality is the remaining big issue in restoring salmon.

The north fork of Pipers Creek is the site for the 110th Cascades, a street edge alternatives street demonstration project (see above). The 110th Cascades are a creek-like cascade of stair-stepped natural, seasonal pools that intercept, infiltrate, slow and filter over 21 acres (85,000 m^{2}) of stormwater draining through the project. The cascades are a part of a natural drainage systems) project; together these united the community visually, environmentally, and socially, toward integrating the neighborhood as a community.

===== Taylor Creek =====
Taylor Creek flows from Deadhorse Canyon (west of Rainier Avenue S at 68th Avenue S and northwest of Skyway Park), through Lakeridge Park to Lake Washington. With volunteer effort and some city matching grants, restoration has been underway since 1971. Volunteers have planted thousands of indigenous trees and plants, removed tons of garbage, removed invasive plants, and had city help removing fish-blocking culverts and improving trails. A deer has been spotted and sightings of raccoons, opossum and birds are common. By about 2050, the area will be looking like a young version of what it looked like before being disrupted. Taylor is one of the four largest streams in urban Seattle.

===== Fauntleroy Creek =====
Fauntleroy Creek in the Fauntleroy neighborhood of West Seattle flows about a mile (1.6 km) from as far east as 38th Avenue SW in the modest 33 acre (130,000 m^{2}) Fauntleroy Park at SW Barton Street, through a fish ladder at its outlet near the Fauntleroy ferry terminal (the creek drops a moderately steep 300 ft (91 m) in that one mile). Coho salmon and cutthroat trout returned as soon as barriers were removed, after concerted effort and pressure by citizen groups of activist neighbors (1989–1998). A further culvert blocks fish passage to Kilbourne Park and so on up to the headwaters in Fauntleroy Park. The 98 acre (400,000 m^{2}) watershed is about two-thirds residential development, from 1900s summer colony to post-World War II urban, with the rest natural space, primarily Fauntleroy Park.

===== Longfellow Creek =====
Longfellow Creek is one of the four largest in urban Seattle. It flows north from Roxhill Park for several miles along the valley of the Delridge neighborhood of West Seattle, turning east to reach the Duwamish Waterway via a 3,300 ft (1000 m) pipe beneath the Bethlehem Steel plant (now Nucor). Salmon returned without intervention as soon as toxic input was ended and barriers were removed, after having been extinguished for 60 years. Construction of a fish ladder at the north end of the West Seattle Golf Course will allow spawning salmon up along the fairways. Farther upstream the city has been enlarging and building more storm-detention ponds, recreation areas, and an outdoor-education center at Camp Long. An area of 3 acres (12,000 m^{2}) of open upland, wetland and wooded space just east of Chief Sealth High School in Westwood is the first daylight of Longfellow Creek. It has been the location of some plant and tree restoration since 1997. After more than a decade of preparation by hundreds of neighborhood volunteers, a restoration and 4.2 mile (6.7 km) legacy trail was completed in 2004. Further improvement by removal of invasive vegetation is ongoing as native species retake hold. Blue heron and coyote can be seen. The creek first emerges at the 10,000-year-old Roxhill Bog, south of the Westwood Village shopping center.

===== Madrona Creek =====
Citizens of Madrona neighborhoods initiated a daylighting project in 2001, encompassing from above 38th Avenue into Lake Washington. Daylighting will return the creek to a new bed and replace the sloping lawn between Lake Washington Boulevard and Lake Washington with native plantings, and with the mouth of the creek at a restored 48,000 sq ft (4,500 m^{2}) wetland cove on the lake. New culverts under 38th, the boulevard, and under a permeable pedestrian path will allow fish passage. Native plantings will restore about 1.5 acres (6,100 m^{2}), with plantings three to four feet in height at three key view corridors. Planning continued through 2004, followed by design (2205) and construction (2006). The completion celebration is scheduled for spring, 2007. The $450,000 cost is funded by community-initiated grants and private donations.

Citizen stewards of the creek and woods are represented by the Friends of Madrona Woods (1996). The urban forest encompasses about 9 acres (36,000 m^{2}), largely in a couple ravines. The park area was built 1891-1893, officially no longer maintained since the 1930s with the demise of streetcars and pedestrian lifestyles. Persistent efforts began (1995) with informal removal of ivy smothering trees, then invasive species like holly, laurel and blackberries, and realization that effective restoration would require comprehensive stewardship.

With a Department of Neighborhoods grant, the neighborhood started a formal effort. Neighborhood groups, planning with naturalists and landscape architects, brought an effective early step rebuilding trails, promoting access and building constituency. Further priorities were protection for habitat, restoration of stream beds, rehabilitation as a natural area using native plants, and using the Madrona Woods as a setting for environmental education programs at local schools. A hired landscape architect became a team member, experimental plots were set up to test different methods for revegetating with native plants. (Plants adapt to microclimates; experimentation is required to jumpstart the otherwise very long natural processes.)

Friends of Madrona Woods earned a much larger Department of Neighborhoods matching grant in 2000, funding the creation of a master action plan, and major trail restoration work. The community match for the grant was nearly 2500 hours of volunteer labor by community members and school children from St. Therese and Epiphany schools. After many decades of urban use without formal maintenance, substantial trail engineering was required. EarthCorps was contracted to do the actual construction, which included 86 steps, two landings and a bridge.

In the process of clearing, volunteers found substantial erosion in the wetland hillside, leading to a grant from a Parks Department fund to stabilize it with a water cascade of natural materials. Neighbors did a little trail-building of their own with Volunteers for Outdoor Washington and an all-day trail building workshop (February 2000). Work parties continue monthly through much of the year.

===== Schmitz Creek =====
Schmitz Creek in the Alki neighborhood of West Seattle flows to the sound from Schmitz Park, SW 55th Avenue at SW Admiral Way. Apart from the paved entrance and a parking lot at the northwest corner, the park has remained essentially unchanged since its 53 acres (210,000 m^{2}) were protected 1908-1912 from complete logging. Fragmentary old growth forest remains. Daylighting and drainage rebuilding to handle seasonal and storm flow was done 2001-2003.

== See also ==
- Stream restoration
- Subterranean river
- Water resources

== Bibliography ==
- "110th Cascade". About SPU > Drainage & Sewer System > Natural Drainage Systems. Seattle Public Utilities. 2003-12-03. Archived from the original on September 29, 2007.
- "About EarthCorps". Archived from the original on 2006-06-26.
- "About Us". Friends of Schmittz Park. 2002. Archived from the original on 2006-02-16.
- "Carkeek Park Improvements". Pro Parks Project Information. Seattle Parks and Recreation. 2005-07-20.
- "Creek initiative's sponsor asks court to dismiss lawsuit". Seattle Post-Intelligencer. 2003-06-25.
- Kirk, Donald (2005-10-13). "Seoul peels back concrete to let a river run freely once again". World>Asia Pacific. The Christian Science Monitor.
  File: Jae-Won, Lee. "A CITY RUNS THROUGH IT: Residents waded into the newly restored Chonggyechon River earlier this month in downtown Seoul, South Korea."
- "Joint Creeks Task Force Planning Commission Public Hearing: March 22, 2006" (PDF). Creeks Task Force. Planning and Development, City of Berkeley. 2006-03-22.
- Dolan, Maria; True, Kathryn (2003). Nature in the city: Seattle. Seattle: Mountaineers Books. ISBN 978-0-89886-879-1.
  "with additions by Sunny Walter and local Audubon chapters." See "Northeast Seattle" section, bullet points "Meadowbrook", "Paramount Park Open Space", "North Seattle Community College Wetlands", and "Sunny Walter -- Twin Ponds".
  Particularly useful.
- "fauntleroy creek facts". Fauntleroy Watershed Council, Fauntleroy Community Association. Archived from the original on 2006-05-22.
- "Fauntleroy Watershed". Fauntleroy Watershed Council, Fauntleroy Community Association. Archived from the original on 2006-06-17.
- Fiset, Louis (2001-05-19) [corrected 2005-12-19]. "Seattle Neighborhoods: Broadview & Bitter Lake -- Thumbnail History". HistoryLink.org Essay 3287.
  Fiset referenced Warren W. Wing, To Seattle by Trolley (Edmonds, WA: Pacific Fast Mail), 1988;
  [No author, title], Portage, Winter/Spring 1984;
  Gail Lee Dubrow et al., Broadview/Bitter Lake Community History, (Seattle Department of Parks & Recreation), 1995;
  [No author, title], Today, August 4, 1976;
  [No author, title], The Seattle Times, May 22, 1930;
  [No author, title], Seattle Post-Intelligencer, August 19, 1953.
- George, Kathy (2003-11-27). "Creek initiative sponsors allege bad faith". Seattle Post-Intelligencer.
- "Getting Involved: Northgate plan angers residents". Seattle Post-Intelligencer. 2003-05-26.
- "History". Friends of Madrona Woods. 2005. Archived from the original on 2007-09-28.
  Referenced The Electric Trolley by Junius Rochester;
  Seattle 1900-1920 by Richard C. Berner;
  Seattle Now & Then by Paul Dorpat;
  The Lake Washington Story by Lucille McDonald;
  The Don Sherwood Files, Seattle Parks Department.
- "History [Carkeek Park]". Seattle Parks and Recreation. 2004-09-10.
  from the files of Don Sherwood, 1916–1981, Park Historian, Don Sherwood History Files).
- "History, Fauntleroy Park". Seattle Department of Parks and Recreation. Archived from the original on February 3, 2000.
- Hodson, Jeff (2000-02-16). "Restoration urged for Thornton Creek: Local News". The Seattle Times. Archived from the original on 2008-04-21.
  Was , NF.
- "INITIATIVE 80 -- SAVE SEATTLE CREEKS". Office of the Seattle City Clerk. 2003. Archived from the original on 2006-02-05.
- Jencks, Rosey; Leonardson, Rebecca (2004-11-29). "paper jencks". Daylighting Islais Creek: A Feasibility Study.
  Overview and links to full document in PDF.
- Johnston, Greg (2004-02-19). "Carkeek Park: A quiet urban refuge". Getaways: Outside. Seattle Post-Intelligencer.
- Lehner, Peter; Aponte Clark, George P.; Cameron, Diane M.; Frank, Andrew G. (May 1999). "Strategies in the Pacific Northwest". Stormwater Strategies. Natural Resources Defense Council. Archived from the original on 2006-06-04.
  Clean Water & Oceans: Water Pollution: In Depth: Report > Stormwater Strategies Community Responses to Runoff Pollution
  Date per "Stormwater Strategies Community Responses to Runoff Pollution ", additional chapter 12, October 2001.
- "Madrona Park Creek Daylighting and Restoration: Project Information". Seattle Parks and Recreation. Archived from the original on February 11, 2007.
  Planning 2001-2004, construction 2006.
- Mulady, Kathy (2003-07-31). "Restoration issue struck from ballot". Seattle Post-Intelligencer.
- Mulady, Kathy (2003-03-18). "Critics rip Northgate plan". Seattle Post-Intelligencer.
- Mulady, Kathy; McClure, Robert (2003-06-20). "Creek initiative finds foes in developers, Realtors, city". Seattle Post-Intelligencer.
- Mulady, Kathy (2004-06-08). "Thornton Creek may see daylight again". Seattle Post-Intelligencer.
- "Native Plant Stewardship Program". 2000 and 2001 Native Plant Steward Projects, P-Z. Washington Native Plant Society. 2004-10-12. Archived from the original on 2005-11-08.
  Thistle St. Longfellow Creek Greenspace
- "Natural Drainage Systems Overview". About SPU > Drainage & Sewer System > Natural Drainage Systems. Seattle Public Utilities. 2003-12-03. Archived from the original on September 29, 2007.
- Phelps, Myra L. (1978). Public works in Seattle. Seattle: Seattle Engineering Department. ISBN 978-0-9601928-1-6.
- "Pipers Creek". About SPU > Drainage & Sewer System. Seattle Public Utilities. 2003-12-03. Archived from the original on 2006-06-14.
- "Publications". Ravenna Creek Alliance. Archived from the original on 2007-11-15.
  Good list of news articles; also newsletters and official correspondence.
- Scott, Joan (2005). "Restoration History". Friends of Madrona Woods. Archived from the original on 2006-07-13.
- "Save Seattle Creeks measure goes on ballot". Seattle Post-Intelligencer. 2003-02-25.
- "Schmitz Preserve Park Improvements". Pro Parks Project Information. Seattle Parks and Recreation. 2003-06-13.
- "Street Edge Alternatives (SEA Streets) Project Index". About SPU > Drainage & Sewer System > Natural Drainage Systems. Seattle Public Utilities. Archived from the original on 2006-05-12.
- True, Kathryn (2005-08-18). "The poetry of Longfellow Creek". TRAVEL / OUTDOORS. The Seattle Times. Archived from the original on 2006-05-12.
- Walter, Sunny; local Audubon chapters (2006-02-10). "Sunny Walter's Washington Nature Weekends: Wildlife Viewing Locations - Greater Seattle Area". Archived from the original on 2005-03-22.
  Viewing locations only; the book has walks, hikes, wildlife, and natural wonders.
  Walter excerpted from
  - Dolan, Maria; True, Kathryn (2003). Nature in the city: Seattle. Seattle: Mountaineers Books. ISBN 0-89886-879-3.
    "with additions by Sunny Walter and local Audubon chapters." See "Northeast Seattle" section, bullet points "Meadowbrook", "Paramount Park Open Space", "North Seattle Community College Wetlands", and "Sunny Walter -- Twin Ponds".
- Young, Bob (2003-06-20). "City files lawsuit to remove creeks issue from ballot". The Seattle Times.
- Young, Bob (2003-07-31). "Initiative up a creek after ruling by judge". The Seattle Times.
  Includes summary title of Initiative 80.
