= Marin Creek =

Marin Creek (Upper) Marin Creek Village Creek (Lower Marin Creek)
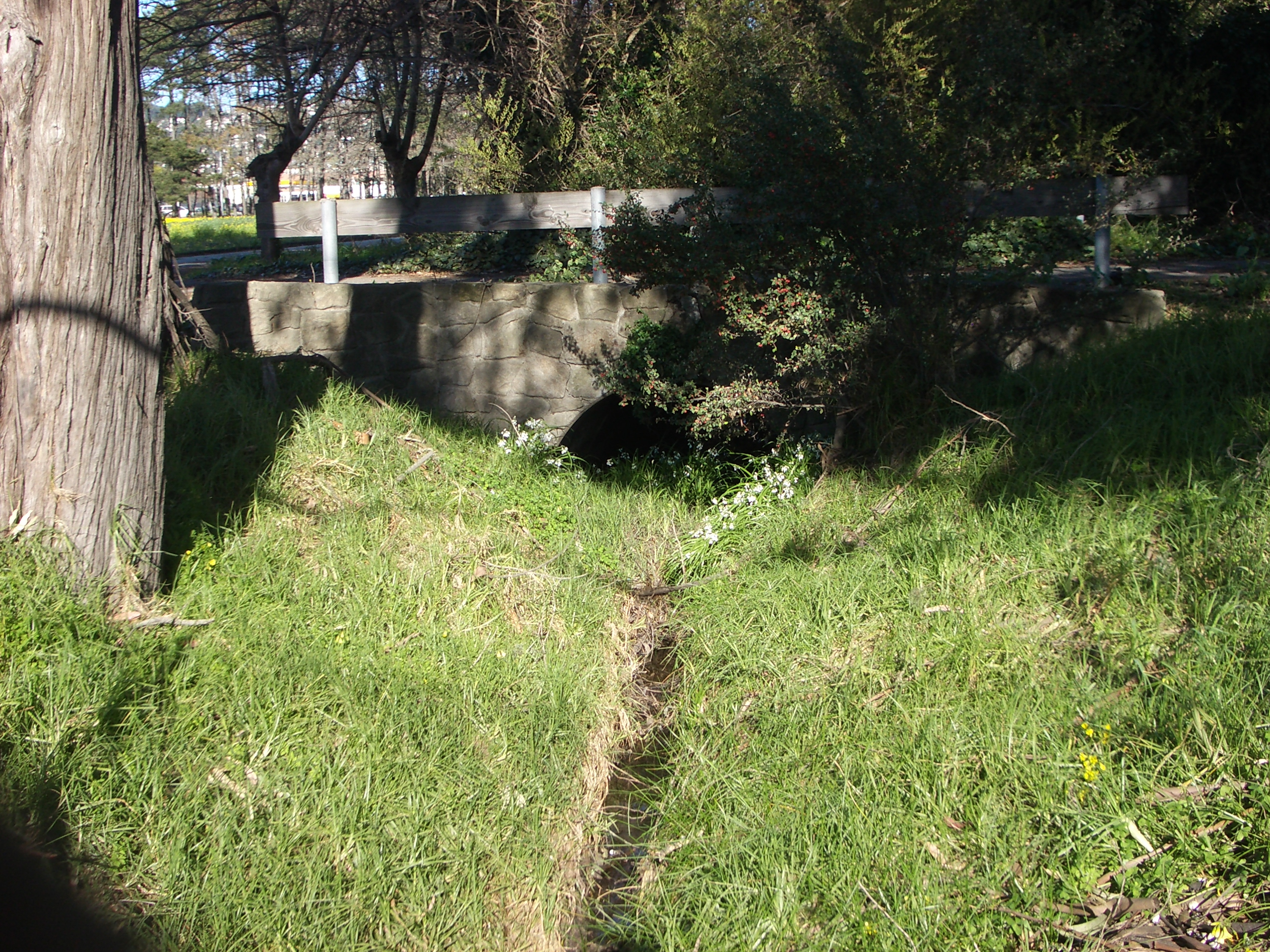
- Daylighted portion of lower Marin Creek (Village Creek) in the Gill Tract, UC Village area

- Location of the mouth of Marin Creek in California

Location
- Country: United States
- State: California
- Region: Alameda County
- City: Berkeley and Albany, California

Physical characteristics
- Source: springs
  - location: Berkeley Hills
  - coordinates: 37°53′24″N 122°16′31″W
- Mouth: Eastshore embayment, San Francisco Bay
  - location: Albany Beach, United States
  - coordinates: 37°53′19″N 122°18′31″W

Basin features
- River system: Codornices Creek

Marin Creek is a creek tributary of Codornices Creek in northwestern Alameda County, California. The lower stretch of Marin Creek is also known as Village Creek.

== Overview ==
The creek runs from the Berkeley Hills through the cities of Berkeley and Albany to San Francisco Bay. Throughout much of its course, it runs in culverts. Below San Pablo Avenue through the University Village, it runs in the open in several stretches. It was daylighted in the course of the construction of the Target store between Eastshore Highway and the Union Pacific tracks. The creek empties into a slough it shares with Codornices Creek and Schoolhouse Creek. The slough, which has been largely filled in, lies between the Golden Gate Fields racetrack and the Eastshore Freeway.

Open sections of the creek are maintained by Friends of the Five Creeks, a community organization.

In the early 20th century, a portion of the creek flowed through a channel in the center of Marin Avenue in Albany, which has since been culverted. In fact the creek has been culverted nearly in its entirety under Marin Avenue. Culverting of this creek has led to flooding and drainage problems in Albany, as this practice is not a sound or permanent method of containing drainwater.

The University of California Berkeley daylighted a portion of Lower Marin or Village Creek. The 900-foot (0.27 km) stretch of the creek through UC Village has been modeled into an 1,125-foot (0.34 km) 0.77 acre (.31 hectares) riparian habitat with the purposes of habitat restoration and community protection from a 100-year flood.
