= Strawberry Creek =

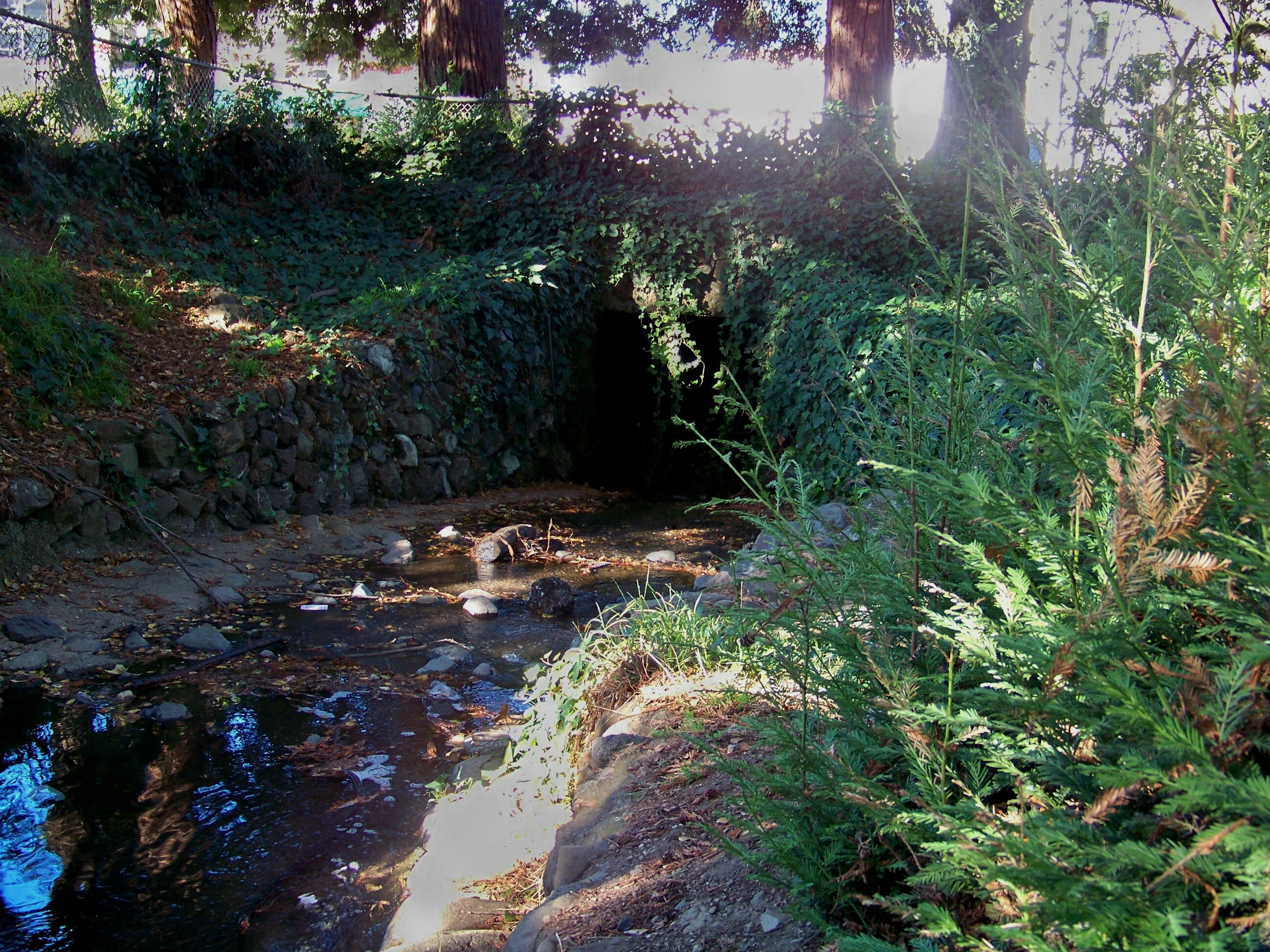

Location
- Country: United States
- State: California
- Region: Alameda County
- City: Berkeley

Physical characteristics
- Source: Berkeley Hills
  - location: Oakland
  - coordinates: 37°52′51″N 122°13′54″W
- Mouth: San Francisco Bay

Strawberry Creek is the principal watercourse running through the city of Berkeley, California. Two forks rise in the Berkeley Hills of the California Coast Ranges, and form a confluence at the campus of the University of California, Berkeley. The creek then flows westward across the city to discharge into San Francisco Bay.

The north fork has also been called "Blackberry Creek", a name which has also been applied to another small creek in Berkeley, a portion of which has been daylighted through Thousand Oaks School Park. The canyon in which the north fork of Strawberry Creek runs is called "Blackberry Canyon".

Strawberry Creek serves as a significant marker for the movement of the Hayward Fault. The creek is offset at the mouth of Strawberry Canyon, precisely at the locus of California Memorial Stadium. The filled-in middle forks located in the middle of the UC campus are thought to represent remnants of the former course of the south (main) fork of the creek, which have moved northward by fault action.

== History ==
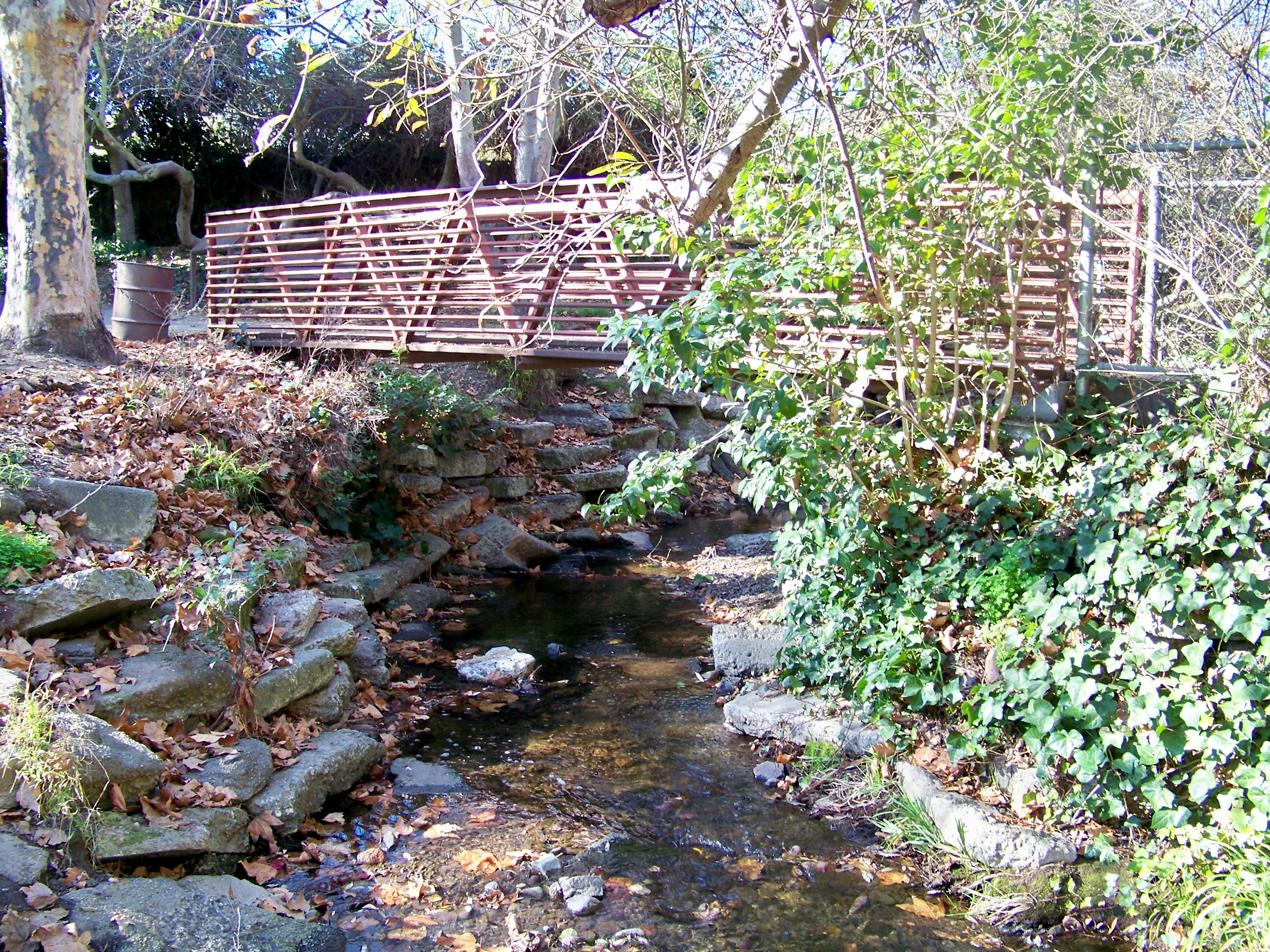

Strawberry Creek was the first surface water source for the university and parts of the city of Berkeley. A reservoir was constructed in the late 19th century in Strawberry Canyon, above the site of California Memorial Stadium. The reservoir became obsolete in the early 20th century by construction of the East Bay Municipal Utility District water system. Construction of the stadium removed a waterfall and culverted the creek in that area.

In the latter half of the 19th century, a road bridge and a railroad trestle both spanned Strawberry Creek in the downtown section at what is now the intersection of Shattuck Avenue and Allston Way. These were torn down and replaced by culverts in April–May 1893. In the process, a small grove of large and ancient oaks in the same locale was cut down.

Skeletons of Native Americans have been un-earthed along the banks of Strawberry Creek.

The creek has been culverted over the years in several other locations, notably in public-works projects during the Great Depression of the 1930s, but has remained open through most of the UC campus, except in the central glade where the two small middle forks were long ago filled in. The south fork of Strawberry Creek has some riparian coast redwood groves on the university campus and is also suitable habitat for the California slender salamander and arboreal salamander.

Water pollution due to urbanization in the beginning of the twentieth century has degraded the environmental quality of the creek. In 1987, the Strawberry Creek Restoration Program (SCRP) was founded to realize some of the goals listed under UC Berkeley graduate student Robert Charbonneau's Strawberry Creek Management Plan. By 1988, the program had successfully aided in the re-introduction of three native fish species to the creek. The condition of Strawberry Creek was restored to satisfaction in 1991. Since then, environmental education and restoration programs continues to monitor the quality of the creek, through the work of the student-led SCRP and collaboration with other environmental groups.

== Reintroduction of native organisms ==
=== Fish ===
Strawberry Creek used to have around 13 native fish species, including coldwater salmonids, anadromous steelhead and coho salmon. However, observing fish was difficult due to pollution, a decrease in fish population, and poor water quality. Therefore, historical trend data was not available, so the reintroduction data was majorly based on recent studies. Since then, five species have been reintroduced to the creek: three spined stickleback (Gasterosteus aculeatus), California roach (Lavinias symmetricus), California Hitch (Lavinia exilicauda), Sacramento sucker (Catostomus occidentalis), and the prickly sculpin (Cottus asper).

The attempts to reintroduce native fish were not successful. First, the water quality of the creek was not good enough for fish to inhabit. Water quality tests confirmed the water contained a disturbing amount of mercury and coliform, which was dangerous for not only humans, but also animals that contact with the water. The sanitary issues were partly caused by improper disposal of garbage and poorly engineered drain system. Secondly, high flow rates, and more importantly, great difference in flow rates is a great concern for the reintroduction of fish. High flow rates can be up to 118 times faster than the regular flow rates at the same location. High flow rates were caused by the construction of dams along the creek. Reintroduced fish were not able to inhabit under such circumstances. Finally, the introduction of non-native crayfish species Pacifastacus leniusculus and Procambarus clarkii have had a negative impact on the native fish population. Crayfish are more aggressive than the native fish species in predation, therefore, have a potential to threaten local fish abundance.

=== Plants ===
Since urbanization, new species were introduced to Strawberry creek. The invasion of exotic plants has endangered the existence of local seedlings. Low biomass of native seedlings is caused by the competition of water in the soil. Exotic species have different rates of growth and evapotranspiration, which changes the soil moisture of the creek. For example, Algerian ivy and English Ivy have taken over the native habitat. They required minimum management and were capable of absorbing pollution, therefore, they were able to spread quickly and dominate the creek area. Ivy has decreased the soil moisture, which makes it even harder for native species to survive.Additionally, invasive species such as leafhoppers and nutria consume crops and disrupt the overall health of Strawberry Creek. These species deeply threaten vegetation as well as other organisms since they may carry parasites that may kill off native species at faster rates.

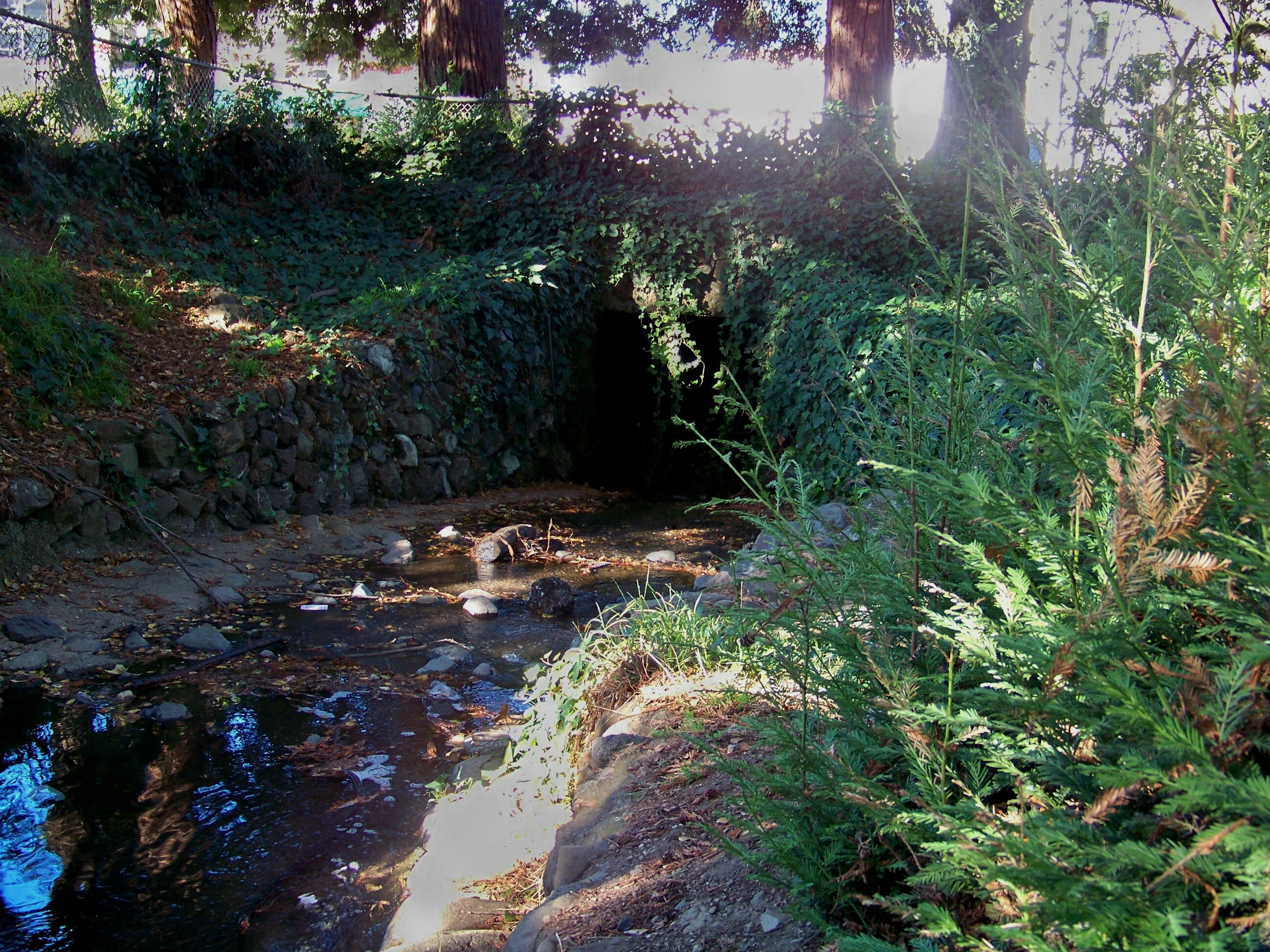
Invasive Ivy, Strawberry Creek, Berkeley, CA

== Daylighting proposals ==
Efforts to re-open or daylight the creek throughout its natural course through Berkeley continue, and have so far resulted in the establishment of "Strawberry Creek Park" in West Berkeley on the site of what used to be a small freight yard of the Santa Fe Railway. The creek is also open through several private yards in the blocks east of the park, starting just below (west of) Sacramento Street.

In 2010, momentum grew behind a plan to divert water from Strawberry Creek to the surface alongside Center Street. This proposal, backed largely by Ecocity Builders' Richard Register, would not restore the creek's original riparian habitat or path (which lies one block south along Allston Way). Instead, it would incorporate representational elements of the stream into a pedestrian plaza.

== Mouth ==
At the mouth of Strawberry Creek where it enters San Francisco Bay, the local indigenous people built up a shellmound. Until the end of the 1700s, the Ohlone indigenous people would eat shellfish provided by the creek and pile the empty shells into a mound, signifying a sacred burial site. There was also a small wood of native willows here which was used in the late 19th century as a park. Jacobs' Landing, established early during the California Gold Rush, was the nucleus around which the Ocean View settlement that predated Berkeley was founded. The creek now enters San Francisco Bay from a rectangular concrete culvert mouth, south of University Avenue and west of the I-80/580 freeway, behind Sea Breeze Market and Deli. This area is now part of Eastshore State Park, managed by the East Bay Regional Park District. The tide flats at the creek mouth are important shorebird habitats, popular with bird watchers. Friends of Five Creeks, a volunteer group, has worked since 2000 to control invasives and re-establish some native vegetation here.

== Land use ==
UC Berkeley has developed the upper Strawberry Creek watershed. The university's central campus, including parking lots, green spaces, roadways, and Lawrence Berkeley Labs were built in this area. In addition, recreational structures such as Kleeberger Field, Memorial Stadium, and the Hats Recreation Area were constructed in the area. The total urbanized areas in the watershed comprised about 37% of the total area.

== Monitoring Efforts ==
In recent years, the community-based Strawberry Creek Monitoring Group, has undertaken environmental monitoring and data analysis of the creek. The group operates an online analytics portal with live and historical water quality data and provides a free public API for accessing sensor readings. It has also implemented a machine learning–based system that sends SMS and email alerts when sensor data exceeds specified thresholds, to aid early response efforts for pollution events or chemical spills.Additionally, students in the UC Berkeley campus have contributed to student-led initiatives such as the Strawberry Creek Restoration Program, which aims to pull out invasive species (such as Algerian and English ivy) out of the creek. The goal of this restoration program is to restore moisture in the creek to encourage biodiversity and help soil conditions that are constantly threatened by invasive species.

== Gallery ==
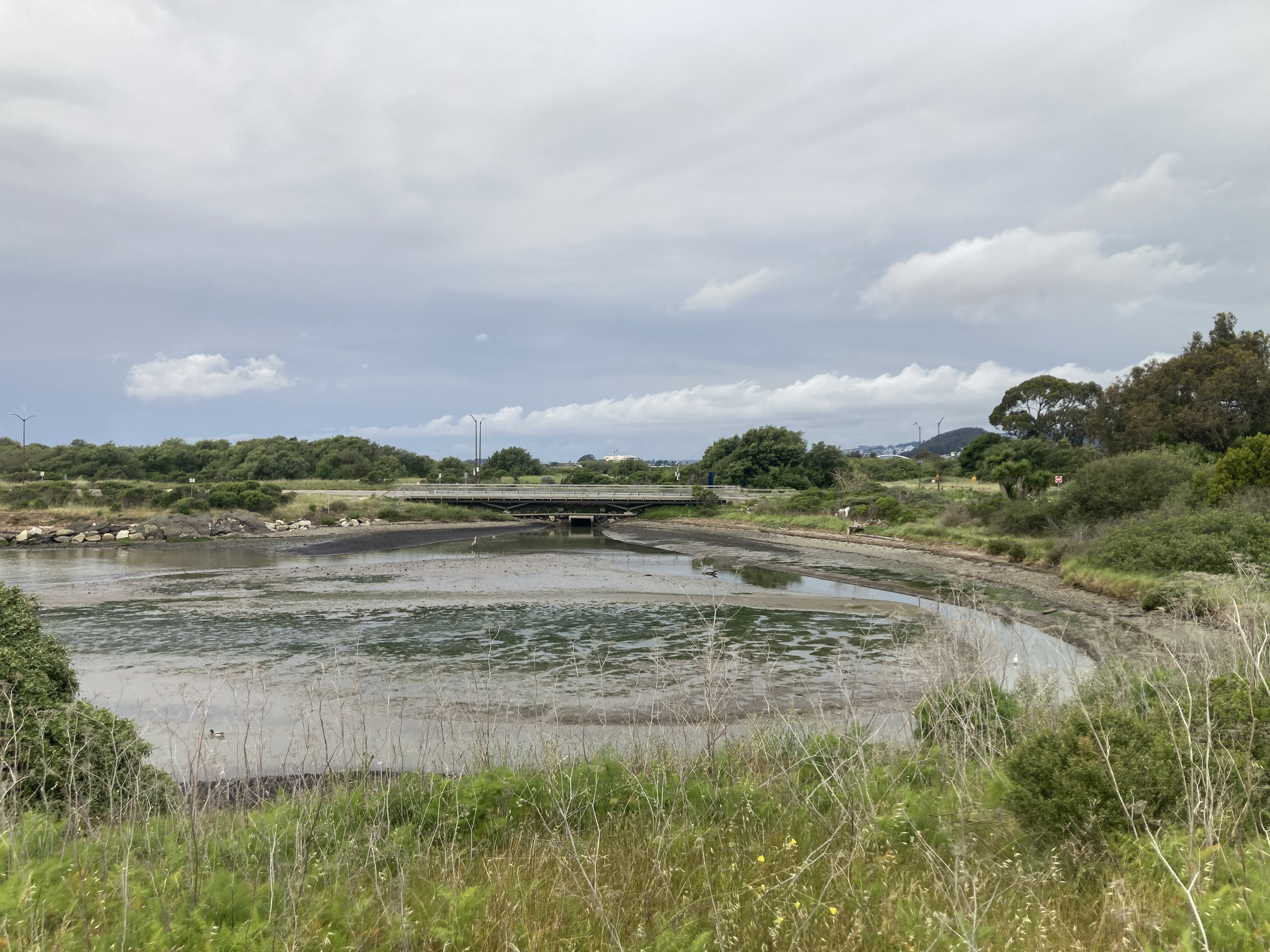
The mouth of Strawberry Creek where it feeds into the San Francisco Bay.

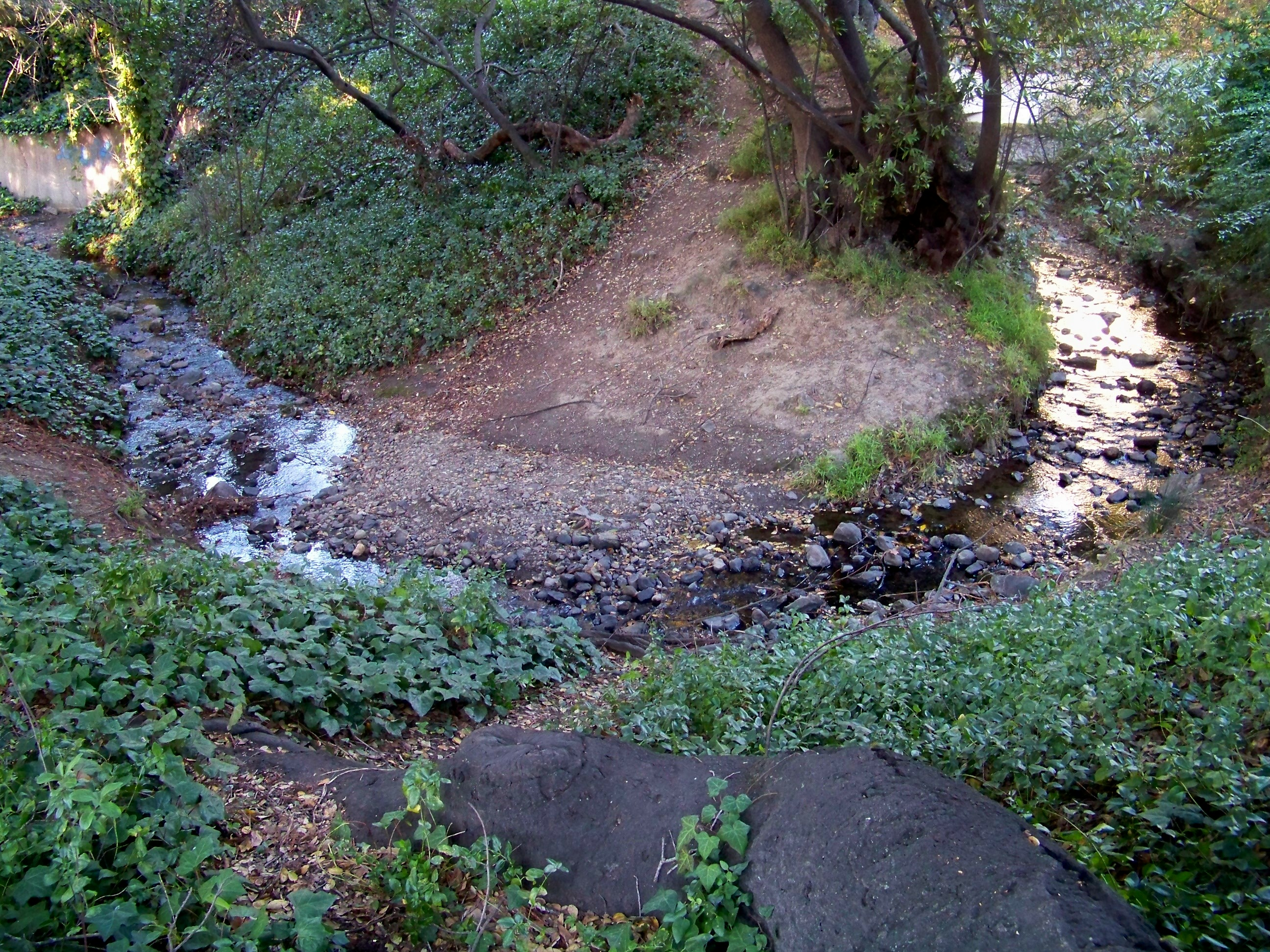
Ivy dominating Strawberry Creek.

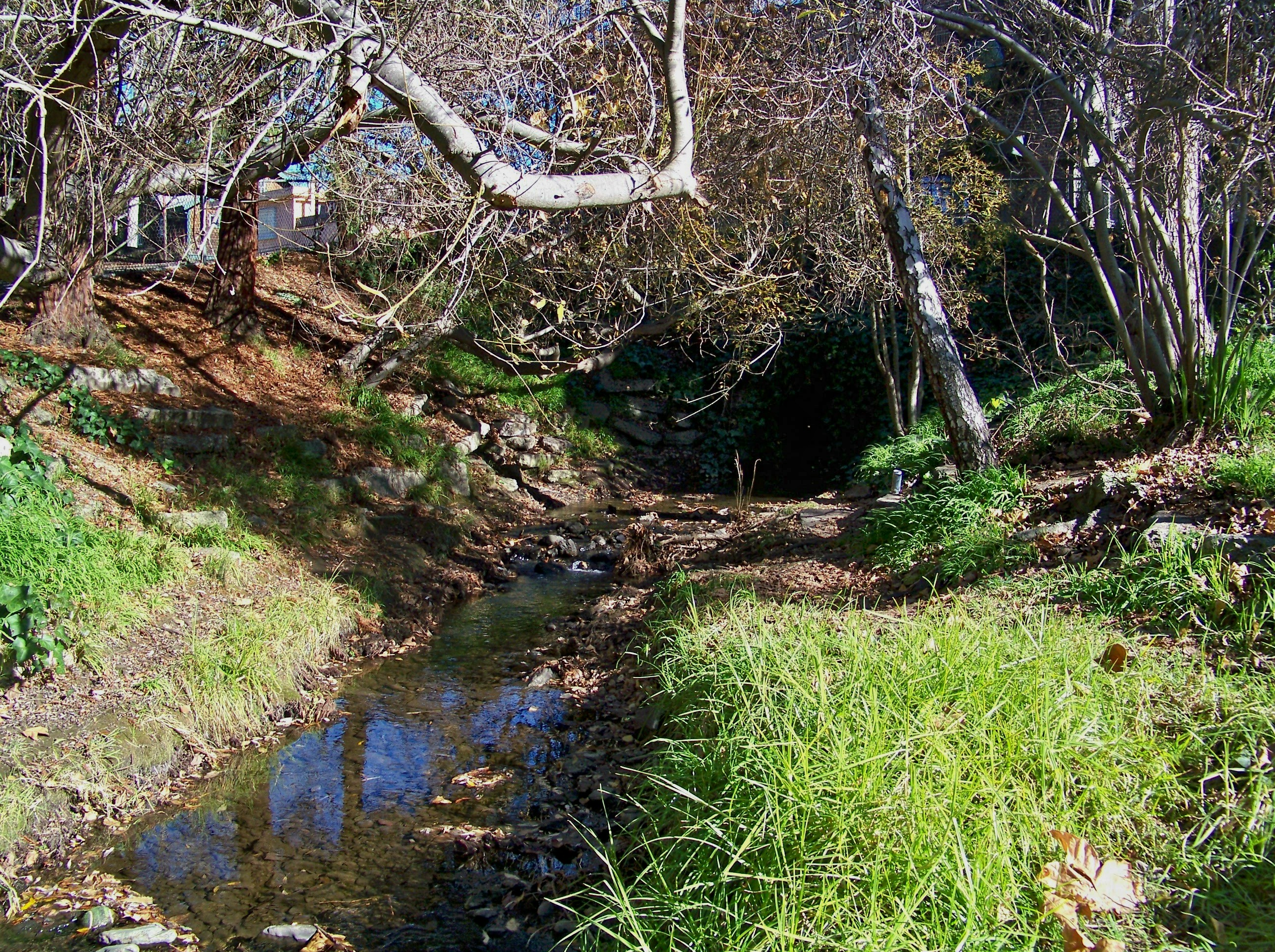
The creek in winter.

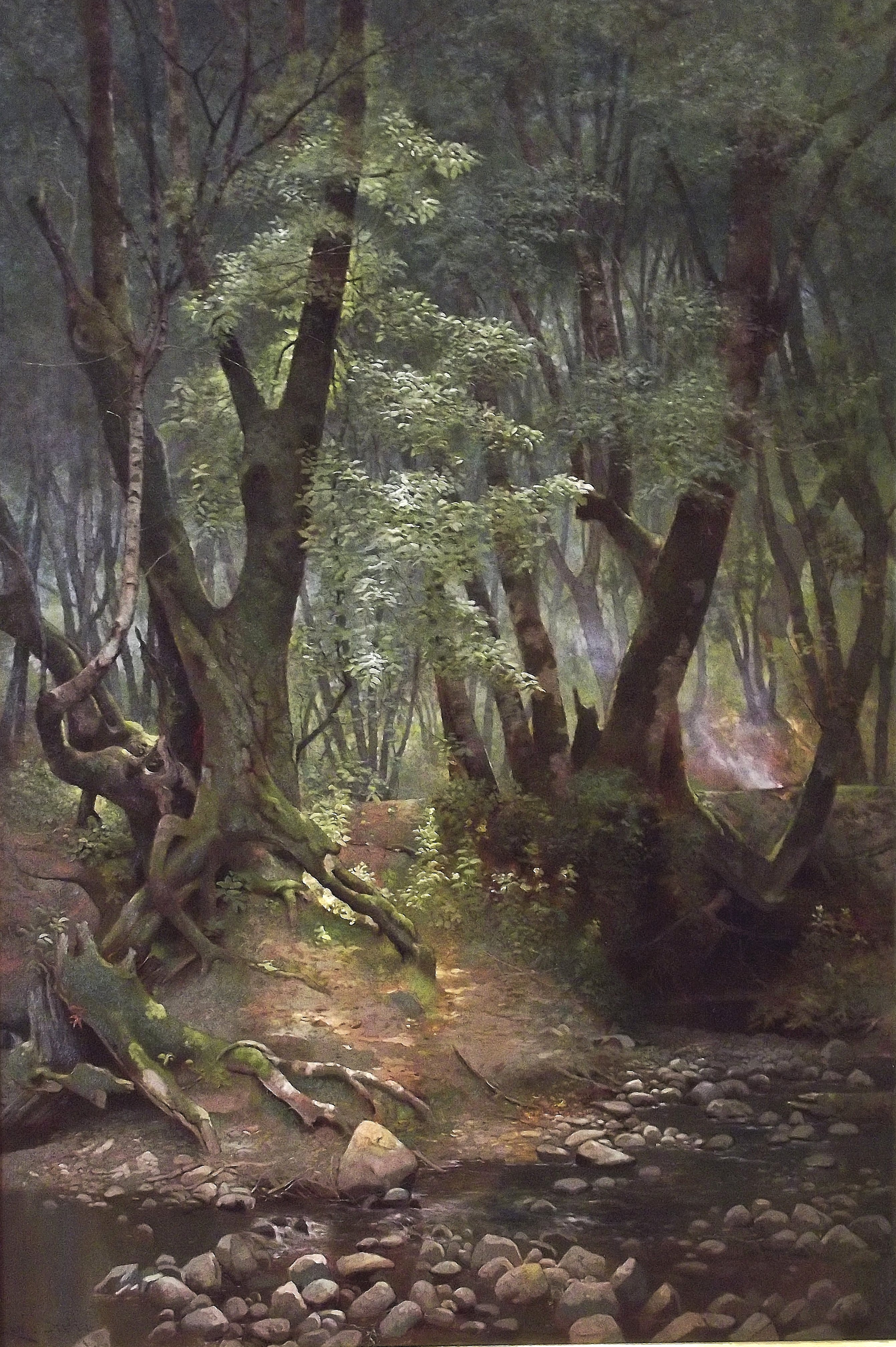
Strawberry Creek, Berkeley, by Edwin Deakin

== See also ==
- Cerrito Creek
- Codornices Creek
- List of watercourses in the San Francisco Bay Area
- Schoolhouse Creek
- Temescal Creek
