= UC Village =

Housing community in California, United States

Coordinates: 37°53′06″N 122°18′04″W

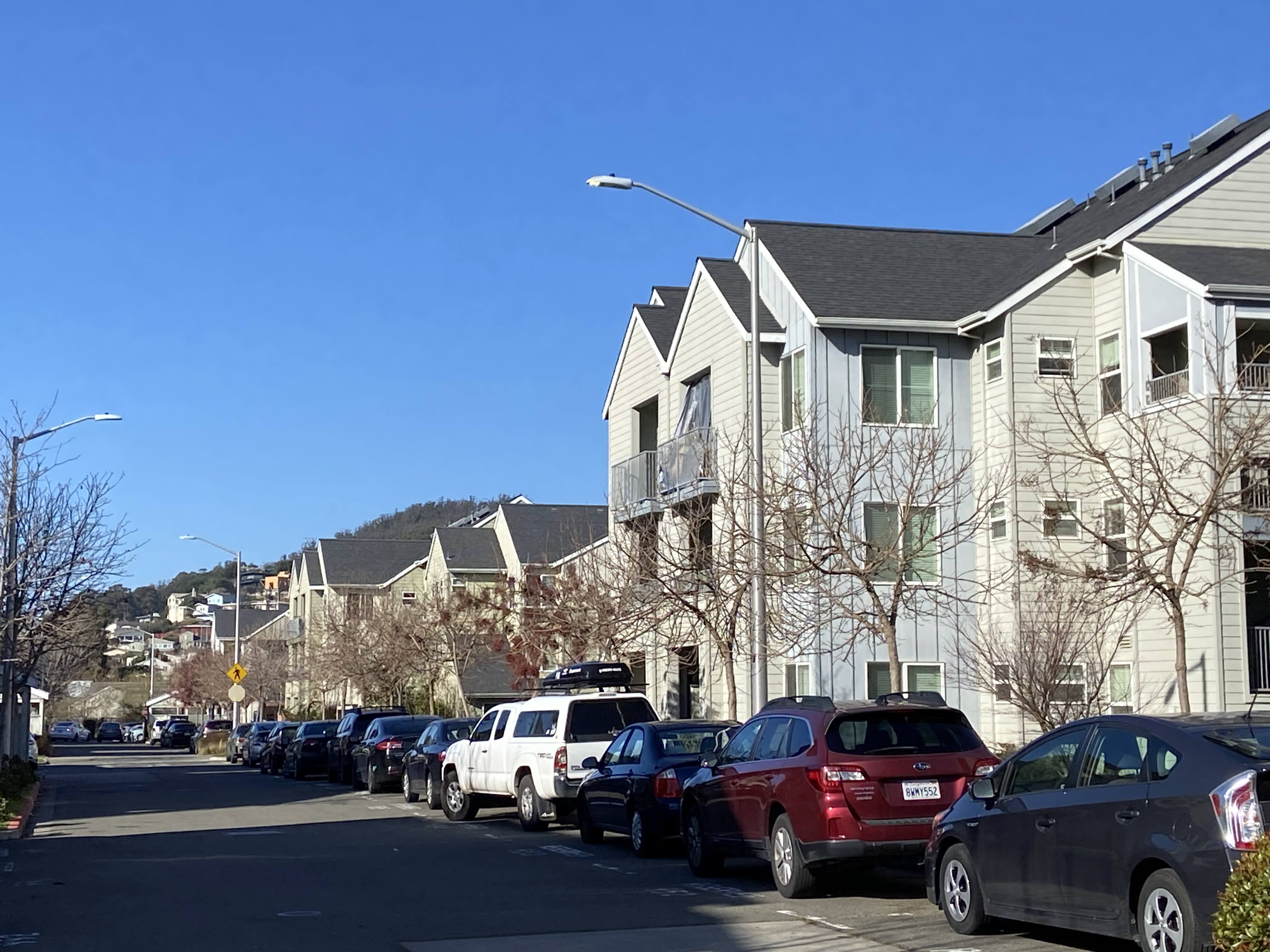
University Village

UC Village, also called University Village or University Village Albany, is a housing community for students and postdocs who are married or have dependents. It is owned and administered by the University of California, Berkeley. It is located within the city limits of Albany about 2 miles (3.2 km) away from the main Berkeley campus, at an elevation of 26 feet (7.9 m). It was originally known as Codornices Village, and later, Albany Village. It is also commonly referred to as The Village.

The University Village is located on the Gill Tract, at the foot of Codornices and Marin Creeks. It began as a federal housing project for some of the thousands of families of workers who came to the San Francisco Bay Area to work in various war industries during World War II, especially the Kaiser Shipyards in nearby Richmond and Mare Island Naval Shipyard in Vallejo. It originally extended across the city limits past Codornices Creek into Berkeley as far south as Camelia Street. It was built on land leased from the university and other owners. Around 1954, some of the village buildings were acquired by the University of California. The Berkeley section was demolished.

During the war, the Key System constructed a massive wooden trestle through and over the heart of the village and the nearby Southern Pacific railroad's mainline for the Shipyard Railway to Kaiser Shipyards. It was dismantled at the end of the war.

== History ==
=== Codornices Village ===
Even before the U.S. entered WWII, war production brought workers to the SF Bay area and strained the housing supply.

The federal government passed the Lanham act in 1940 which funded housing and daycare for civilian war workers. To assuage private real estate interests, the Lanham act provided for the removal of the war housing two years after the war emergency ended, unless a local government would take ownership. Unlike the Housing Act of 1937, which required the demolition of one unit of housing for each new unit built, the Lanham act encouraged building on already vacant land.

In 1943, the Federal War Housing Agency announced plans to create and operate a large racially integrated project in Berkeley and Albany to house civilian war workers and their families. Private real estate developers had not created enough housing for war workers. It would eventually house 8000-10000 people in an area of Berkeley and Albany bordered by Camilia street, San Pablo, and Buchanan and be known as Codornices Village.

Both the Albany and Berkeley city councils protested the project, claiming private developers would be able to meet the need and that the housing should not be located in Berkeley. Berkeley City Councilmembers Martin, Staats, and McKee were in opposition to the establishment of the villages while Councilman Mork stood in support of cooperating with the federal authorities in building housing.

Construction by the Standard Building company began in 1943. The Cordonices Village included 1,896 temporary units built on 120 acres that was located on government leased land in Berkeley and Albany held by the University of California. Residents first moved in April 1944. The project included the integrated Codornices Elementary school and Children's Center, as well as recreation facilities. Trains transported workers from Codornices Village to the Richmond shipyards and to Mare Island in Vallejo.

The buildings were 2 story flat roof apartments with drywall and included a heater, refrigerator and stove.They were built on land from 60 different owners, including the U.C. Regents, which was rented by the Federal Works Agency. Codornices Village residents paid rent which would allow the project to return $3,175,000 to the Treasury by 1954, as well as paying land rent to land owners, and $760,000 to the cities of Albany and Berkeley.

African American workers at the time experienced difficulties and restrictions in locating housing in the private market. The Federal Works Agency projected the project would house 14% African American residents. While the Lanham act encouraged consideration of the race of the area, Albany's Black population in the 1940 cenus was only 3 persons. In Berkeley, the African American population was primarily restricted to the south west portion of the city.

Though the housing was integrated, initially African American families were assigned by the Navy to the less desirable units on the west side, located near the factories, dump, and railroad tracks. In 1946, under the direction of a resident committee and housing manager David Kinkead, the village intentionally integrated, placing "White families in units vacated by Black families and vice versa." Kinkead assessed compliance with non-discrimination and non-segregation policies of the Cordonices Village, recommending that staff be screened for prejudices and began providing paid training for staff. Despite resistance and criticism to non-segregation practices, the residents of the Cordonices Villages built community through mixed-race recreational programs and engaged in shared communal responsibilities. The only complaints from the residents were due to the living conditions of the west side of the village. After the unwillingness of White families to move to the west side, repairs, new landscaping with lawns, and bus services were added.

After WWII, cities were eligible under the Lanham Act to take over the housing and continue to operate it, but Berkeley and Albany declined to do so. At the same time, Atchison Village, another Lanham Act project in Richmond, was transferred to the Richmond Housing Authority, which sold it to its residents.

In 1947, Codornices Village had a wait-list of 1800 families including many veterans.

The mayor of Berkeley proposed that the 8000 Codornices residents should move to Richmond, and the mayor of Richmond responded that they should stay in Berkeley. City councils claimed the housing was not up to code, and that it should be torn down.

Codornices Village continued to operate under a series of 1 year extensions and a multiyear extension requested by the federal government at the start of the Korean War in 1950. Over time, more and more of the white residents of the village found housing outside the village. As of 1953, the population was 80% Black and 20% White. The village in 1954 had 7000 residents of whom 88% were minorities.

In 1948, the Cordonices Village Council advocated for Albany, Berkeley, or Alameda County to take over and continue operation of the village. The Housing Act of 1949 extended funds, and the Housing Act of 1950 established that the Berkeley City Council was to be in charge of the Codornices Village, though Councilman Martin pushed the motion to forfeit the acquisition of Cordonices Village. In 1952, a Presidential Order continued operations of the Codornices Village until 1954.

In 1954, with no local authority expressing interest in operating the village, eviction notices were issued by the federal government, and demolition began. The University of California abstained from the fight over housing operations between the pro-housing movement and the City Councils, though later purchased the housing to build in Albany to convert the units to student family housing. Hundreds of families with children moved to South Berkeley, leading to overcrowding in elementary schools there, and a layoff of 14 teachers in Albany. Codornices Village closed on January 1, 1956.

With the closure of Codornices Village, the Black population of Albany fell from 1778 in the 1950 census to 75 in the 1960 census.

As the Codornices Village closed, the UC Regents negotiated to acquire 40 of the buildings that remained including the Rec center and Children's center, and renamed the project University Village. After a small amount of refurbishment, these buildings formed the start of student housing in the Village and continued to be used for housing university student families until 2007, 50 years later.

=== University Village ===
In 1956, the University acquired 40 of the Codornices Village two story apartment buildings along with the 14 Kula Gulf single story buildings totaling 420 apartments for the nominal cost of $44,000. Inspectors found the buildings to be sound, even after having survived a gale in 1955. Together these apartments were known as Section A.

By April 1956, 28 families were already living in Kula Gulf apartments.

These 420 apartments were refurbished in 3 phases allowing for immediate occupancy. Refurbishment was financed with a 10 year loan of $634K which was repaid from rent. By Sept of 1956 400 families had moved in. The rent for the Codornices apartments ranged from $35 to $47 per month. The Kula gulf apartments ranged from $40 - $52.

In 1960, plans were made for adding 500 new apartments that would be known as Section B at an estimated cost of $3,871,000 which was financed by a loan from the U.S.Community Facilities Administration of the Housing and Home Finance Agency and which would be paid back from rent over the next 30 years. There were 15 3 story buildings and 35 two story buildings. There were 1 and 2 bedroom floor plans. Larger families could apply for 3 bedroom townhouse style apartments.

Section B was organized in courtyards, with 3 buildings around most courtyards. Balconies faced the courtyard, which allowed parents to monitor playing children. Each courtyard had laundry drying areas and a grassy central area. Apartments had balconies, sliding glass doors, an outdoor storage closet, and in-unit laundry machine connections. Stoves, refrigerators and wall heaters were provided. Third story apartments even had views of the bay.

Section B opened in the August, 1962. The initial rent was $70 - $90 per month.

In 1964, the UC purchased the 11 acre Harrison tract in Berkeley just south of the Village as a location for future Village housing. It would never be developed by the University, and in 1997 was sold to the US Postal Service and the City of Berkeley.

On Feb 4, 1980, the UC housing director met with 200 resident families and announced a plan to raise their rent to pay for housing construction for single students. The proposed rent increases for a 2 bedroom apartment each year were 15% in 1981 and 1982, 25% in 1983, 1984, 1985 and 1986. The proposal would triple the rent in just 6 years. Up to that time, the Village operations, debt service, utilities and maintenance had been covered by rent, and the rent had been affordable. Residents protested the unfairness and unaffordability of the plan. The university argued that government construction loans were no longer available for student housing. In June 1981, after the UC enacted a 25% rent increase, students fought the plan by putting their rent into escrow for several months instead of paying the University. After the protest, the UC dropped the proposal. The rent increases were small for many years, a 20% increase for 1981, then 2 to 13% per year, until 1994.

In 1988, the village had 2300 residents from 64 countries. 54% were from USA, 11% Korea, 8% China, 7% Taiwan. 50% of the families had children. There were 670 children 150 of whom were more than 10 years old. There were 119 single parent student families.

In 1995, the UC again proposed to raise rent to fund housing replacement, with rent increases of 5-6% for 5 years in a row. Again the village residents protested the unaffordability of the increases, along with the unfairness of residents funding their own evictions to build nicer housing which they would not be able to afford. The UC also proposed to tear down section B apartments, which were then 33 years old, instead of renovating or maintaining them. In 1998, 420 families had to vacate the village for the demolition of some Section B and Section A apartments. In the village master plan of 1998, the question of renovating or replacing section B was unresolved. In the master plan of 2004, the UC committed to tearing down all of the Section B apartments. Between 1997 and 2007, the cheapest available 2-bedroom apartments in University Village increased in price 330% from $410 to $1360 per month.

In 1998 the University of California board of regents approved a plan to replace the older student housing at UC Village with new units. Marty Takimoto, the director of communications and marketing for UC Berkeley's residential and student services department, said that mold, lead paint, proximity to the water table, and proximity to the bay were reasons why the university chose to demolish the old housing.

In 1998, 88 Section B apartments were torn down along with the Kula Gulf apartments. They were replaced by the East Village, which opened in 1999. The East Village was the most luxurious part of the Village, however it lacked both the in-unit laundry connections, as well as the laundry drying lines that had been available in Section B apartments. The East Village had 392 apartments. The cost of construction was $55,400,000. When the East Village opened the rent was $990.

In 2004, the UC approved plans to demolish the remaining 412 apartments of section B housing to build the West Village. The projected cost was $118,000,000. Village residents continued to argue that the section B housing could be renovated at a lower cost.

The West Village Apartments opened in July, 2006 with 258 units. An additional 324 new apartments were completed in August 2008, including 192 one bedroom units. When the West Village opened the rent was $1360.

The UC reported the debt service alone for the project would be $10,600,000 per year, an average of $906 per apartment per month for the 974 apartments of the village.

"Originally, West Village was intended to be similar in design to east village. Due to student protests however, the apartments were re-designed to be smaller and more economical. Still, rent in West Village in 2007 was $1360 per month, only $100 cheaper than East Village. West Village units cost over $500 more per month than the section B units they replaced."

After the openings of the East and West Village, student families could not afford the higher rent and there were vacancies. UC allowed childless couples to rent 2 and 3 bedroom apartments. Staff, postdocs, single students, visiting scholars and lecturers lived in the new apartments. The policy of renting to people who were not student families would continue for many years. Staff were allowed until 2013. Visiting scholars and Lawrence Berkeley National Lab workers were allowed until 2014. Single students were allowed until 2016.

In 2008, the remaining 152 Codornices apartments were demolished along Monroe street. The rent at the time of closing was $699. After the demolition, the cheapest remaining housing in the village was $1360 per month. The land would sit vacant until 2016. They were replaced with a pet food store, a grocery store and a senior citizen care facility.

In 2022, UC announced plans to build a six story, 289 apartment tower totaling 760 beds for graduate students without families in the Village on the site of the former Section A housing at Monroe and Jackson, which were torn down 14 years earlier in 2008. Unlike the previous buildings in the village, which have all been publicly owned and operated, the building will be a public private partnership with American Campus Communities.

== Geography ==
University Village, a 77 acres (31 ha) complex, is located in the City of Albany, 3 miles (4.8 km) northwest of the main campus. The development is bordered by Buchanan Street, United States Department of Agriculture research and office facilities, and Ocean View Elementary School to the north. In other directions, University Village is bordered by railroad tracks of Union Pacific to the west, California Route 123 (San Pablo Avenue) to the east, and Cordonices Creek to the south.

The complex has 974 units.

== Recreation ==
The complex has recreational facilities intended for families and children. The complex has an after-school recreational center for children, baseball fields, a family resource center, a playground, and soccer fields.

== Education ==
Children living in the village can attend schools within the Albany Unified School District. Some children attend the Albany Children's Center which offers preschool, before and after school care, and transitional kindergarten. The nearest elementary school is Ocean View School, although some elementary students may attend Cornell or Marin elementary schools. Older students attend Albany Middle School and Albany High School or MacGregor High School.

== Environmental Issues and Management ==
University Village is bounded on the west by railroad tracks of the Union Pacific. Due to the proximity of the railroad, the Village suffers from the noise pollution of trains honking loudly at all hours.

The landscape of the Village includes infiltration basins and vegetated swales to treat contaminants from the first flush stormwater run-off before it reaches Village and Codornices creeks.

== See also ==
- UC Berkeley student housing
- International House Berkeley
- Student Family Housing - Problem & Solution (video documentary)
