= Schoolhouse Creek (Alameda County) =

River in Alameda County, California, United States

Coordinates: 37.87066°N 122.3072°W

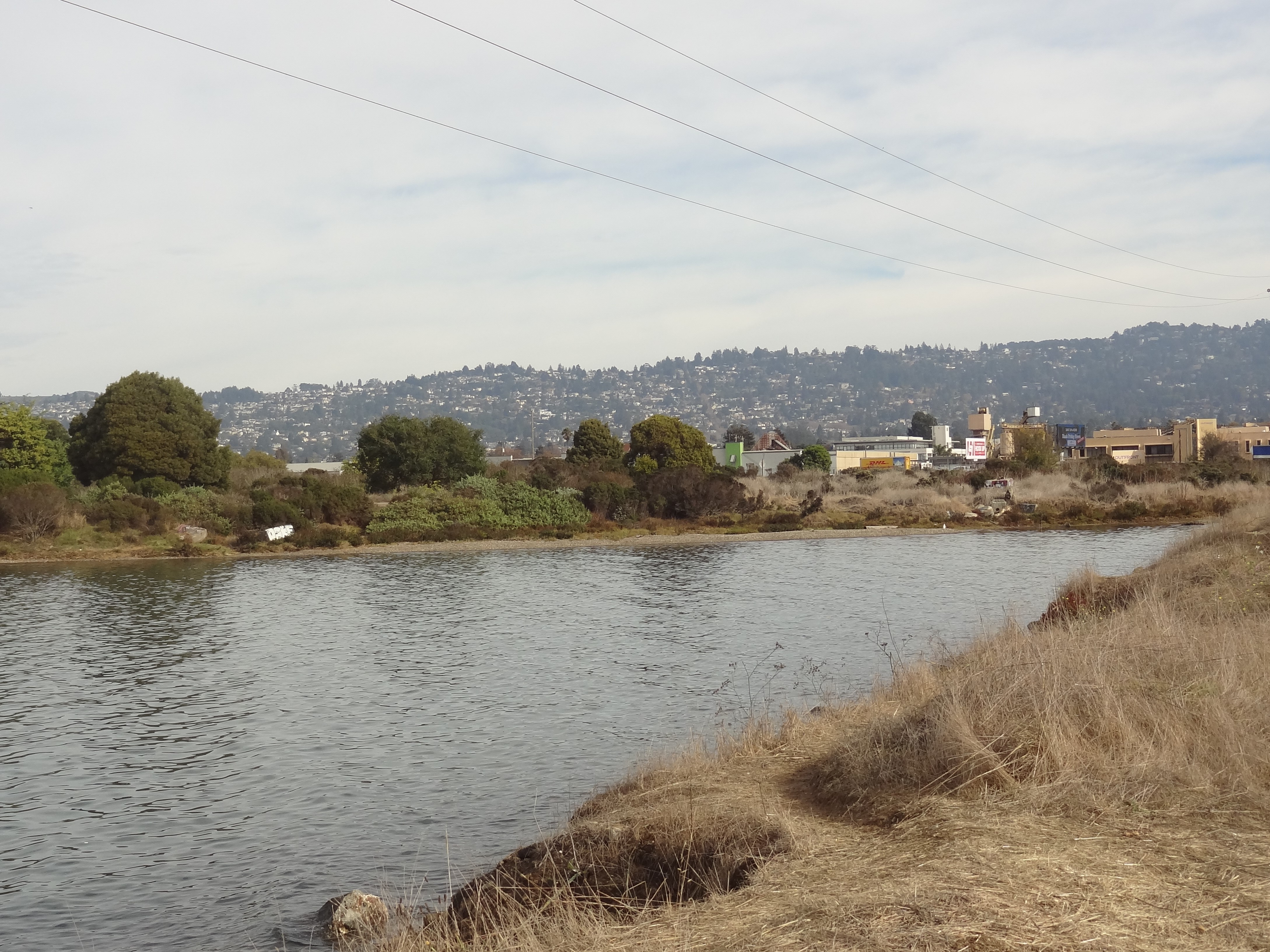
Schoolhouse Creek, Alameda County, California

Schoolhouse Creek is a creek which flows through the city of Berkeley, California in the San Francisco Bay Area.

== History ==
The creek acquired its name from a school which was sited adjacent to it, the Ocean View School (the first school in today's Berkeley, established 1856 on land donated by José Domingo Peralta). The school was later replaced by the San Pablo Avenue School and still later, the Franklin Elementary School. In 2003, Franklin was closed, and in 2004, the Berkeley Adult School moved into its remodeled buildings. On this site at the corner of Curtis and Virginia Streets, a small park created by citizen volunteers, the Schoolhouse Creek Common, was opened on May 13, 2006.

Schoolhouse Creek rises in the Berkeley Hills from a number of small springs just south of Codornices Creek and north of Cedar Street. Its principal tributary, Lincoln Creek begins in the hills at the top of Virginia Street. Schoolhouse and Lincoln have their confluence in the vicinity of McGee and Cedar Streets on the flatlands below the hills. From there the creek runs southwest between Virginia and Cedar Streets. Throughout most of its upper and middle courses, the creek is culverted. It emerges for part of the block between Sacramento and Acton Streets, above Chestnut Street, and again at Curtis Street. Where it crosses the old right-of-way of the Santa Fe railroad, now a pedestrian-bicycle trail, a massive buried concrete abutment and culvert hide the creek.

== Watershed ==
Originally, the creek flowed into the south end of a large, northward-flowing salt marsh and slough that also carried waters of Codornices and Marin Creeks to San Francisco Bay. West of this marsh, low dunes and a crescent of sandy beach curved northwest to Fleming Point. But the marsh was filled, the creek was channeled into a pipe that also carried sewage to the Bay, and the shoreline was extended westward with Berkeley's garbage.

East Bay Municipal District intercepted the sewage in the late 1940s, but the creek still flows in the pipe just north of and parallel to Virginia Street, reaching San Francisco Bay in the squared off "North Basin" that was destined to be filled by more garbage, before citizen effort halted Bay fill in the 1960s.

This shoreline is now part of Eastshore State Park, managed by East Bay Regional Park District. The long-term plan for the park contemplates daylighting the creek here to create a small salt marsh that would also lessen flood danger in West Berkeley. Friends of Five Creeks, a volunteer group, does maintenance and revegetation work in this area.

== See also ==
- Codornices Creek
- List of watercourses in the San Francisco Bay Area
- Strawberry Creek
- Temescal Creek
