= Codornices Creek =

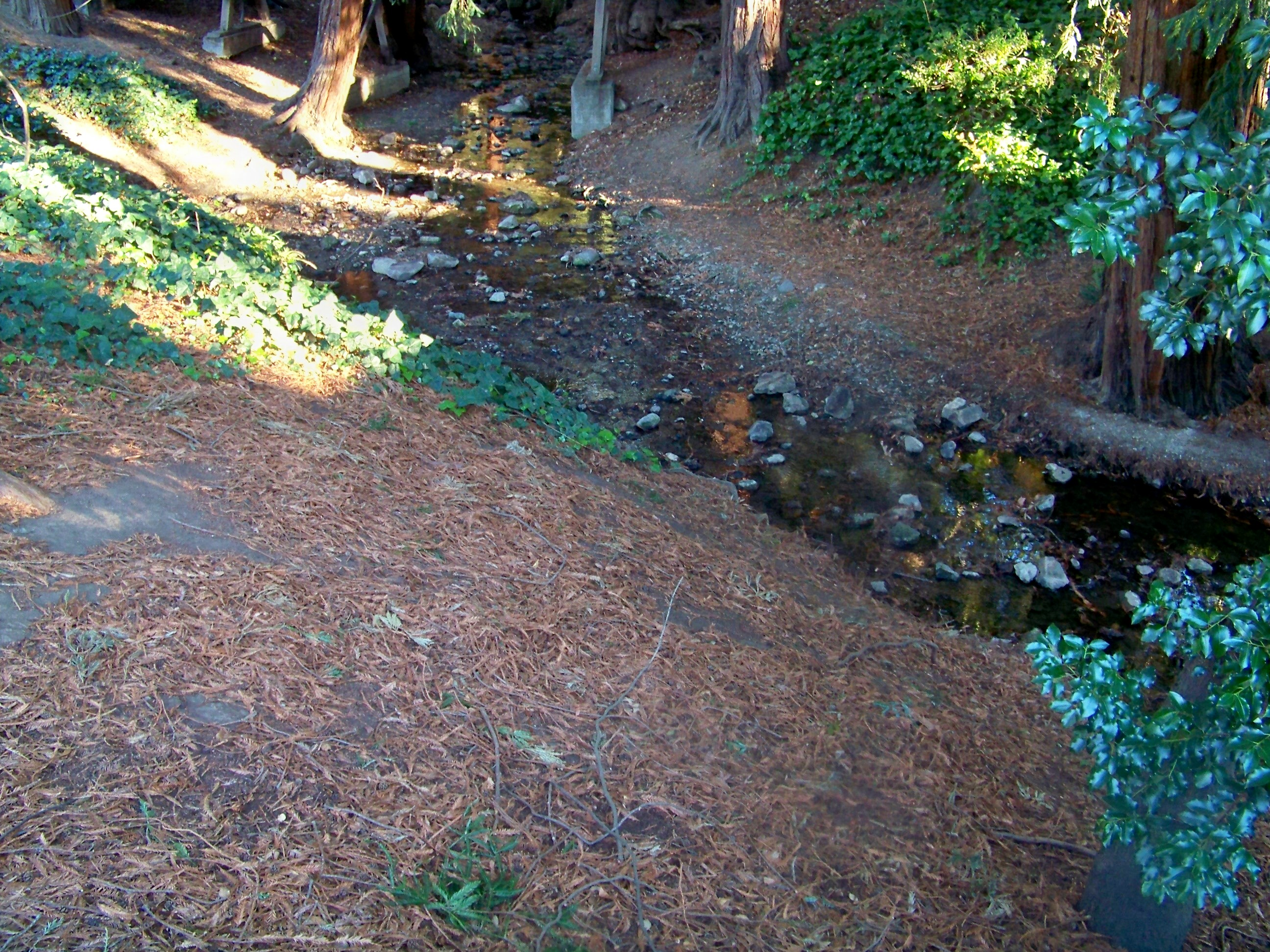
- Codornices Creek at Live Oak Park in Berkeley, California

- Location of the mouth of Codornices Creek in California
- Etymology: codornices, Spanish for quails

Location
- Country: United States
- State: California
- Region: Alameda County
- Cities: Albany, Berkeley

Physical characteristics
- Source: Berkeley Hills
- Mouth: San Francisco Bay
  - location: Golden Gate Fields
  - coordinates: 37°53′17″N 122°18′35″W
  - elevation: 0 ft (0 m)

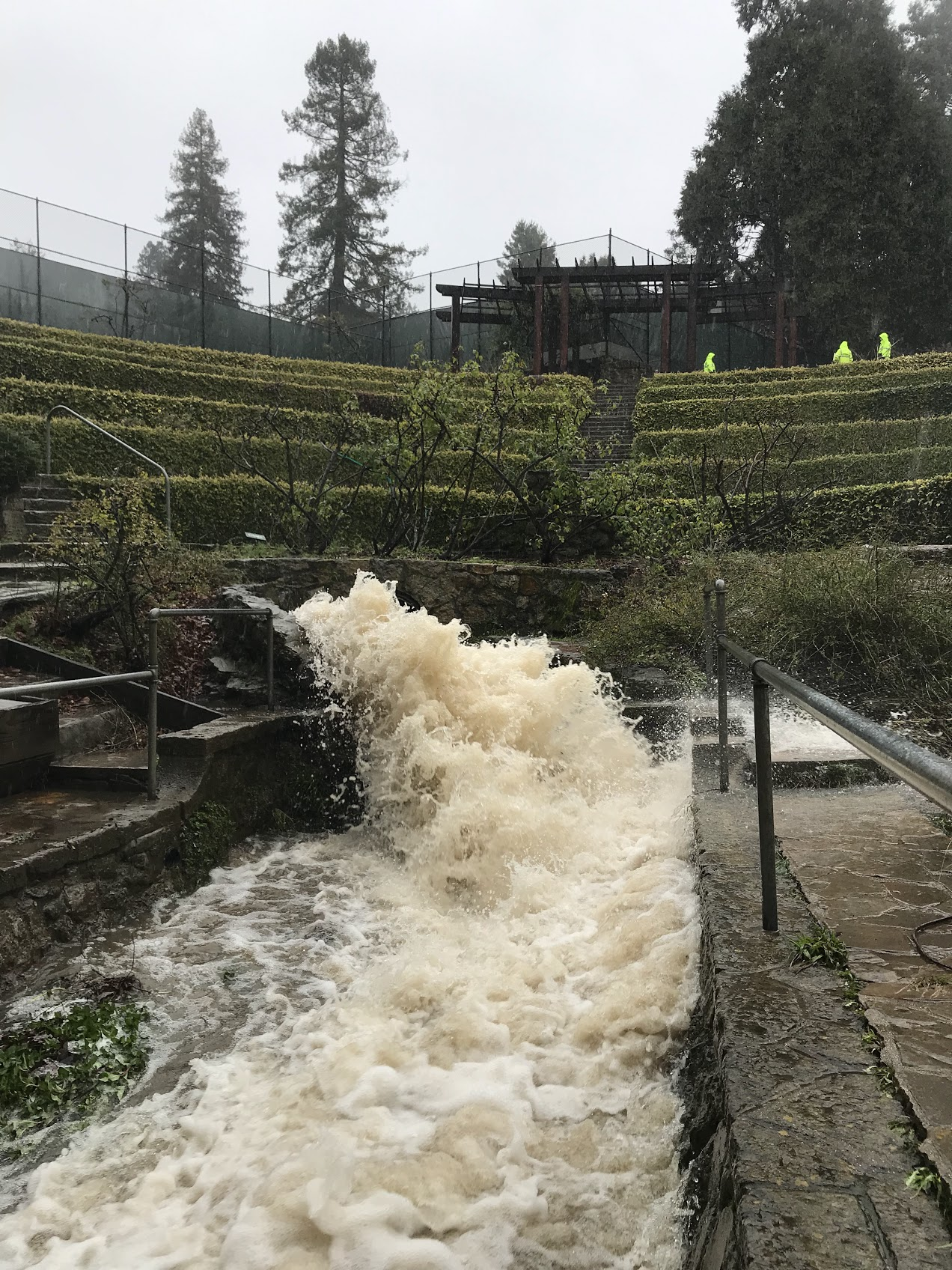
Cordonices Creek is a feature at the base of the Berkeley Rose Garden. This image shows heavy rains and the culvert.

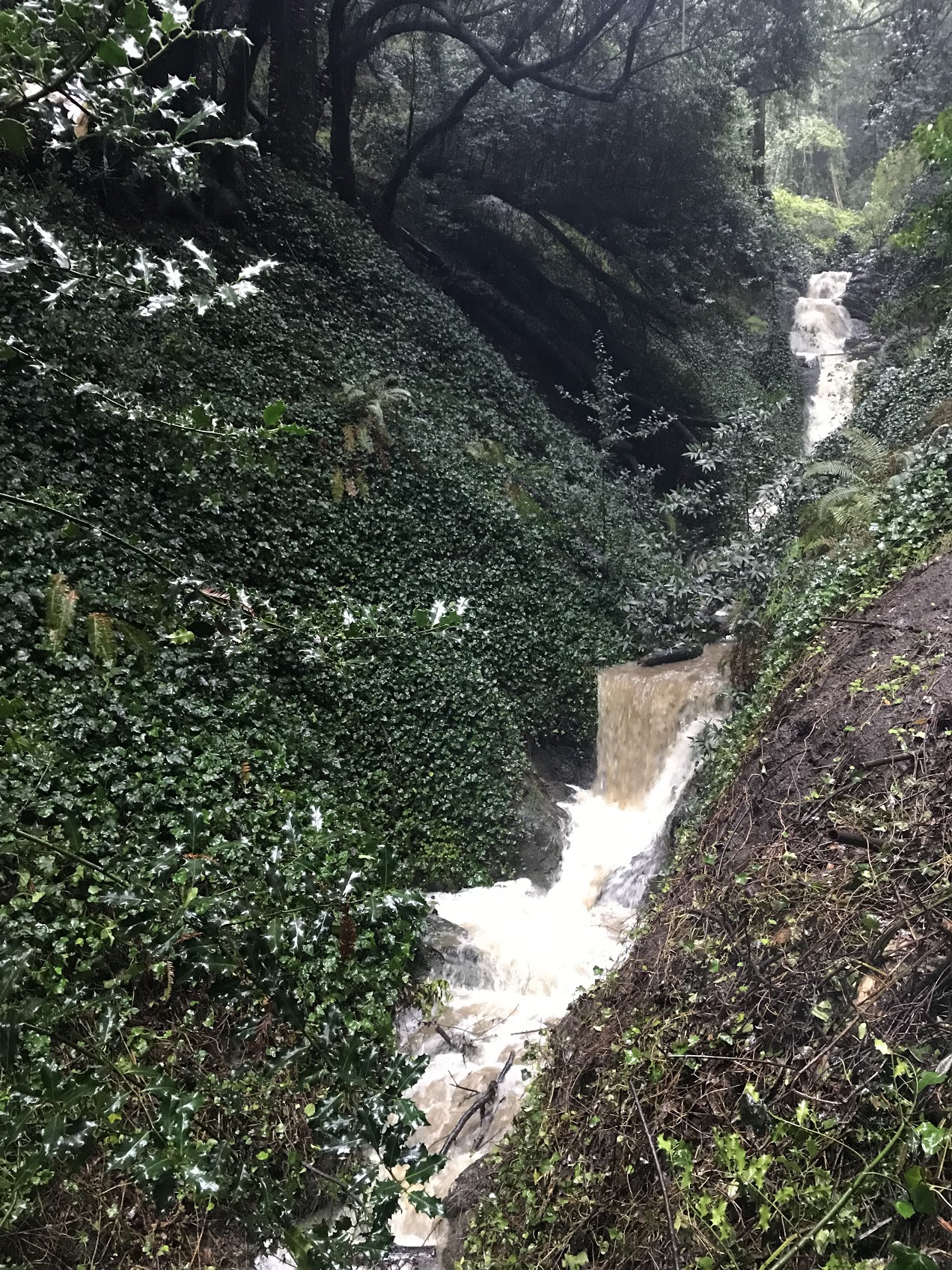
Heavy rains in 2019 near the waterfall section by Tamalpais Street

Codornices Creek (sometimes spelled and/or pronounced "Cordonices"), 2.0 miles (3.2 km) long, is one of the principal creeks which runs out of the Berkeley Hills in the East Bay area of the San Francisco Bay Area in California. In its upper stretch, it passes entirely within the city limits of Berkeley, and marks the city limit with the adjacent city of Albany in its lower section. As a watershed, the creek drains 1.1 miles of land into the ocean. Before European settlement, Codornices probably had no direct, permanent connection to San Francisco Bay. Like many other small creeks, it filtered through what early maps show as grassland to a large, northward-running salt marsh and slough that also carried waters from Marin Creek and Schoolhouse Creek. A channel was cut through in the 19th century, and Codornices flows directly to San Francisco Bay by way of a narrow remnant slough adjacent to Golden Gate Fields racetrack.

== Colonial period to 1900 ==
The name derives from the Spanish word "codornices", meaning "quails". California valley quail were once common in the area. The name was given by one of the Peraltas, owners of the 48,000 acre Rancho San Antonio. Luis Maria Peralta, military governor at San Jose, divided the land grant among his sons, giving the area that now is Berkeley and Albany to Domingo, who built his home on the banks of Codornices Creek near present-day Albina Street.

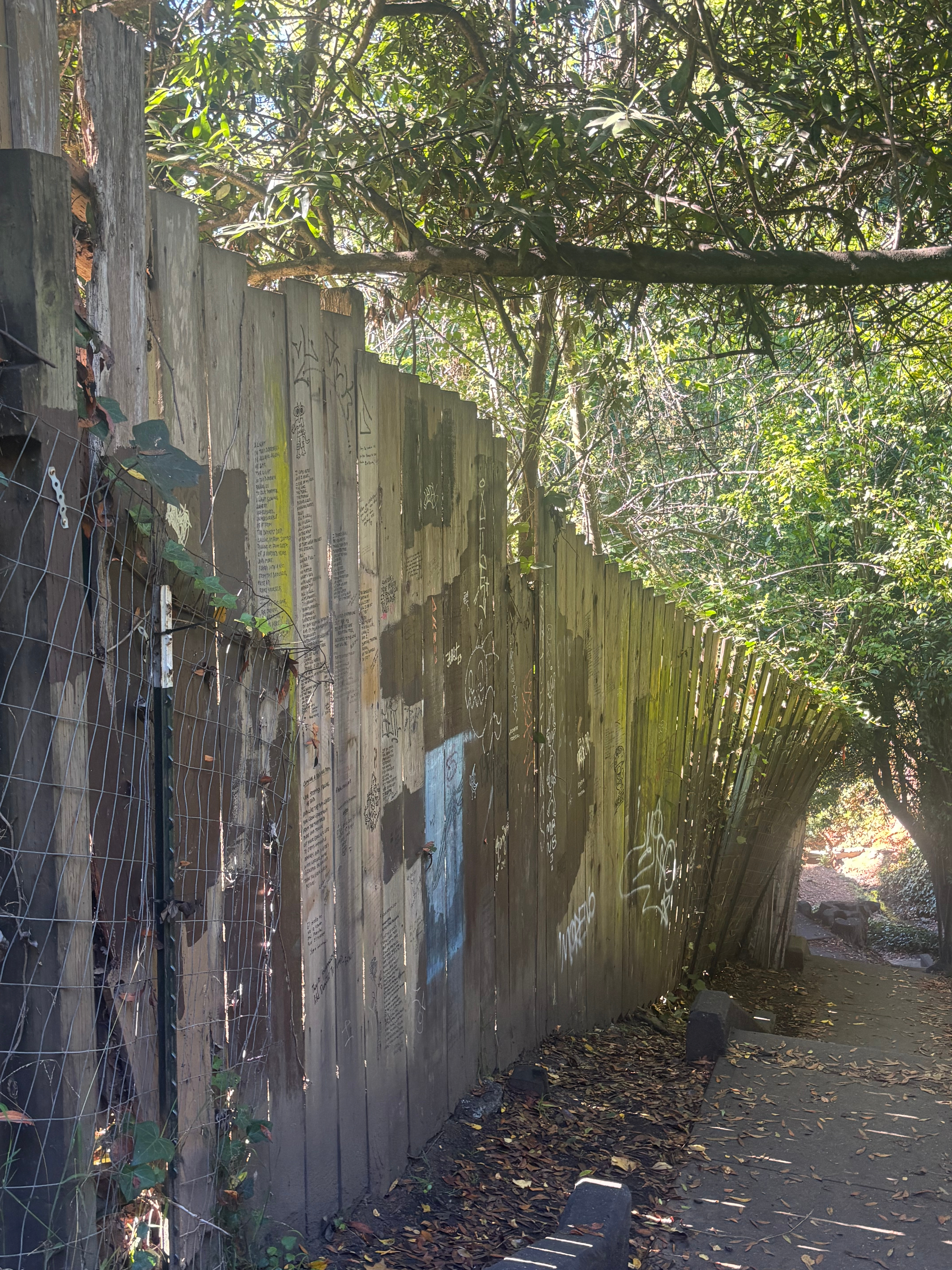
Fence that leads up to waterfall section of creek is marked with graffiti and poetry.

The first of his dwellings was an adobe which was destroyed in the 1868 Hayward earthquake on October 21, 1868. He replaced it with a wooden structure which was razed in the 1930s for an apartment building. Both were located on the high banks of Codornices Creek across from the site of what today is St. Mary's College High School (Roman Catholic) near the Westbrae district of Berkeley.

In the 19th century, a quarry was opened at one of the heads of Codornices Creek in the La Loma district. It was replaced by a city park in the late 1960s. Another feeder comes down from Remillard Park. Others, on private land, have small waterfalls.

Napoleon Bonaparte Byrne, a wealthy Missourian who crossed the plains before the Civil War, attempted to farm along the creek and built his large home (burned in the 1980s) on the south bank of the creek above today's Oxford Street. The Byrne family was accompanied by two freed slaves, believed to have been Berkeley's earliest African American residents. Byrne's property was later acquired by Henry Berryman, a developer who in 1877 built Berryman Reservoir south of today's Codornices Park, above Euclid. The reservoir became part of the East Bay Municipal Utility District system and was enlarged and covered, but has been drained because of fears it might rupture in an earthquake. In 2010 construction was begun on a replacement, a large tank on the site which was put into service in 2013.

== Early 20th century ==
From 1912 to 1928, a 275-foot-long wooden streetcar and road trestle spanned Codornices Creek along Euclid Avenue. In 1928, the trestle was filled in and a culvert laid through it for the creek.

Codornices Creek was recognized early for its beauty. In 1914, the Berkeley City Council voted to acquire Live Oak Park (north of Rose Street between Shattuck and Oxford) as Berkeley's first "nature park." In 1915, Codornices Park was opened along the east side of Euclid Avenue. In that streetcar era, both parks had busy club houses (now gone; Live Oak's was replaced by the current community center) and large picnic areas with stone fireplaces (still existing). Across Euclid from this park, the WPA constructed the Berkeley Rose Garden during the 1930s.

The creek flowed by Fleming Point, a promontory along the coasts of Albany that was demolished and flattened in 1939 to make room for the Golden Gate Fields Racetrack.

The creek once flowed into a swimming hole below today's Henry Street, but today enters a culvert above Henry. This culvert was installed to carry the creek under the extensive fill emplaced along Henry Street by the Southern Pacific when it extended the Berkeley Branch steam line for its new East Bay Electric Lines. Much of the material used for the fill came from the excavation of the nearby Northbrae Tunnel (constructed 1910 by the Southern Pacific). For a time before the fill was emplaced, a wooden trestle also spanned the creek in this locale. Later, a steel bridge spanned a gap left in the fill over Eunice Street. The overcrossing was removed in 1959–60 after the Key System ceased running its F-train here in April 1958, and more fill was added to bring the uphill portion of Eunice up to the level of Henry Street. The lower portion of Eunice now deadends at a retaining wall below Henry.

Downstream, Berkeley's first zoning designated the marshy area near the creek and railroad tracks for "noxious industries." In the 1920s, the city built a garbage incinerator just south of the creek channel at Second Street, across from today's city Transfer Station. The incinerator failed, and the building became a slaughterhouse. (Today it is an official historic landmark, part of a storage company.) Other industries edging the creek included a gas plant and scrap-metal yard.

== Late 20th to early 21st century ==
Codornices Creek may have escaped burial in pipes because much of it formed the Berkeley–Albany border, making projects complicated. It is Berkeley's most intact creek, in and out of culverts, mostly at streets. Some of the longer covered portions are below Neilson Street, San Pablo Avenue, Eastshore Highway, and Interstate 80. The creek exits this last culvert into a narrow tidal slough—the remnant of the former salt marsh - that makes a right turn to follow between Golden Gate Fields Racetrack and the I-80/I-580 freeway, following the creek's original northward course to San Francisco Bay. Just south of Buchanan Street in Albany, this channel widens into a small salt marsh. This marsh in turn empties into the Albany tide flats and San Francisco Bay via four pipes under Buchanan Street.

After a brief post-World War II boom, the industries that had polluted the lower creek began to wither. The University of California bought the housing that had been used for shipyard workers and then returning G.I.s, and used it for student families. Contemplating expansion, the university had creek meanders straightened in the 1960s. But it was then largely left alone, its increasingly cleaner water shaded by volunteer bushes and trees. Upstream, water quality also improved by better sewer systems and, as the environmental movement got started, public education about keeping pollutants out of storm drains. Most of the channel was deeply incised and overgrown, making for cool water and undisturbed habitat. At some unknown time, perhaps in the 1980s, steelhead trout (Oncorhynchus mykiss) found their way to the creek and began to reproduce.

Citizen work to restore the creek began in the 1970s with planting of natives at Codornices Park by Los Amigos de Codornices. In 1995, efforts of the nonprofit Urban Creeks Council and Richard Register's Ecocity Builders led to a block of the creek between Eighth and Ninth Streets being "daylighted"—that is, removed from a culvert. In the late 1990s, the volunteer group Friends of Five Creeks, planting natives at the Bay Area Rapid Transit (BART) crossing, discovered the return of the steelhead/rainbow trout. This encouraged further restoration, notably below Albina Street adjacent to St. Mary's College High School, carried out by the Urban Creeks Council in 2007.

In the late 1990s, the University of California Berkeley needed to replace the World War II-era student-family housing. Stricter regulations and the need for flood control led to a collaboration with the City of Albany and, to a lesser extent, Berkeley, aimed at giving the creek a more meandering channel, with native plantings, along the south edge of University Village.

By 2010, restoration extended from the Union Pacific tracks upstream to the earlier restoration at Eighth Street. There are hopes to extend it to San Pablo Avenue, and to restore a shorter portion just upstream at Kains Street, creating a mini-park next to subsidized housing. If Golden Gate Fields racetrack were to move, some of the large salt marsh could be restored in its place.

In April 2019, many fish in the creek were killed by retardant foam used by Berkeley firefighters to prevent a gas-tank explosion.

In 2022, a $1 million project named “Kains Avenue Park” was unveiled by the City of Berkeley, with financial support from the Department of Water Resources and the Urban Streams Restoration Program. The project consisted of restoration and landscaping along 181 feet of the creek.

In 2025, an encampment along the banks of Codornices Creek caught fire, scorching more than 1500 feet of land along the creek.

A portion of the creek that features a waterfall, sometimes referred to as Benner Falls, is within private property, no longer accessible to the public. The path leading to this waterfall, Tamalpais Path, is maintained by the Berkeley Path Wanderers Association.

== Ecology ==
The creek's steelhead trout population climbed to some 500 individuals by 2006 according to surveys.

On December 3, 2012, a Chinook salmon (Oncorhynchus tshawytscha) was videotaped in the creek, the first sighting in recent history.

== See also ==
- Cerrito Creek
- Schoolhouse Creek
- Strawberry Creek
- Temescal Creek
- List of watercourses in the San Francisco Bay Area
