= Albany Bulb =

Former landfill in Albany, California

Coordinates: 37°53′24″N 122°19′29″W

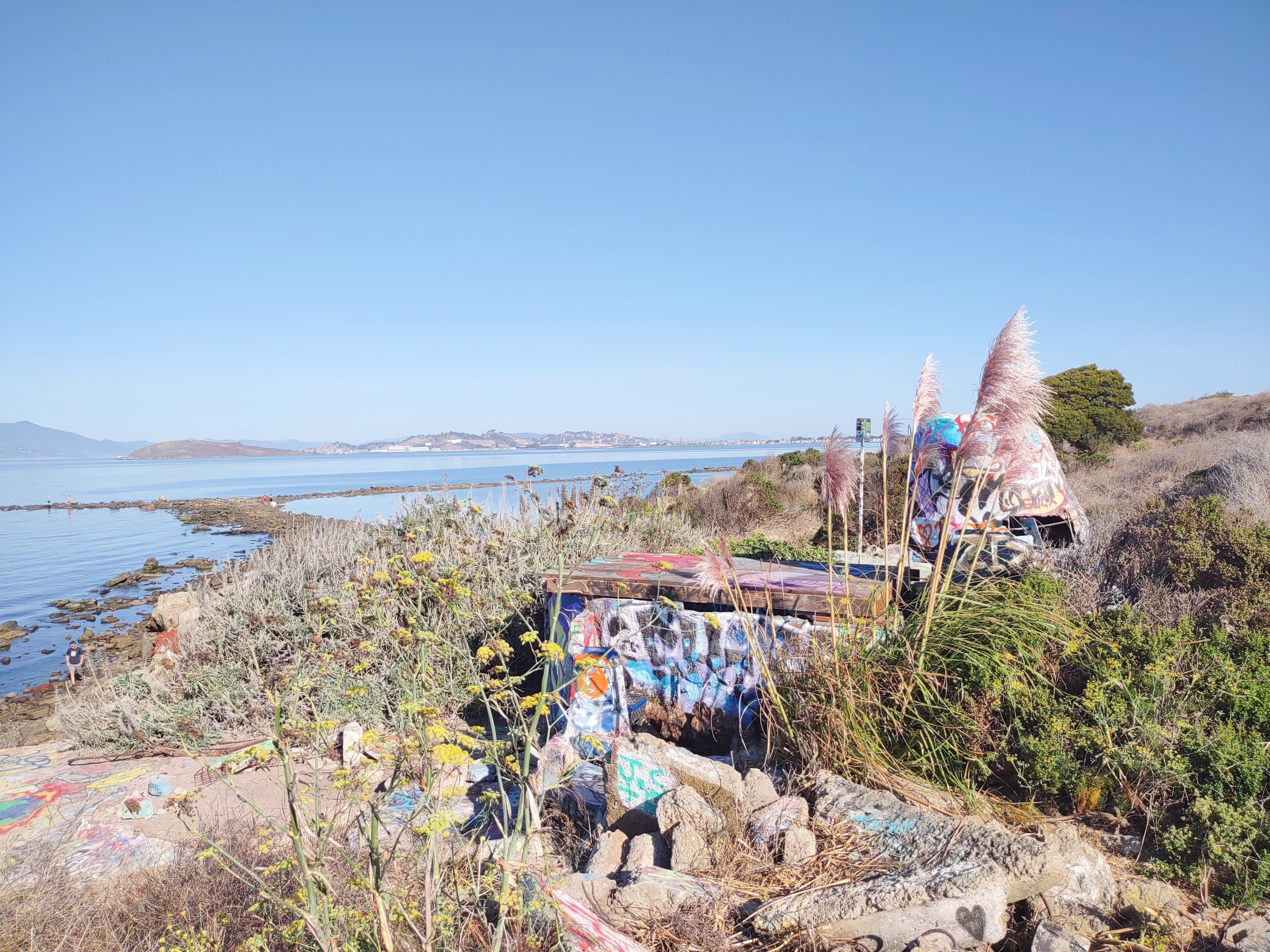
Albany Bulb looking toward the bay.

The Albany Bulb (also simply known as The Bulb) is a former landfill largely owned by the City of Albany, in California. The Bulb is the west end of a landfill peninsula jutting west from the east shore of San Francisco Bay. The term "Bulb" is often used to refer to the entire peninsula, which includes the Albany Plateau, north of Buchanan Street at its base; the high narrow "Neck," and the round "Bulb." The Bulb is part of the City of Albany, and can be reached via Buchanan Street or the Bay Trail along the east side of San Francisco Bay. Landmarks include Mary's Mask, Gritchell's Bay, and Mad Marc's Castle.

== History ==
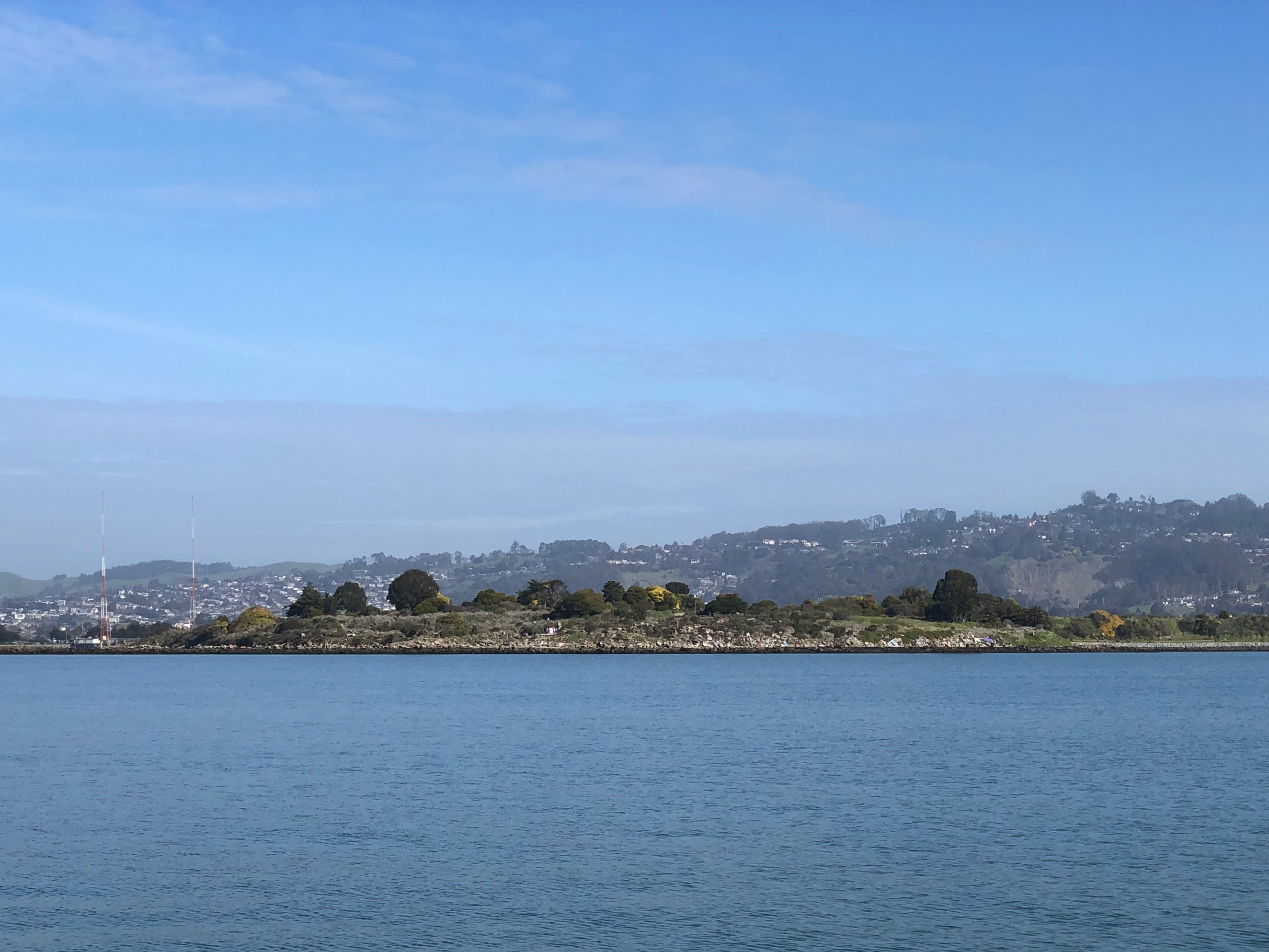
Albany Bulb seen from the bay

Like the Point Isabel peninsula to the north and the Berkeley Marina, Point Emery, and Emeryville Marina Peninsulas to the south, the Bulb peninsula is a relic of almost a century of systematic filling of the shallow Bay and its adjacent wetland. The development dream was to join the peninsulas, leaving a narrow shipping channel edged by commerce.

The tidelands off Berkeley and Albany were sold by the state of California in the 1870s, as railroads extended tracks northward along the waterfront from the Oakland terminus of the Transcontinental Railroad. (These tracks soon became the main transcontinental line.) Early in the 20th century, the tidelands were acquired by the rival Santa Fe Railroad.

Creation of the Bulb peninsula can be said to have begun in 1939, when the Santa Fe Railroad dynamited El Cerrito del Sur, the low hill on Fleming Point southwest of Albany Hill, to build Golden Gate Fields race track. The debris was pushed into the Bay to create parking lots. Almost immediately afterward, the City of Albany extended Buchanan Street west on Bay fill, creating a lagoon between Buchanan and the north edge of the race track. Aerial photos show the gradual filling of this lagoon at the same time that dumping extended the peninsula west into the Bay and, later, north onto the Plateau. The small salt marsh south of Buchanan, fed by Codornices and Village Creeks, grew in the last remnants of the lagoon—an echo of much larger wetlands that once flourished farther south, where the creek waters emptied into the Bay behind the dynamited hill.

The Bulb proper—the round hill at the tip of the peninsula—was created in 1963, after the City of Albany signed a contract with Santa Fe Railroad for the disposal of construction debris. Thus, The Bulb is made of mostly of construction debris such as concrete and rebar, which is still very visible today. The usual fill method was to enclose part of the shallow Bay with rock and concrete rip-rap, fill the created lagoon with garbage and debris, and (usually) top off the lagoon with a layer of clay. However, this filling was largely halted by efforts of Save The Bay from the 1960s to the 1980s. Lawsuits against the landfill operator brought the dumping to a halt in 1983, although the rectangular lagoon at the west end of the Bulb peninsula remains.

The City of Albany entertained a variety of proposals for development of the peninsula, including high-rise hotels and a marina. In 2002, however, 17 years of effort by Citizens for Eastshore State Park (now Citizens for Eastshore Parks) resulted in the Plateau and lower Neck, along with shoreline to the north and south, becoming part of The Eastshore State Park. The City of Albany maintains ownership of The Bulb itself, but continues to negotiate to have the State Parks Department (owners of the park) and/or East Bay Regional Park District (managers of the park and owners of some adjacent shoreline) take over The Bulb. Other entities are reluctant due to liability and potential costs of making the area, with its projecting concrete and rebar, "safe." Meanwhile, the Bulb area and adjacent Albany Beach have become one of the most heavily used outdoor recreation sites in the Bay.

== Natural conditions and ecology ==
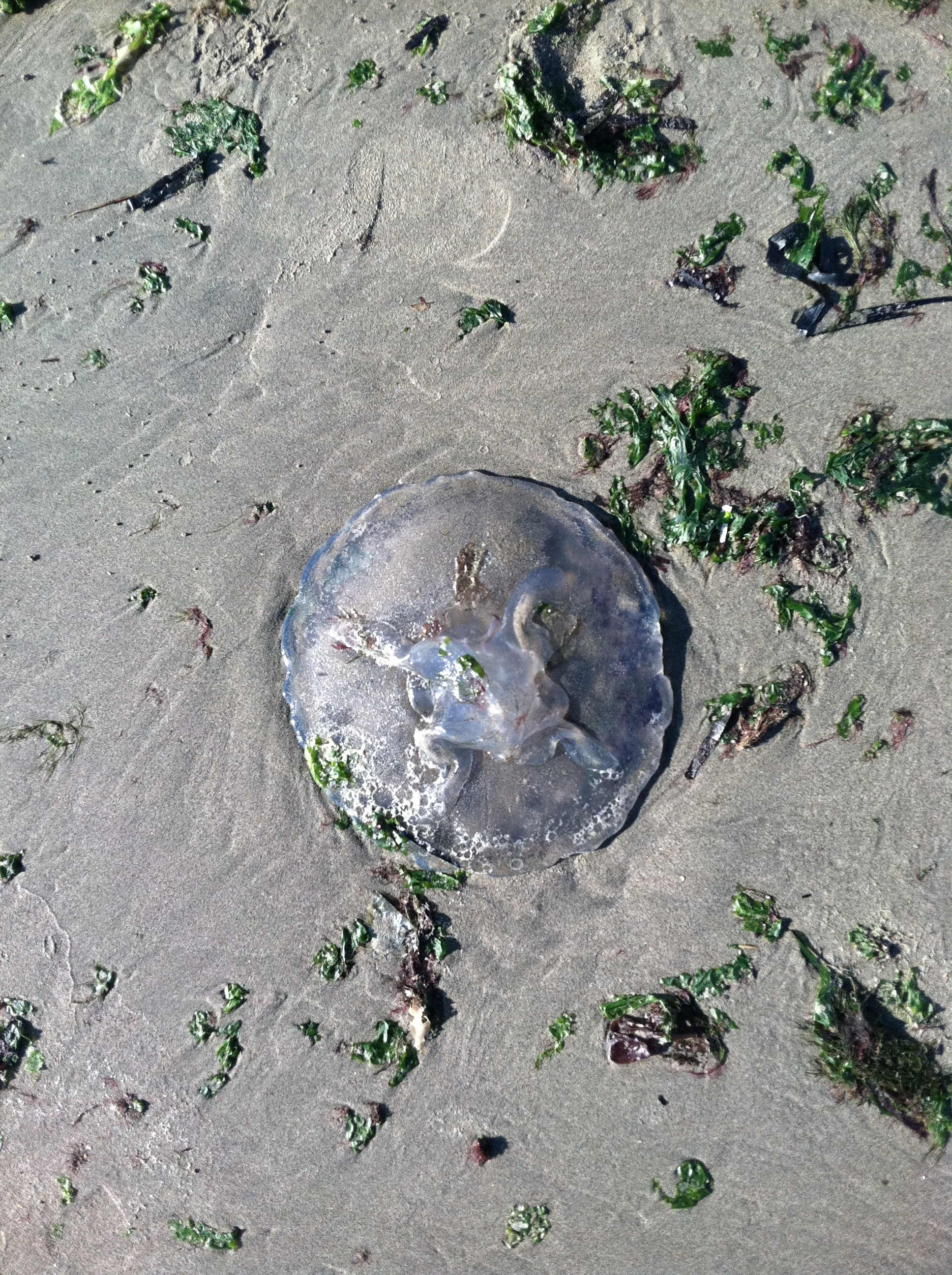
A beached jellyfish and kelp on the sandy shore of the Bulb

San Francisco Bay currents were altered by creation of The Bulb and as well as the fill peninsulas to the north and south. (While Point Isabel is naturally occurring, its hill was dynamited in the 1950s, and marshes between it and the mainland were filled). Thus, one result of The Bulb has been westward extension of tidal mudflats at the mouths of Codornices, Village, and Marin Creeks, between the Bulb peninsula and Point Isabel. These are known as the Albany Mudflats, and are important habitat for waterfowl and shorebirds. The wooden posts in the area often serve as perches for peregrine falcons and ospreys eating their catches.

Another result of The Bulb's creation was the formation of Albany Beach, composed of low dunes and a sandy beach running south between the Bulb peninsula and Fleming Point. Sandy beaches are rare along the San Francisco Bay, but strong tidal currents to and from the Golden Gate tend to create them along the Berkeley and Albany shorelines. The beach has been heavily used by dog owners for decades.

Albany Bulb’s landscape consists of landfill materials such as rebar, rubble, and driftwood that has been repurposed by artists and has remained a part of the park’s local identity. Under the regulatory protocol of CalRecycle and the Alameda County Local Enforcement Agency, The Bulb undergoes regular inspections for hazardous contaminants that may put the site’s waterfront at risk. According to these studies, no significant threats have been detected, which has allowed the site to remain uncapped and has enabled exposed landfill items to persist as a feature of the topography.

The Bulb features a moderate climate with average yearly temperatures of around 64.9 °F. Strong winds make the water south of the Bulb peninsula, off the beach, popular with wind- and kite- surfers. The sheltered lagoon at the west end is a calm-water refuge during storms, and shorebirds use its riprap edge at high tide. A majority of the landmass consists of upland ruderal/coastal scrub habitats, with muted tidal aquatic and tidal mudflat areas around the coasts.

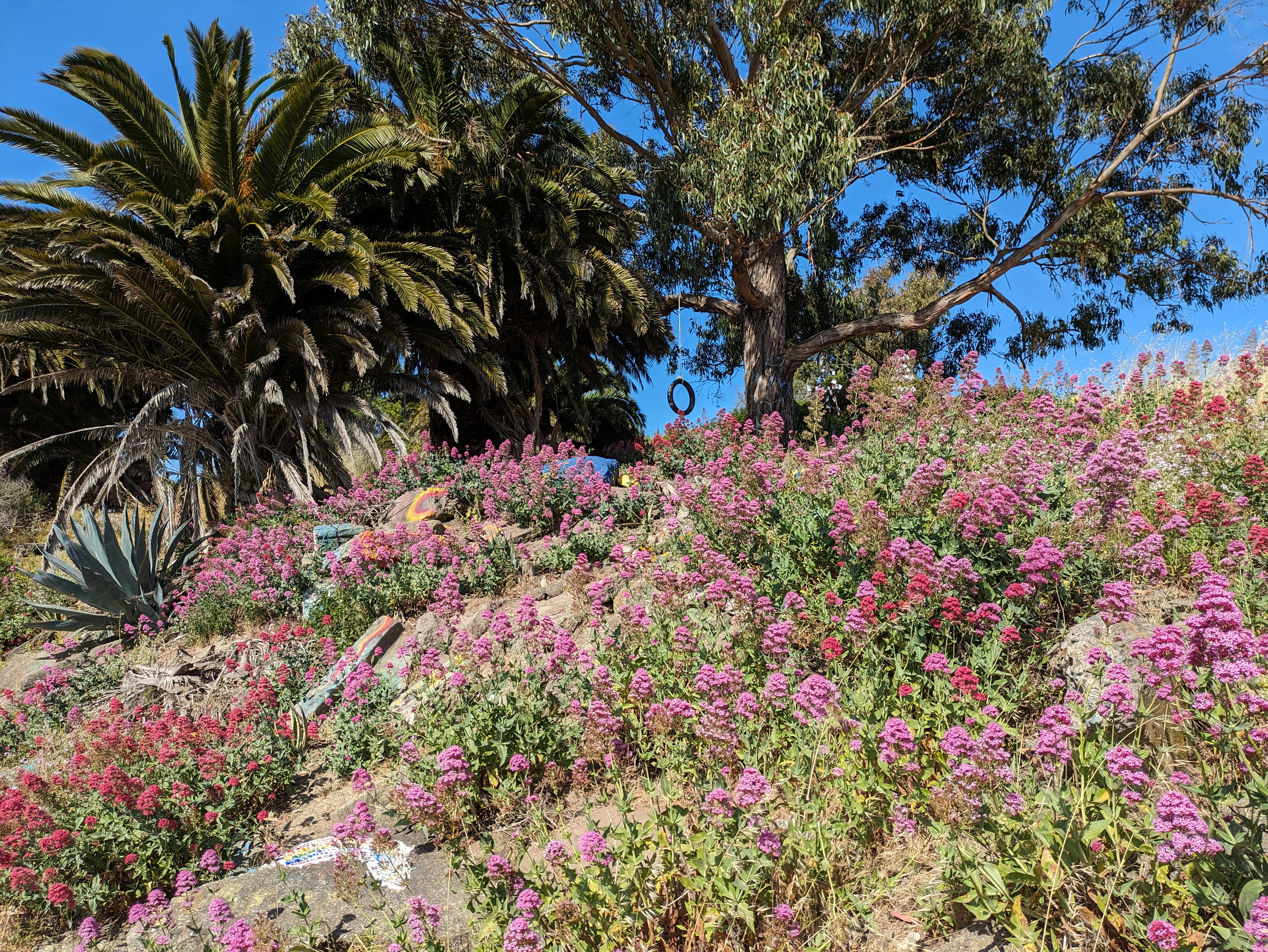
Flowers and trees on the Bulb

Like other abandoned dumps, The Bulb became quickly vegetated. Non-native grasses and weeds compose a majority of the plant cover, with around three times as many non-native species as native species in the area. Prevalent non-native species include yellow star-thistle, pampas grass, harding grass and fennel, but native vegetation such as pickleweed, salt grass, and common reed also grow on The Bulb. A transition study conducted by the City of Albany Council from 2015–2016 concluded that several non-native invasive species such as pampas grass, English ivy, French broom, and iceplant have been detrimental to The Bulb's wildlife. Eel grass near The Bulb's tip is also an important sub-tidal habitat. The south shore's riprap is largely un-vegetated, but lagoons and some gentler shoreline on the north, facing the Albany Mudflats, have welcomed typical salt-marsh vegetation such as salt grass and gum plant.

The Bulb provides habitat for a variety of wildlife, including songbirds, rats, mice, and black-tailed hares, California ground squirrels as well as rattlesnakes, gopher snakes, hawks and barn owls that feed on them. There is also a significant population of feral domestic cats and off-leash dogs.

With an abundance of songbird, waterfowl, and shorebird species, The Bulb serves as an important habitat for breeding, migration, wintering, and residence. A survey conducted by the Golden Gate Audubon Society in 2015-2016 identified 90 different species using the land. Common sightings according to this survey included the House finch, the White crowned sparrow, the Say’s phoebe, the Townsend’s warbler, the White-tailed kite, and the Golden-crowned sparrow. A number of these birds, like the Townsend's warbler and White-tailed kite, are threatened species according to the National Audubon Society.

The Plateau area, once popular for flying model airplanes, has been partly fenced off to mitigate habitat losses incurred by the construction of sports fields to the south. This area is now a habitat for burrowing owls, which have been identified to winter at the park. In 2016, a birder sighted and photographed at least one burrowing owl being flushed out of the vegetation by dogs, who are not permitted within the closed area. The owl has since been spotted there again, but concerns remain about how dogs may affect this species, which is quickly disappearing as a result of human development.

== Notable features ==
Because The Bulb is geographically unorganized and because the Albany Police Department had for a long period of time been given orders to not enforce the law barring "camping", the Albany Bulb is often described as anarchic. Many groups, including urban artists, otherwise homeless Albany residents, dog walkers and owners, teenagers, and environmentalists use The Bulb area and feel they have a stake in it.

=== Art ===
The Bulb is home to a vast array of urban art forms including mural, stencil, graffiti, sculpture, and installation art. Sniff, an artists' collective active in the 1990s involving Scott Hewitt, Scott Meadows and David Ryan, painted large, highly imaginative "murals" on wood and erected more sculptures on the northwest corner of The Bulb. Sculptor and activist lawyer Osha Neumann has created some of the largest works in the park, such as a sculpture of a female figure composed of scrap wood and metal known locally as the "Beseeching Woman" or "Water Lady" (not official names). He often collaborates with his son-in-law Jason DeAntonis. Another Bulb landmark known as "Mad Marc's Castle," named after its builder, a long-time Bulb resident, is a large concrete, rebar and plaster shelter which sits on the south west corner of The Bulb, directly opposite the Golden Gate Bridge. The structure today serves as a canvas for local graffiti artists. Informal concerts, punk parties, and even a 2006 production of Shakespeare's The Tempest presented by We Players, a Bay Area site-specific theatre company, have been hosted in an amphitheater on the site constructed using landfill materials.

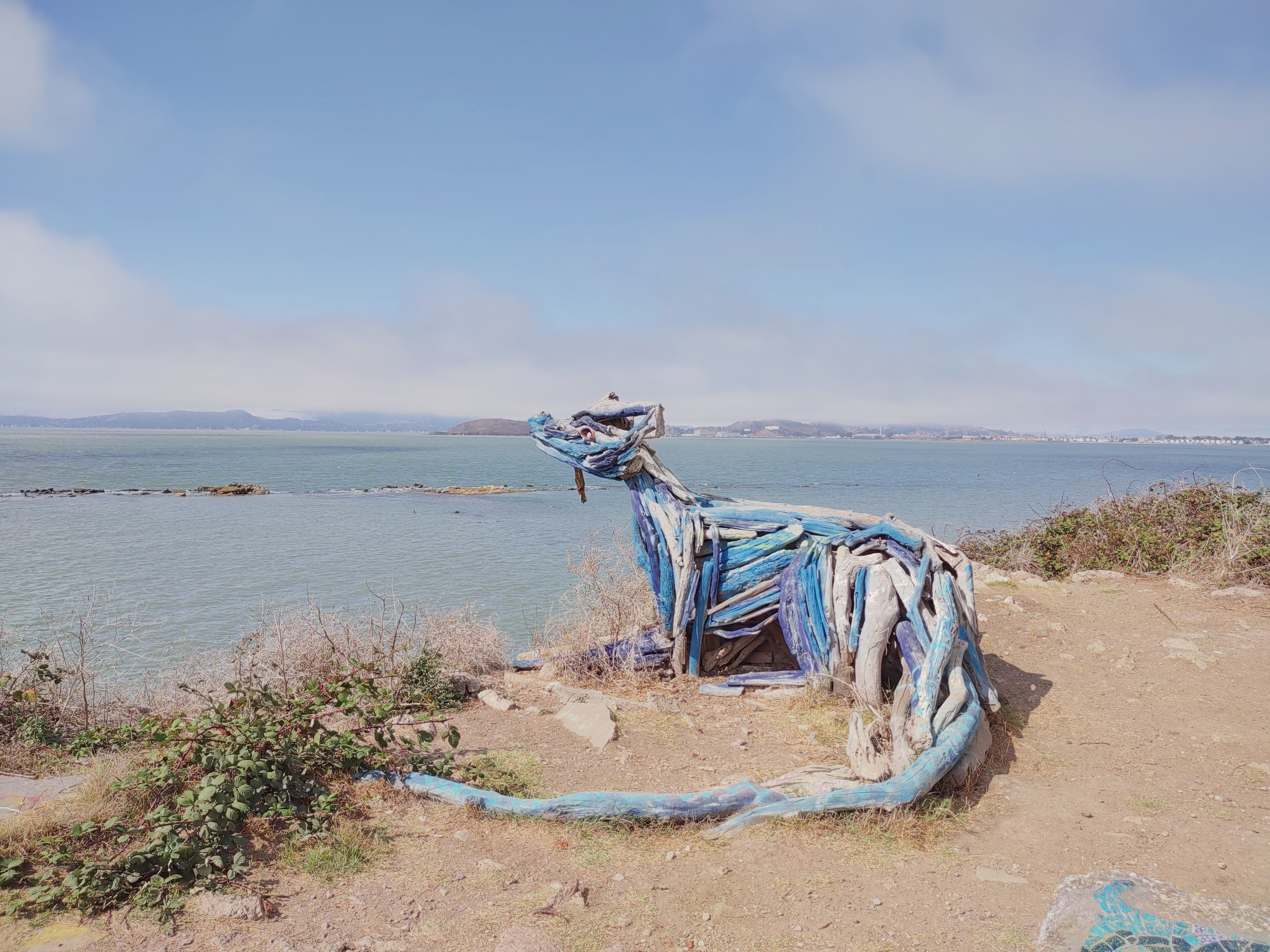
Art in Albany bulb

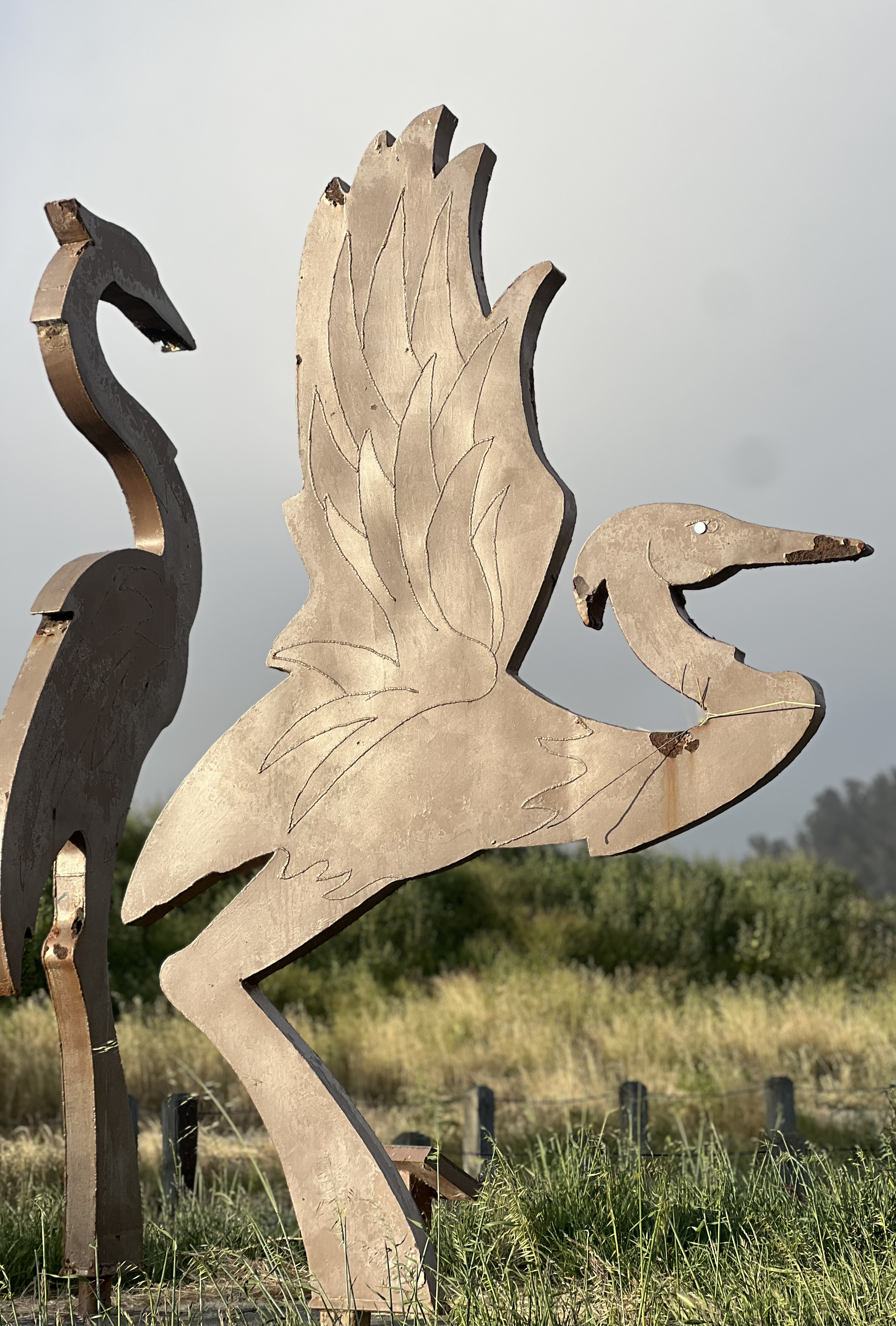
Crane Sculpture at the entrance of the park

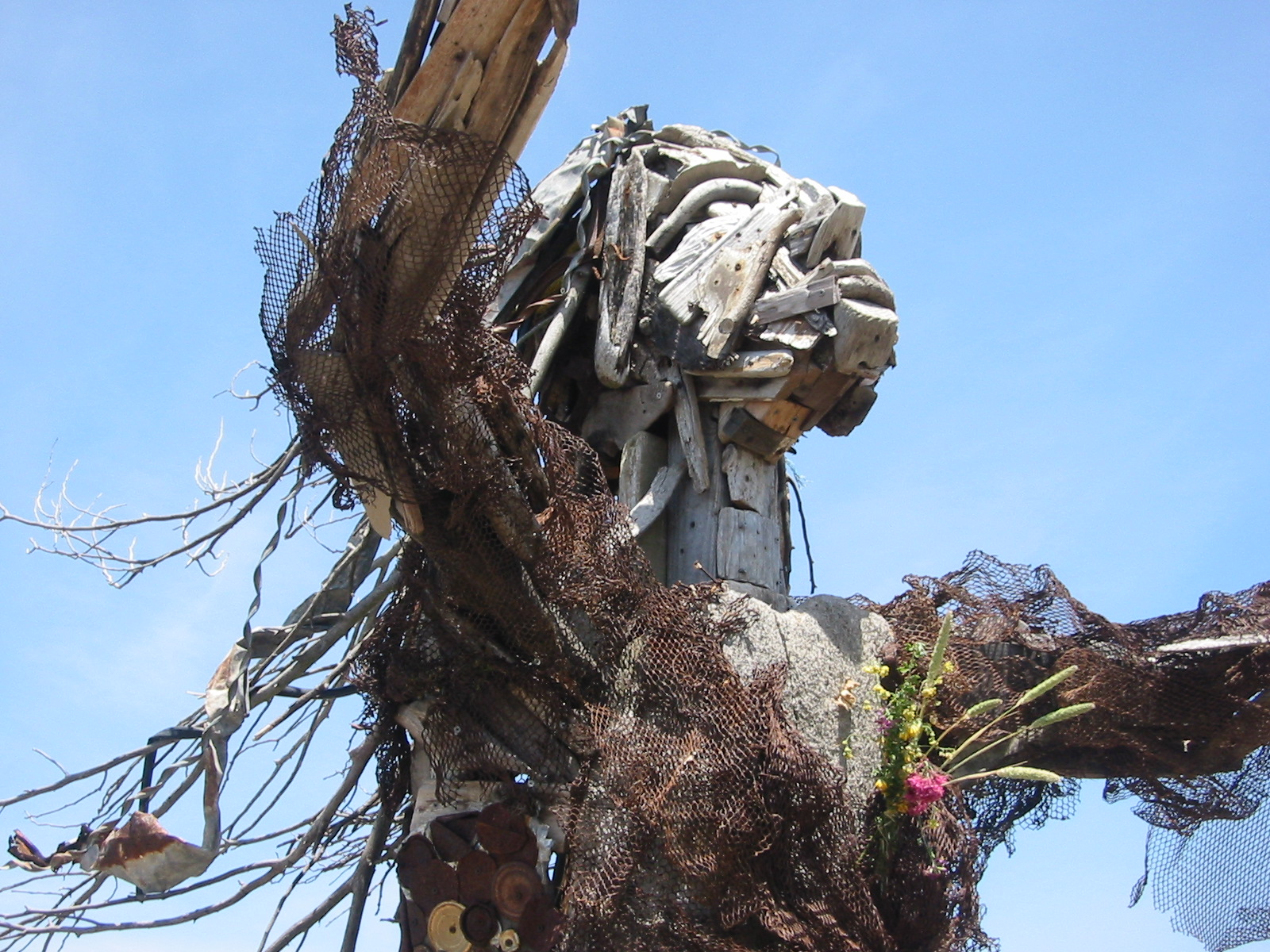
Sculpture using found materials at Albany Bulb

=== Library ===
The Bulb was formerly home to a small, makeshift library, assembled mostly from driftwood and old boat pieces. The Landfill Library comprised, on average, 300 volumes in various conditions, donated by its patrons. The books were free to borrow and keep, although a take-something-leave-something approach was encouraged.

As of August 2013, the library closed due to vandals destroying it. On January 12, 2014, the library burned to the ground after a fire of unknown origin. With the resident squatters gone, it will most likely remain closed.

=== Homeless community ===
Starting in the early 1990s, the Albany Bulb was home to a community of otherwise homeless individuals who lived there on and off for nearly 20 years, despite a lack of official permission from the City of Albany. Their presence was generally tolerated so long as the number of residents remained low. The population living on The Bulb grew to approximately 50 or 60 by early 1999, leading to a mass eviction by the city later that summer. Homeless residents began to filter back over the next few years, including many of those who had been evicted in 1999, and by early 2013, the population had again grown to more than 40. In May 2013, the Albany City Council voted to evict the residents of The Bulb, offering them minimal assistance with relocation to other living arrangements. Ultimately, the city ended up offering 30 Bulb residents $3,000 each to leave their longtime homes on The Bulb in order to settle a lawsuit brought by the East Bay Community Law Center on behalf of the residents. 28 of the 30 plaintiffs accepted the buy-out and voluntarily left by April 24, 2014. Two Bulb residents, Amber Whitson and her partner Phyl Lewis, refused the settlement and the court dismissed their claims without prejudice. On May 29, 2014 at 4:00 am, Albany Police went out onto the Albany Bulb armed with assault rifles and arrested Whitson and Lewis, as well as one supporter, Erik Eisenberg, on charges alleging a violation of California Penal Code 647(e) "lodging".

A documentary about the Albany Landfill Encampment, Bum's Paradise was released in 2003 documenting the 1999 eviction.

More recently, in 2013, Andy Kreamer (a former Bulb resident and aspiring history teacher) released a film called Where Do YOU Go When It Rains? featuring Bulb residents talking candidly about their experiences living on the Albany Bulb.

In 2016, the Albany City Council approved plans to create a city park at The Bulb. Although the agreement holds no legal weight, it sets the foundation for the city to approve budget funds for the park. Further, the main trails were widened and leveled after the 2014 evictions to allow for greater motor vehicle access, police patrols were increased, and vegetation was cut back for several years to prevent further camping.

== Development ==
Environmental protections, as well as an understanding of the dangers of building on unconsolidated fill, make it extremely unlikely that The Bulb could be developed. In 2006, Magna Corporation, the owner of the Golden Gate Fields race track, proposed a large commercial shopping area on the racetrack property southeast of The Bulb. Extensive protest led by Citizens for Eastshore Parks, headed by former Albany mayor Robert Cheasty, led to these plans being dropped, and the future of the racetrack holdings remains uncertain.

Voices to Vision, a two-year study that examined what citizens of Albany desired for the waterfront, concluded in 2010. Fern Tiger Associates, who conducted the study, reported that 62% of residents who participated in the study wanted to expand open space by at least 75 acres. This expansion would mean 163 acres of parkland, trails, and wetlands at the waterfront. The area would include The Bulb, the Golden Gate Fields race track and parking lot, and the Eastshore State Park plateau. However, the study also found that half of participants wanted enough development on the waterfront to maintain the current tax revenue generated from Golden Gate Fields, which is about $1.7 million. 85% of participants reported that building a hotel on the site would be a good idea, with many supporting additional retail and restaurant developments on the site.

A transition study funded by a grant was completed by the City of Albany in 2015 which worked to assess the state of the park and envision strategies for its enhancement. Subsequently, in 2018, voters in western Alameda and Contra Costa Counties passed Measure FF, which committed to allocating funds to general improvements such as habitat protection, visitor facility enhancement, and expansion of personnel.

In 2016, a non-profit organization called “Love the Bulb” was established with the aim of celebrating and protecting the landfill's artistic culture, as well as advocating for environmental interests. In 2018 and 2019, the group hosted an arts and performance festival called “Bulbfest”. The organization has also created a garden of native plant species on the site in collaboration with the City of Albany’s Friends of Albany Parks Program.
