= Citizens for East Shore Parks =

Environmental group in California, US

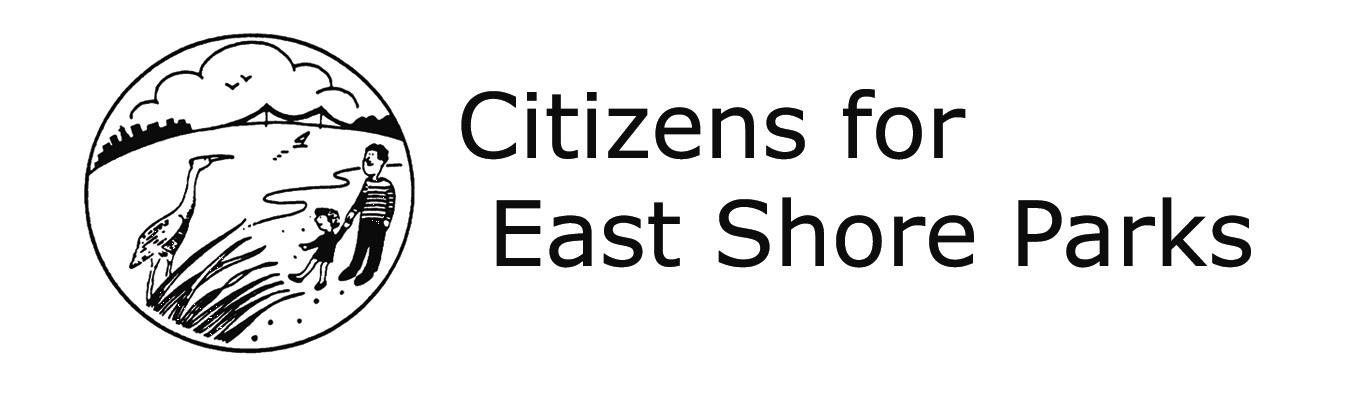
- Abbreviation: CESP
- Founders: Dwight E. Steele, Norman La Force, Sylvia McLaughlin
- Type: Nonprofit
- Legal status: Charity
- Purpose: Open space preservation, Natural habitat restoration, Environmental justice
- Location: Albany, California, USA
- Region served: East Bay (San Francisco Bay Area)
- Members: 3,000
- President: Shirley Dean
- Executive Director: Robert Cheasty
- Website: www.eastshorepark.org

Citizens for East Shore Parks (CESP) is a United States environmental organization that focuses on the acquisition and preservation of parkland in the San Francisco Bay Area. CESP works to protect open space along the East Bay shoreline for natural habitat and recreational purposes through a combination of advocacy, education, and outreach. Since its founding in 1985, CESP has worked to secure approximately 1,800 acres (730 ha) of public land, primarily through the creation of the 8.5-mile (13.7 km) long Eastshore State Park in 2002.

== Mission statement ==
The mission of Citizens for East Shore Parks (CESP) is to preserve and enhance the natural resources and recreational and educational opportunities of the east shore of San Francisco Bay, creating a necklace of shoreline parks from the Oakland Estuary to the Carquinez Strait.

== Organization ==
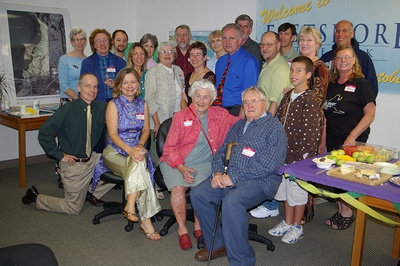
Some CESP Board Members, staff and friends (including Albany Mayor Robert Lieber, Albany Councilmember Marge Atkinson and Berkeley City Councilmember Kriss Worthington) at an open house in the El Cerrito office.

CESP has a twenty-five member volunteer Board of Directors, including prominent community members, environmentalists, and public officials who have a long record of working on behalf of environmental issues in the East Bay. They include Tom Bates, Robert Cheasty, Shirley Dean, Whitney Dotson, Norman La Force, and Sylvia McLaughlin, among others. Most board members also sit on subcommittees addressing specific environmental or operational issues. The board does not include park user groups.

Although the scope of its work is large, CESP operates with a very small staff. There is one executive director who manages day-to-day affairs, as well as interns and volunteers.

== History ==
CESP was founded in 1985 to oppose Santa Fe Railroad’s proposals for large-scale development at the Berkeley and Albany waterfront. Historically, CESP grew from the wider movement among East Bay residents to protect San Francisco Bay and its shoreline from capricious and irresponsible development. A coalition of local environmentalists, public officials, and concerned individuals banded together to form Citizens for the Eastshore State Park, with the original goal of creating a state park that would permanently and strategically preserve the shoreline for public and recreational use.

By 1990, Albany, Berkeley, and Emeryville residents had overwhelmingly approved ballot measures to protect the remaining open space on the shoreline. With its plans stymied, Santa Fe Railroad became interested in selling the land. Citizens for the Eastshore State Park played an important role in the park planning process. CESP helped draft two successful bond measures that would eventually enable the California Department of State Parks and the East Bay Regional Park District to acquire the land and administer the park. Moreover, CESP served as a forum for diverse groups and individuals to agree on a common vision for the shoreline park, as well as an intermediary between the public and public officials.

Controversially, the CESP and Sierra Club vision for Eastshore State Park (its "Conservation and Habitat Restoration Plan," which was also distributed under the names of Golden Gate Audubon Society and Save the Bay) would have restricted recreation on North Point Isabel. North Point Isabel, a former toxic landfill, had been used by park visitors (and serviced by East Bay Regional Park District) as an extension of Point Isabel Regional Shoreline since the mid-1980s. Point Isabel, also a former landfill, is a multi-use park that has allowed off-leash dog walking since 1987. The CESP/Sierra Club plan would have restricted recreation dramatically, requiring dogs to be on-leash on North Point Isabel (thereby reducing off-leash recreation overall from some 50 acres to just 23 acres). Park users mounted a vigorous effort to preserve recreation, submitting 20,000 signatures to state park planners, and when the planners' Preferred Park Concept was presented to the public on March 21, 2002, both Point Isabel and North Point Isabel remained available for off-leash recreation.

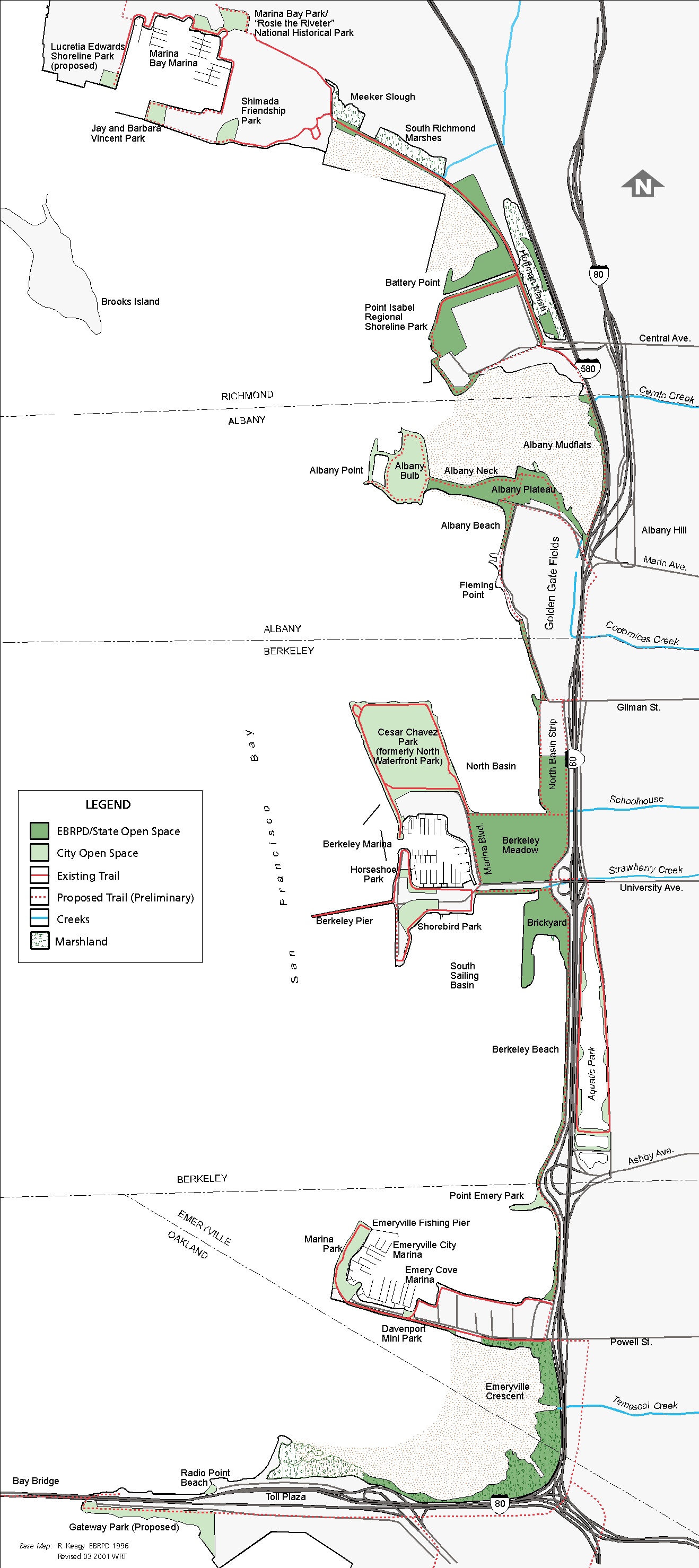
The Eastshore State Parks extends from Richmond to Oakland.

In December 2002, the California Department of State Parks unanimously approved the Eastshore State Park general plan. The Eastshore State Park opened in 2006, almost forty years after the vision of a shoreline park was first articulated. The 8.5-mile (13.7 km) long park spans the Berkeley, Oakland, Emeryville, Albany and Richmond waterfronts, and preserves more than 2,000 acres (810 ha) of uplands and tidelands—also home to sixteen species of rare, threatened, or endangered wildlife.

In 2004, CESP changed its name from Citizens for the Eastshore State Park to Citizens for East Shore Parks in order to reflect its broader commitment to acquiring and preserving open space in the East Bay.

In 2006, CESP led a successful campaign to preserve the Albany shoreline from Magna Entertainment Corporation’s development efforts. The proposed shopping mall would have split the Eastshore State Park in two.

Leading up to it culmination in 2008, CESP joined with the local groups in Richmond to create a vision to protect the Richmond shoreline for open space, public access, habitat protection and recreation. CESP advocated for the direct acquisition of Breuner Marsh as part of the East Bay Regional Park system. As part of the North Richmond Shoreline Open Space Alliance, CESP urged the East bay Regional Park District to acquire the property. The East Bay Regional Park District (EBRPD) attempted to purchase the land from the landowner who instead announced intentions to build a development partly in the marsh, with the matter ending up in court finally and in 2008 the Court rule that the acquisition could go forward and put the price at $6.85 million. CESP and other environmental allies encouraged this acquisition to preserve and restore more than 200 acres (80 ha) of the North Richmond Shoreline.

CESP played a pivotal role in the successful creation of the Tom Bates Regional Sports Complex, opened in 2008. CESP brought its allies together to successfully fight for the creation of a regional sports complex at the shoreline as an adjunct to the Eastshore State Park. CESP (with allies Sierra Club, Golden Gate Audubon and others) persuaded the East Bay Regional Park District (EBRPD) of the advantages in buying a little-used 16-acre (6.5 ha) lot on the shoreline from Golden Gate Fields in the middle of the Eastshore State Park. CESP worked to set in motion a massive cooperative effort among the five cities along the Eastshore State Park and the EBRPD, along with the dedicated hard work of many ballfield user groups, to push the project forward and finally to see its opening for play in 2008. The complex was named after CESP Vice President and Mayor of Berkeley Tom Bates, in recognition of his decades of consistent work in helping to create the Eastshore State Park and for his stalwart leadership among the five cities and the EBRPD in bringing this complex to completion.

== Current projects ==
CESP is currently focusing its efforts on two geographic areas: Eastshore State Park and Richmond.

=== Eastshore State Park ===
CESP continues to support the development and operation of the Eastshore State Park, including habitat restoration and the creation of public amenities. One current project is construction of the long-overdue visitor’s center and park entrance at the proposed Brickyard site in Berkeley. Although a few issues (such as design and cost) remain unresolved, CESP has been working in conjunction with local and state park agencies to provide valued public input for the ongoing planning process.

CESP is involved with various habitat restoration projects. The Eastshore State Park General Plan mentions enhancing and restoring a number of ecosystems and habitat types throughout the park. The Berkeley Meadow is currently undergoing a long-term restoration project that will restore seasonal wetlands and create coastal scrub and native grasslands. The City of Albany and East Bay Regional Park District are undertaking a similar project at the Albany Plateau. Both projects will benefit threatened wildlife, such as the northern harrier, white-tailed kite, and western burrowing owl.

CESP is also staying abreast of developments in the Albany Waterfront Visioning Process. The Albany City Council is considering future alternative land uses for what is now the Golden Gate Fields racetrack, which occupies much of the waterfront, in the event that the racetrack closes. CESP is working with local residents to adopt a plan that would environmentally restore the site and incorporate it into the Eastshore State Park, while also addressing the need for responsible development.

=== Richmond ===
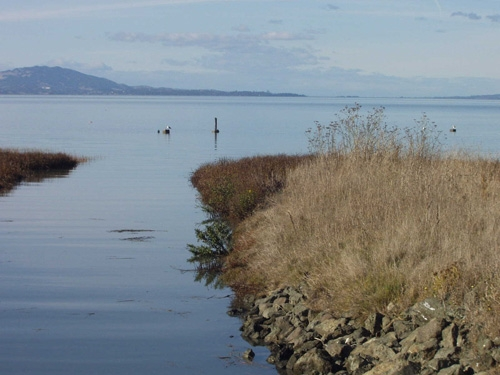
Breuner Marsh, in Richmond, recently acquired by East Bay Regional Park District.

The City of Richmond is currently updating its General Plan, which will determine land use options for the next 30 years. CESP is working to convince the City of Richmond to adopt a General Plan that secures and improves public access to Richmond’s 32 miles (51 km) of shoreline. CESP is also involved in a public outreach component designed to educate Richmond residents about the environmental, social, and economic benefits of public parks.

CESP’s vision for the Richmond shoreline consists of three parts. The first concerns the North Richmond Shoreline, which extends from Point Pinole to Wildcat Creek Marsh. Because of its rich ecological diversity and shoreline marshes, CESP calls for this part of the shoreline to be designated as parkland and open space, preventing any further development.

Another area of concern is Point San Pablo Peninsula, which includes Point Molate. The developer Upstream currently has plans to build a large-scale Indian casino and resort on this historic part of the shoreline, with far-reaching implications. The city of Richmond is considering a fast-track handover of the site to the developers for clean-up. CESP supports the creation of parkland along this shoreline rather than a casino complex.

On the South Richmond Shoreline, CESP is mainly concerned with the status of the Zeneca/Cherokee site and University of California's Richmond Field Station. Zeneca is one of the most toxic superfund sites in California. Beyond the immediate goal of achieving a comprehensive clean-up and restoration of the site, CESP opposes Cherokee-Simeon Ventures’ housing development plans for such a site and wants to incorporate the shoreline into the adjacent Eastshore State Park after appropriate clean-up.

== Publications ==
In 2007, Citizens for East Shore Parks published a brochure, Our Vision for the North Richmond Shoreline, to make the case for parks and open space in Richmond.

In 2008, CESP began publishing a periodic newsletter entitled Shore Lines, focusing on developments in the Eastshore State Park and Richmond.

In 2016, CESP published a brochure, Birds of the Albany Shoreline Albany Neck and Bulb Bird Survey, this brochure was a collaboration between CESP and Golden Gate Audubon Society. The brochure and survey was funded by the California State Parks Foundation.

== Partnerships ==
CESP has partnerships with more than a dozen local environmental organizations and foundations that share some of its basic objectives.

=== Supporting organizations ===
- Golden Gate Audubon Society
- Sierra Club
- Save The Bay
- NRSOSA (North Richmond Shoreline Open Space Alliance)
- Oakland Waterfront Coalition
- Berkeley Partners for Parks
- California Native Plant Society
- Environmental Defense
- Citizens Committee to Complete the Refuge
- Friends of Aquatics Park
- Oceanic Society
- Regional Parks Association
- Urban Creeks Council
- Contra Costa Hills Club
- California State Parks Foundation
- Citizens for the Albany Shoreline
- Ecology Center

=== Supporting foundations ===
- California State Parks Foundation
- Columbia Foundation
- Dean Witter Foundation
- East Bay Community Foundation
- Firedoll Foundation
- Gerbode Foundation
- Heller Fund
- Loveland Foundation
- Patagonia Tithing Fund
- Points of Light Foundation
- Recreational Equipment Inc.
- Richard and Rhoda Goldman Fund
- Rose Foundation
- San Francisco Foundation
- Strong Foundation
- True North Foundation
- Walter & Elise Haas Fund
- William and Flora Hewlett Foundation
