= McLaughlin Eastshore State Park =

State park and wildlife refuge

Coordinates: 37°52′5″N 122°18′30″W

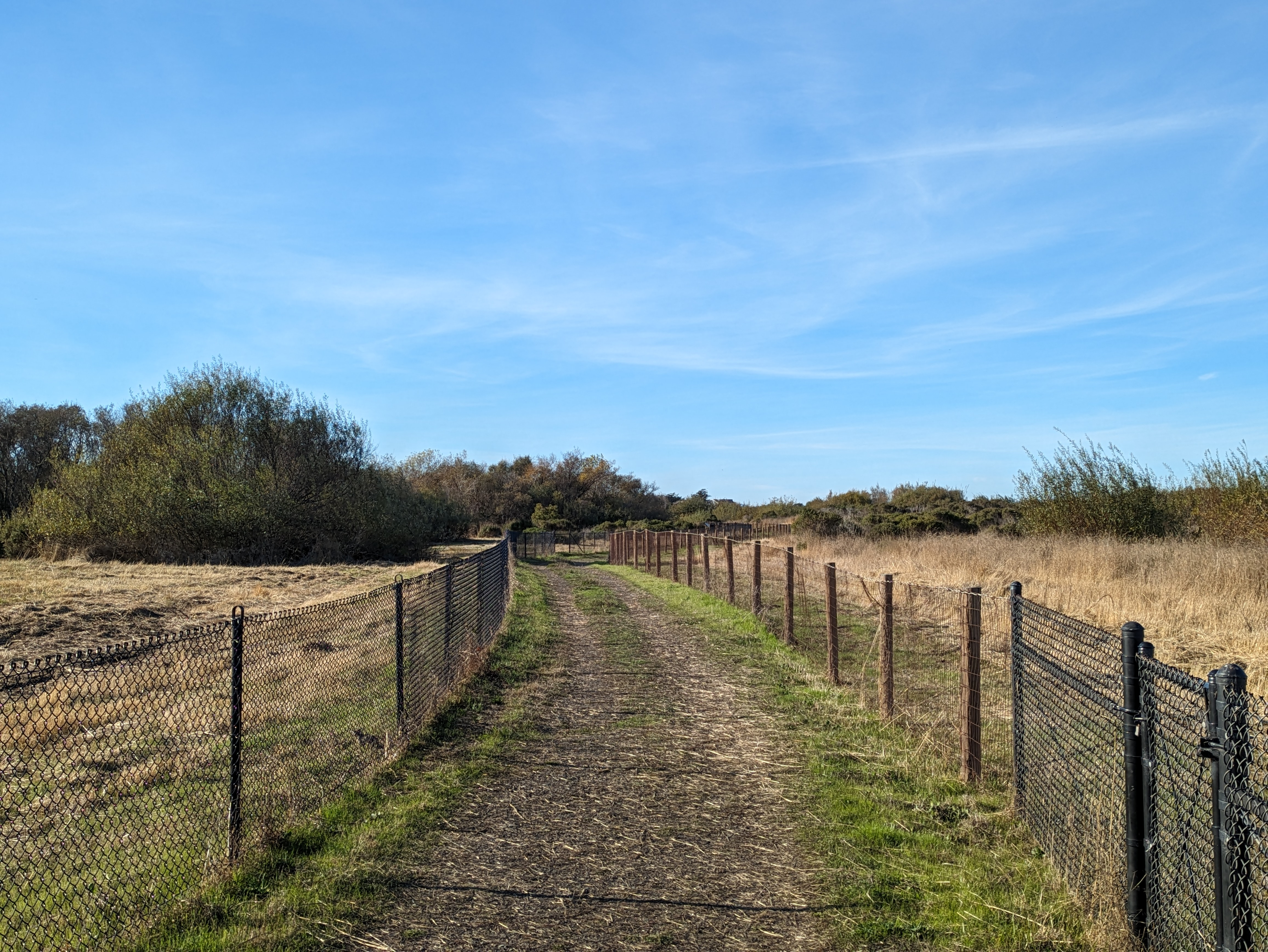
- McLaughlin Eastshore State Park, December 2023
- Interactive map of McLaughlin Eastshore State Park
- Location: San Francisco Bay Area (Alameda County, California)
- Area: 1,854 acres (750 ha)
- Operator: East Bay Regional Park District

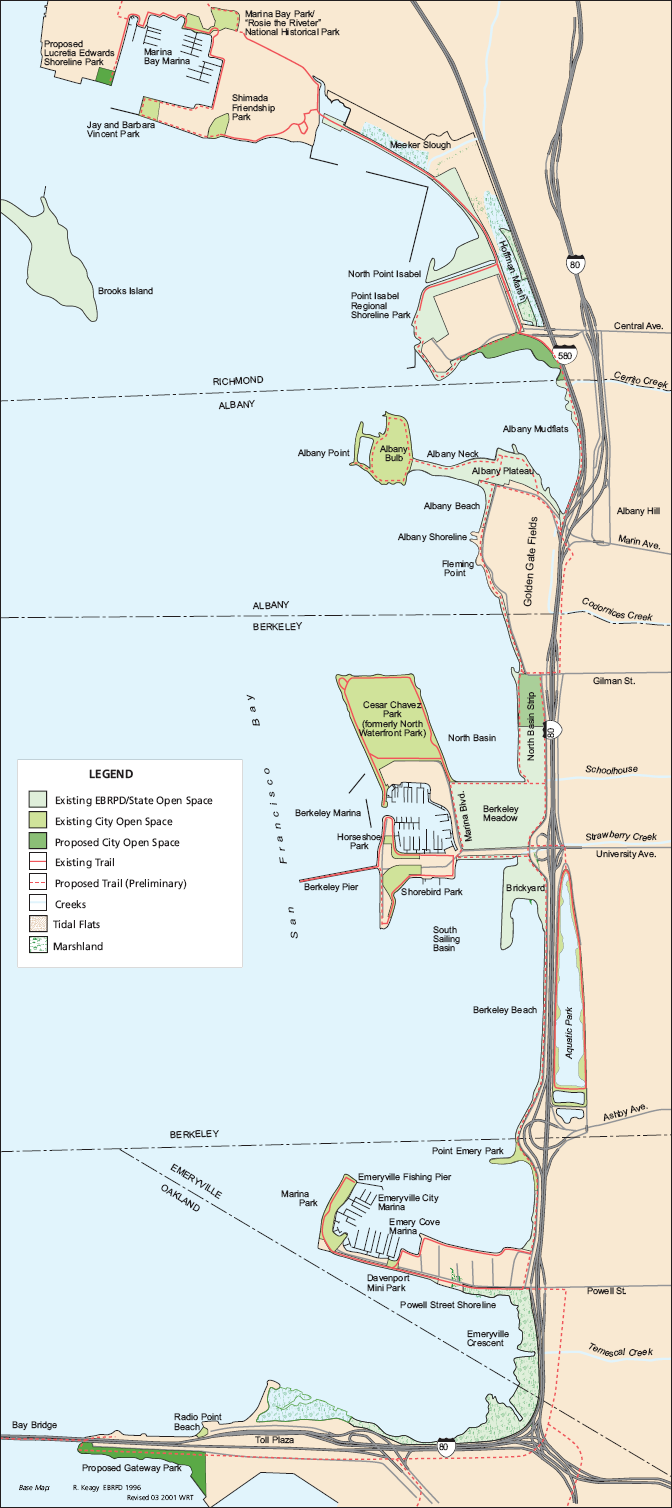
Map of Eastshore State Park

McLaughlin Eastshore State Park is a state park and wildlife refuge along the San Francisco Bay shoreline of the East Bay between the cities of Richmond, Albany, Berkeley, Emeryville, and Oakland. It encompasses remnant natural wetlands, restored wetlands, as well as landfill west of the Eastshore Freeway. The specific parts of the park are Point Isabel, Albany Beach and the bird preserve (not including Albany Bulb), the North Basin Strip, Berkeley Meadow, Brickyard Cove Staging Area, and the Emeryville Crescent. Its shoreline is 8.5 miles (13.7 km) long, and its total area is 1,854 acres (750 ha), which includes both tidelands and uplands. Originally named just Eastshore State Park, it was renamed in October 2012 to honor the late Save the Bay founder Sylvia McLaughlin, who, along with the late Dwight Steele of Citizens for Eastshore Park (now Citizens for East Shore Parks), drove the establishment of the park. Prior to 2013, it was jointly managed by the California State Parks and East Bay Regional Park District (EBRPD). The state agency and EBRPD executed a 30-year agreement for EBRPD to manage the park.

== History ==
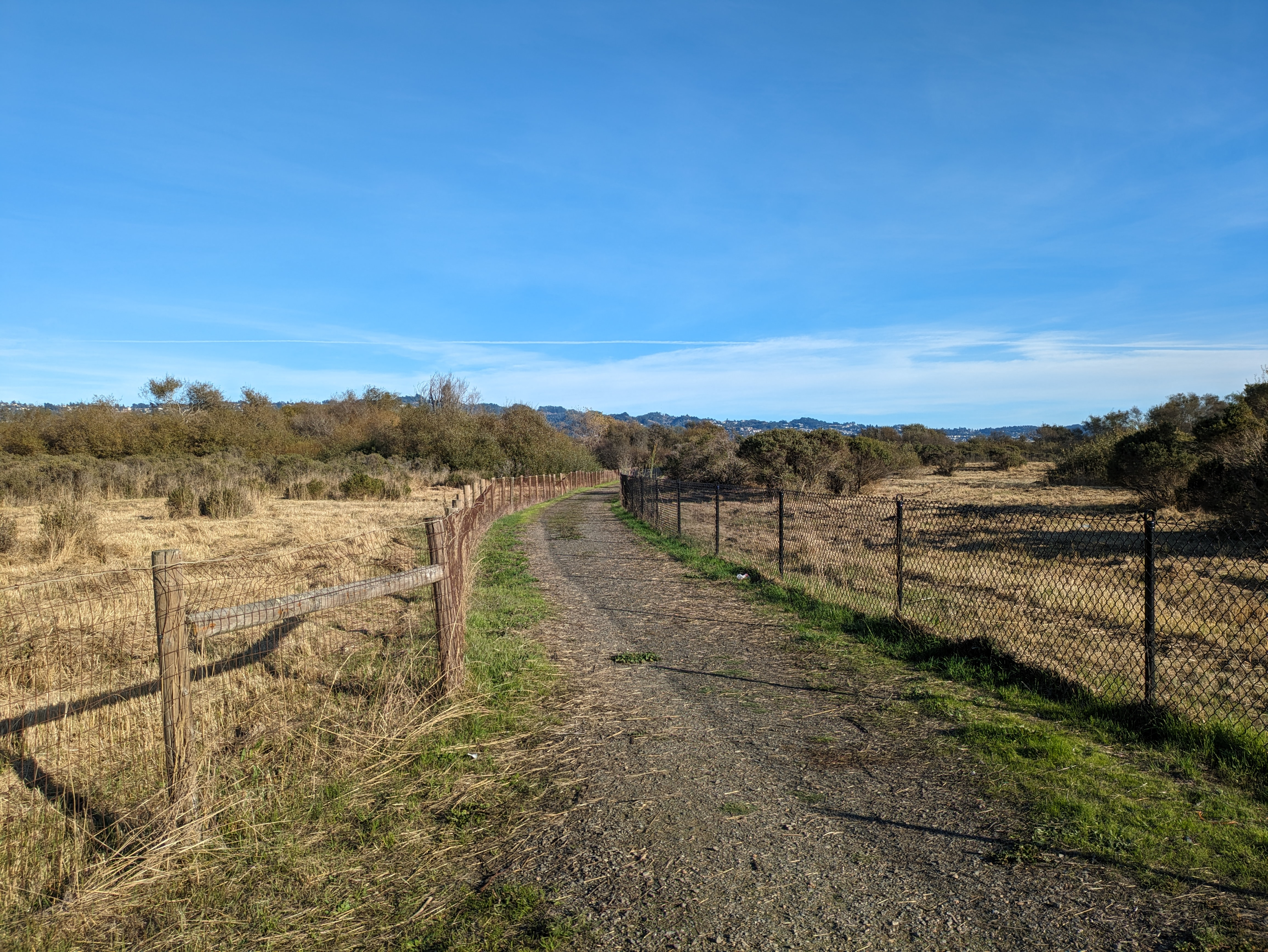
McLaughlin Eastshore State Park in 2023

During the 1960s, it became obvious that the East Shore of the San Francisco Bay was suffering from rapid commercial development and the accumulation of trash. In particular, a 72-acre (29 ha) tract north of the Bay Bridge that extended between the cities of Emeryville and Richmond attracted the attention of commercial developers and environmental activists alike, though for different reasons. The waterfront property, primarily owned by Catellus Development Corporation—a subsidiary of the Atchison, Topeka and Santa Fe Railway (Santa Fe for short)—was already worth many millions of dollars, and would be worth far more if developed with shopping centers and high-rise hotels.

Sylvia McLaughlin, a local housewife turned environmental activist, was alarmed enough by the situation to recruit friends and associates to form the non-profit Save San Francisco Bay Association, later renamed as Save the Bay. The newly formed association leaped into action, forming a shoreline park committee that began discussing how to raise funds for a small park in Berkeley in 1963. However, Save the Bay leaders soon realized that halting the dumping of material into the bay was a more urgent problem. In 1969 the state's Bay Conservation and Development Commission (BCDC) went from being an interim agency to a permanent state planning and regulatory entity. BCDC backed the idea that the state park system should buy the land. However California State Parks, which had little experience managing urban land and little interest in the complicated challenges of this particular polluted parcel, showed no interest in taking on the property. EBRPD, which was already operating eight urban shoreline parks, thought Cal Parks should be the lead agency. Furthermore, Santa Fe's owners felt certain that their property would become much more valuable if it remained in their hands.

Santa Fe had a temporary setback in 1972, when the Berkeley City Council voted against allowing a proposed regional shopping center to be built atop a landfill. Santa Fe sued the city but lost the case in 1980, when the Supreme Court of California rejected the planned construction. A second setback had already occurred when the BCDC rejected Santa Fe's plan to build several high-rise buildings over wetlands in Emeryville. The Emeryville project became known by local people as "stilt city". Soon after the Supreme Court ruling, the California State Park and Recreation Commission put the shoreline park on its list of priority projects to fund and issued an official East Bay Shoreline Report recommending establishment of an East Bay shoreline park and identified key lands for inclusion. Further progress on the park stopped when Republican George Deukmejian was elected Governor in 1983.

Santa Fe continued its strategy of promoting large-scale development projects along the shorelines of Emeryville, Berkeley, and Albany. Its real estate subsidiary, Catellus Development Company, lost more court battles in the three cities before giving up in 1990. In 1998, with the state's finances recovering, voters approved two bond issues, one state and one regional, raising $40 million for purchasing land for the new Eastshore park. Also, a 1998 act in the California State Legislature authorized EBRPD to act for the state and use state funds to buy land for and operate the new Eastshore park.

EBRPD had bought properties known as the Emeryville Crescent, Albany Mudflats, and part of Hoffman Marsh by 1992. By 1998 it had also purchased the Berkeley Meadow, Brickyard Cove, and the North Basin Strip (together considered of greater value than the narrow shoreline parcels). Catellus wanted $80 million for the former Santa Fe tract, but ultimately settled for $27.5 million after EBRPD threatened to employ eminent domain to acquire the property.

In addition to the complicated process of buying parcels of land and landfill that would become the future state park, how areas were to be used was and remains controversial. The City of Berkeley was to have contributed its former landfill to become one of the larger areas of "upland" (dry land) for the park but held it back, apparently out of concerns that recreation would be overly restricted. (That 90 acres or so of capped landfill is now Cesar Chavez Park.) Albany's former landfill, the Albany Bulb, was hotly disputed—on one end of the spectrum, some wanted it to be entirely a conservation area that did not allow people; on the other, park users wanted continued access and recreation—and set aside to be transferred at some later point into the state park. (As of 2020, that has not happened.) North Point Isabel, a toxic landfill that was remediated and capped in the mid-1980s, had been popular for recreation, including off-leash dog walking. Sierra Club, Citizens for East Shore Parks, Golden Gate Audubon Society and others worked to restrict recreation on that spit of land and require dogs to be on-leash-only. In response to tremendous public support, state park planners authorized the continued use of North Point Isabel for off-leash recreation. Sierra Club opposed that.

=== Funded improvement projects (2016) ===
In March 2016, EBRPD announced that it would spend $2 million to extend the San Francisco Bay Trail, remove debris, toxic soil and invasive plants from two sections of the park, and remove the 53 foot (16 m) high dirt pile that has been considered an eyesore for more than ten years. The height of the pile will be lowered 15 feet (4.6 m) by grading, using the dirt to create small hills that would act as a buffer between the park and the adjacent freeway. The hills are to be seeded with native grasses, adding or improving habitat for shorebirds and other wildlife. A second contract will simultaneously complete the previously approved restoration of Albany Beach, which includes "... beach and dune enhancements, a non-motorized boat launch, restroom, parking and about a mile of the Bay Trail west of Golden Gate Fields."

== Ecology and natural environment ==
=== Climate ===
McLaughlin Eastshore State Park is situated within the greater Easy Bay warm-summer-Mediterranean climate, or classification “csb,” under the Koppen-Geiger climate zone classification from the period 1991-2020.This type of mediterranean climate exhibits temperate winters and summers. Winters are characterized by rainy weather, while summer is characterized by warm, but not extremely hot temperatures.

=== Marshland ===
The park stretch consists of tidal marshes, sub tidal areas, and mudflats. These habitats' existence are made possible by fill placement which has harmed the species (native and invasive) that inhabit the land through the ecological destruction of the natural wetlands of the area. The point where the freshwater of streams met the saltwater of the San Francisco Bay was nutrient rich and created a habitat for many organisms. The marshes have been home to crustaceans such as shrimp, clams, and oysters that are important food sources for shorebirds and waterfowl. As birds migrated, bay shorelines would be a pivotal stop. However, human alteration of the shore has fragmented or completely destroyed some of these marshlands. A majority of the species highly impacted by human intervention are the native species near the park. The goal of the park is to conserve the natural resources while providing a place for humans to enjoy recreational activities.

=== Flora and fauna ===
A few of the native species prominent to the park are the common coyote brush (Baccharis pilularis), California sagebrush (Artemisia californica), local salt grass (Distichlis spicata), California sea lavender (Limonium californicum), and Pacific cordgrass (Spartina foliosa). A few of the invasive/nonnative species of the park include Chasmanthe (floribunda Chasmanthe), Bullthistle (Cirsium vulgare), Cape ivy (Delairea odorata), and Wild teasel (Dipsacus fullonum). The goal of the park is to conserve the natural resources while providing a place for humans to enjoy recreational activities.

In a study examining urbanization’s impact on the bird communities in San Francisco's East Bay ecosystem, the Eastshore State Park (out of 3 areas surveyed) had the most diverse bird population. The park has both inland and seabirds with a total of 46 species identified across survey locations. During the study period (June to August) the species with notable abundance were the American White Pelican (Pelecanus erythrorhynchos), American Coot (Fulica americana), American Crow (Corus brachyrhynchos), House Finch (Haemouhous mexicanus), and Rock Pigeon (Columba livia). Despite its relative naturalness, the bird community composition and species abundance can fluctuate seasonally and are influenced by factors like habitat complexity and human activity.

=== Shoreline management ===
Parts of the state park are included as part of the East Bay Operational Landscape Unit (OLU) by the San Francisco Estuary Institute (SFEI). The SFEI categorizes the shoreline of the bay as OLUs based on groupings of physical characteristics, including both natural and man-made aspects. The areas included McLaughlin Eastshore State Park are mostly either mudflats or marshland. In a summary analysis of the East Bay shoreline’s ability to resist erosion, the SFEI identified some parts of the state park as notable areas where shoreline management would be important for curtailing erosion.

==== Albany Beach ====
The Albany Mudflats that are a part of the Albany Beach are important for curtailing marsh erosion and used by shorebirds to look for food. The SFEI recommended projects for implementing eelgrass and reefs in this part of the shoreline in order to conserve and contribute to the mudflats.

==== Berkeley Meadow ====
Berkeley Meadow was noted by the SFEI as a fragmented marshland. The space provides potential for greater “habitat connectivity” through filling in the marsh fragments, since marshland is a significant site for shorebird migration.

==== Emeryville Crescent ====
The mudflats and tidal marshes of Emeryville Crescent are valuable for the preservation of infrastructure. Noted as a “living shoreline” because of reefs and eelgrass, the Emeryville Crescent decreases the severity of shoreline erosion. Located near the I-80 freeway, the SFEI identified the crescent as an area where conserving and manually adding shoreline could be important for overall shoreline retainment. Emeryville Crescent was also identified as a “horizontal levee opportunity” location because of its value in stopping floodwater erosion.

== Adjacent parks ==
- Aquatic Park
- César Chávez Park
- Point Isabel Regional Shoreline
- Albany Bulb

== See also ==
- San Francisco Bay Trail
- Citizens for East Shore Parks (CESP)
