= Fleming Point =

Rocky promontory in California, U.S.

Coordinates: 37.8858°N 122.3144°W

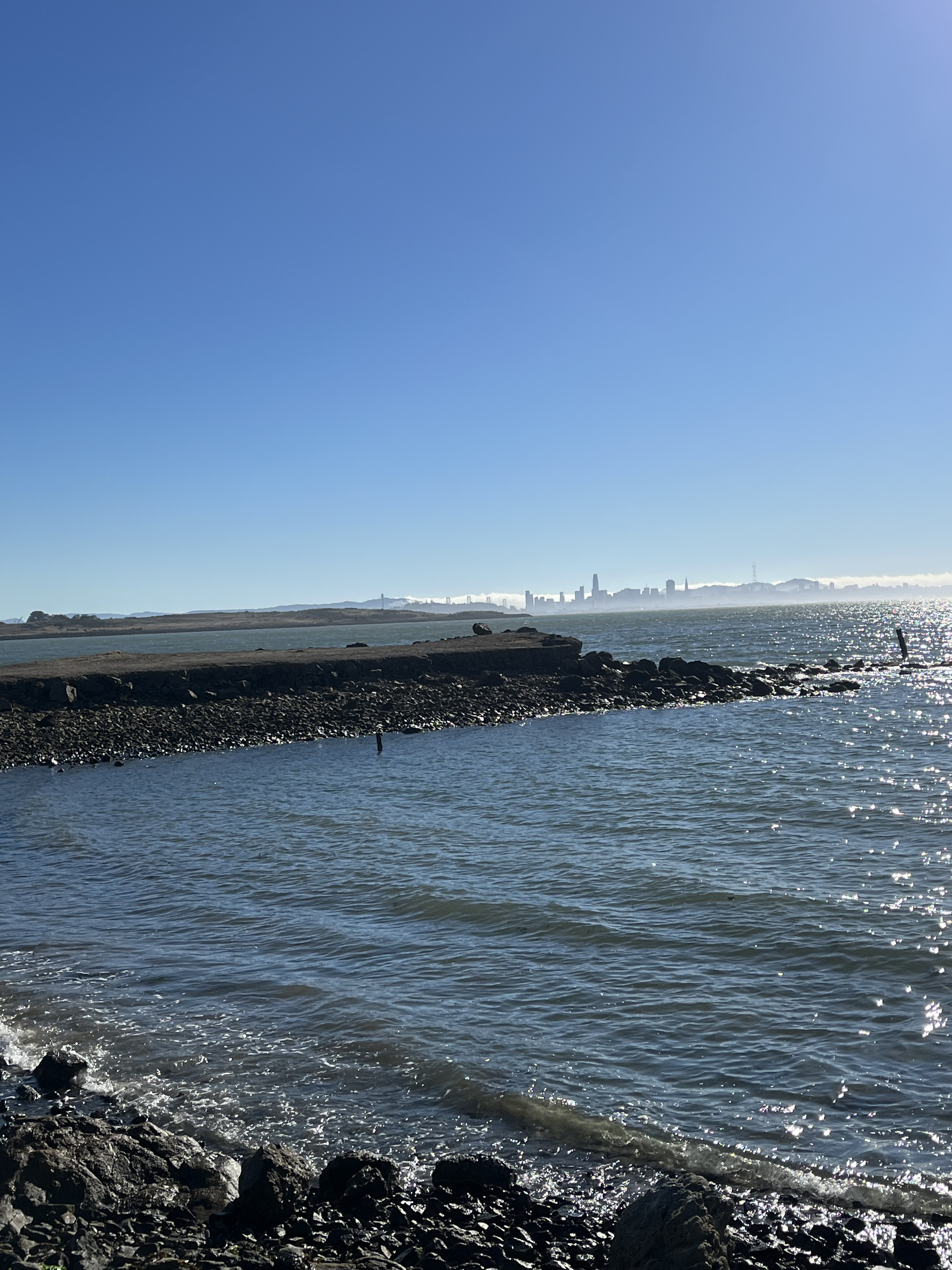
The landscape of Fleming Point, California.

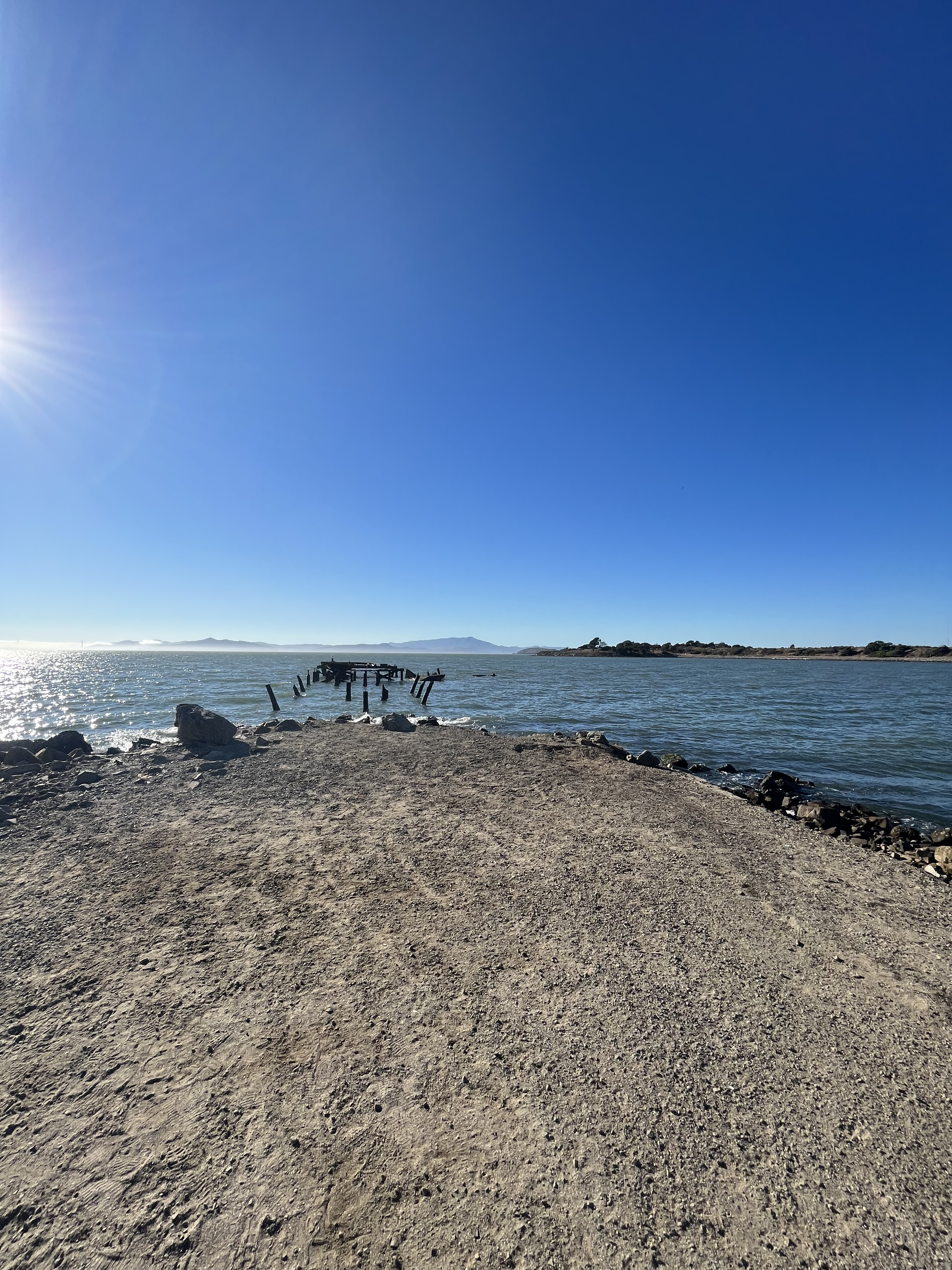
An old broken-down pier is visible in the center.

Fleming Point is a rocky promontory in the U.S. state of California. The rocky promontory is part of a band of rock, that geologists call the Novato Terrane. Which has been formed through titanic clashes of plates that have pulled the rock upwards. This area is the only original existing shoreline in the East Bay Region today. It is situated in Albany, on the eastern shore of San Francisco Bay. Albany Bulb is an extension of the point, having been formed in the 1960s from construction debris.

== History ==
Fleming Point is named after John T. Fleming who lived in the area in 1853, having bought the land from Jose Domingo Peralta. However, prior to foreign settlement, this area was occupied by the Native American tribe, Ohlone, who harvested and hunted shellfish. In the 19th century, it was the site of the Giant Powder Company and Judson Dynamite and Powder Company. The Giant plant suffered two major accidental explosions, one in 1880 and another in 1892. Explosives plants dominated the Albany waterfront until 1905 when they were replaced with somewhat less dangerous chemical factories. By the first decade of the 20th century, it was used by residents of Berkeley as a garbage dump, one of the reasons the City of Albany decided to incorporate in 1908. At the end of the point, there seems to be evidence of what once was a small pier. It is currently the site of Golden Gate Fields, which held its first meeting on February 1, 1941. Also during the late 1930s, it was used as a horse track and did not reopen until 1947. It is now one of the last remaining components of the Bay's original shoreline.

== Geology ==
Near Fleming Point, south of Point Richmond, the waters of the bay have cut low cliffs in which even alternations of sandstone and shale are observable. In some instances, the black shale shows a decided lenticular character. Some lenses are fifteen to twenty feet long and a foot or so thick in the central part. The shores of the water here are a pivotal area of algae production.

== Animal life ==
Some animals that can be found here are crabs and mussels. The Albany mudflats located near Fleming Point consist of a narrow band of salt, marsh, pickle-weed, and cordgrass vegetation that feeds shorebirds, ducks, geese, and other large aquatic birds. Some common birds that are found within the Albany Waterfront are Western Sandpipers, American Wigeons, and Foresters tern. These birds can be seen flying over Fleming Point when the sun is out and appear during warmer times of the year.
