= Oceanic Society =

US-based non-profit organization

- Oceanic Society logo
- Founded: 1969
- Founder: George C. Kiskaddon and Dr. Jerold M. Lowenstein
- Type: Non-profit organization
- Tax ID no.: 94-3105570
- Purpose: Marine conservation, Environmental protection, Endangered species, Environmental education, Eco-tourism, Volunteering, Marine research, Marine protected area, Marine mammals, Sea turtles
- Location: 30 Sir Francis Drake Blvd., Ross, CA 94957, United States
- Website: oceanicsociety.org

Oceanic Society is a California-based 501(c)(3) non-profit organization dedicated to conserving marine wildlife and habitats by deepening the connections between people and nature. The organization was founded in San Francisco in 1969 by George C. Kiskaddon, founder of Marine Chartering Company, and Dr. Jerold M. Lowenstein, director of the Pacific Institute of Nuclear Medicine.

== Early history ==
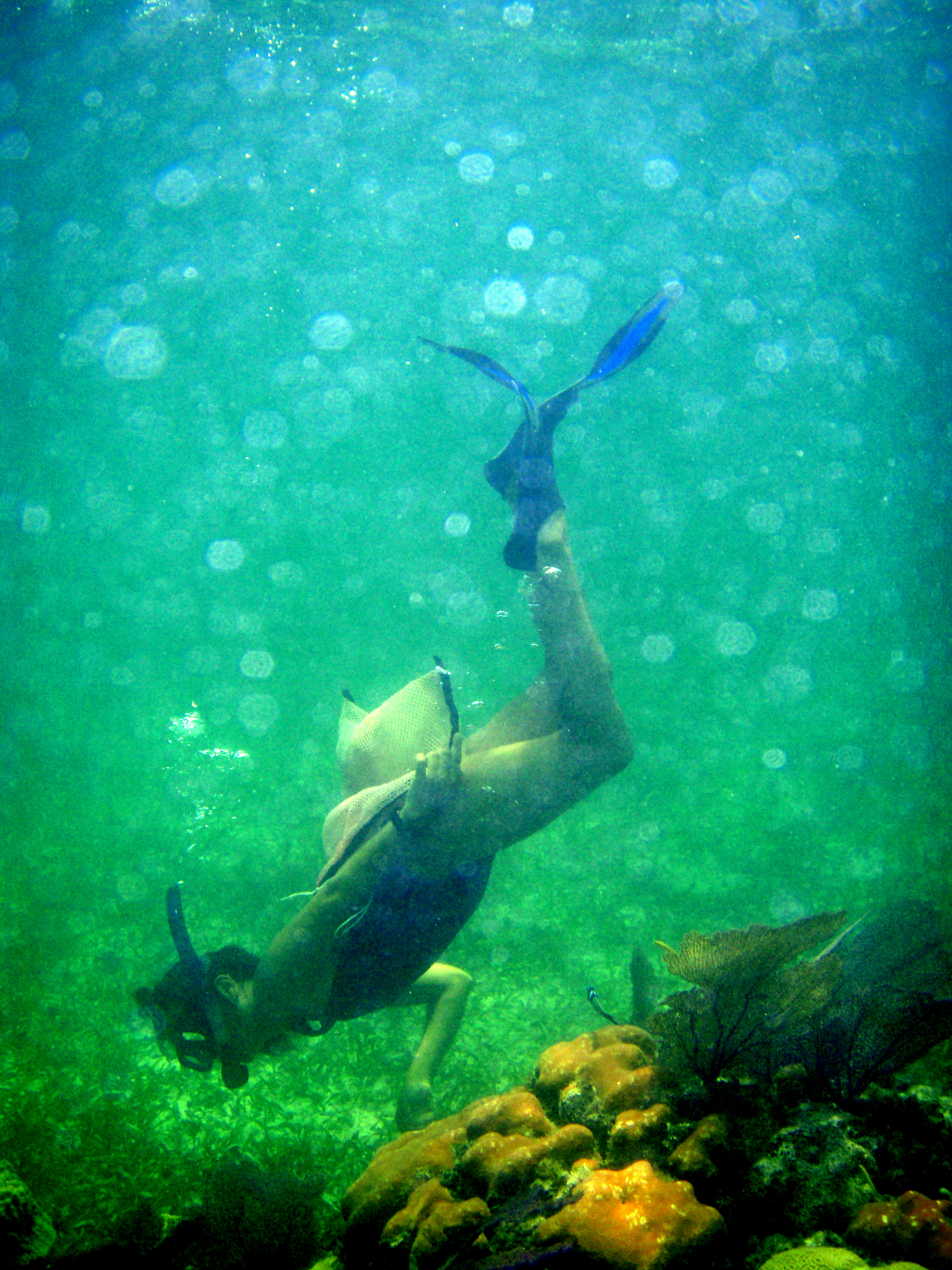
Guide Kathy Cure from Oceanic Society Research Station in Blackbird Caye, Belize in 2008

After its foundation in 1969, Oceanic Society grew rapidly in the San Francisco Bay Area through membership drives, citizen science programs involving Bay Area yacht owners, and an Expeditions program. The organization's initial focus was on environmental issues in the Pacific Ocean, but the Bay Area chapter simultaneously sought to create a model that would be re-created by chapters worldwide.

In 1974, Christopher du Pont Roosevelt, grandson of Franklin Delano Roosevelt, took on the leadership of Oceanic Society and served as the organization's president, CEO, and trustee until 1985. Under Roosevelt's leadership the organization moved its headquarters to Stamford, Connecticut and expanded nationally to more than 60,000 members in 5 chapters.

=== Oceanic Society Patrol ===
One of Oceanic Society's most important programs in its early years was the Oceanic Society Patrol, which was established in 1972 as a way to engage Bay Area yacht owners and pilots as volunteer participants in research and monitoring for ocean conservation. The Boat Patrol enlisted and trained private boat owners to monitor water quality, collect oceanographic data, monitor marine mammals and other species, transport biologists to the Farallon Islands (through the Farallon Patrol), document pollution events, and perform other tasks as volunteers at their own expense. Similarly, the Air Patrol of light plane flyers monitored enforcement of environmental regulations and pollution events, industry and shipping activity, and collected data on marine mammals. The Patrols also participated in education and outreach through lectures and by inviting volunteer participants aboard their craft.

=== Oceanic Society Expeditions ===
The Oceanic Society Expeditions program was formally established in 1972 to support the organization's efforts to ″create a more oceanic society.″ The Expeditions program allowed Oceanic Society's members to participate in ship-based expeditions around the world, sometimes accomplishing specific research objectives. Early Expeditions included New Zealand, Australia, Europe, the Caribbean, South and Central America, and the California coast. As Oceanic Society's membership grew, so did the demand for Expeditions, and the program was expanded to include many more destinations and departures.

The Oceanic Society Expeditions program continues to this day, and includes eco-tourism programs and volunteer vacations to global destinations that include the Galapagos Islands, Palau, Raja Ampat, Belize, Kenya, the Polar Regions, and more.

=== California whale watching ===
Public interest in whale watching grew dramatically in the early 1970s as the ″Save the Whales″ movement brought global attention to the plight of these animals. Oceanic Society ran its first whale watching trip to the Farallon Islands in 1975 aboard a former Coast Guard Cutter, M/V Alert, and soon began to offer regular whale watching trips out of Sausalito, Pillar Point, and Bodega Bay, California, and eventually to Baja California out of San Diego. Oceanic Society continues to offer whale watching in the San Francisco Bay Area, with two separate whale watching seasons: 1) Gray whale watching from January through May, and 2) Farallon Islands whale watching from May through November.

=== Oceans magazine ===
From 1974 to 1989, Oceanic Society published the popular and widely distributed Oceans magazine, that featured articles, images, and maps pertaining to ocean research, exploration, and conservation issues, as well as updates about the work of Oceanic Society's chapters.

Oceans magazine was founded by Jack C. Reynolds and originally published by Trident Publishers, Inc. of San Diego, California, in January 1969. In the editorial of Oceans magazine Volume 1, Number 1, publisher Jack Reynolds wrote, ″To effect a better world, it is our responsibility to educate ourselves in all facets of living, to be creative in philosophy, exploring, enterprise and leisure. On these premises, I launch Oceans Magazine.″ Oceanic Society took over the publication in 1974, publishing at first five, then six issues a year until April 1989 when publication ceased after the release of Volume 22, Number 1.

== Current work ==
=== Turneffe Atoll, Belize ===
Oceanic Society maintained a field research station at Blackbird Caye in Turneffe Atoll, Belize, from 2001 to 2016. The station served as a base for marine research, principally on bottlenose dolphins, Antillean manatees, sea turtles, American crocodiles, and other species, as well as long-term coral reef monitoring.

=== Ulithi Atoll, Micronesia ===
Since 2004, Oceanic Society has been assisting community-based marine conservation efforts in Ulithi Atoll in the Federated States of Micronesia. Oceanic Society's involvement in Ulithi began through support to a local sea turtle research and conservation program, and subsequently expanded to include a broader effort to sustainably manage Ulithi's marine resources.
