= Golden Gate Bird Alliance =

Nonprofit organization in California, US

- Formation: 1917; 109 years ago
- Type: Nonprofit organization
- Headquarters: Berkeley, California
- Region served: San Francisco and the East Bay
- Executive Director: Glenn Phillips
- Main organ: Board of Directors
- Website: goldengatebirdalliance.org

Golden Gate Bird Alliance is an American 501(c)(3) non-profit environmental organization engaged in bird conservation and environmental awareness. Headquartered in the David Brower Center in Berkeley, California, Golden Gate Bird Alliance was formed in 1917 and incorporated into the National Audubon Society in 1948. With 3,586 members and supporters, Golden Gate Bird Alliance spans Northern California, with a particular focus on San Francisco County, West Alameda County, and West Contra Costa County.

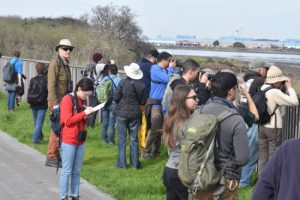
Golden Gate Bird Alliance bird walk at the Albany Bulb, on January 26, 2019

== History ==
=== Grassroots Origins ===
Golden Gate Bird Alliance started out as a group of birdwatchers from U.C. Berkeley who had taken Harold Bryant's nature study class in 1917. Led by founding president Carlos Lastreto, these students formed the Audubon Association of the Pacific with the aim to study, enjoy, and protect birds. The name was chosen in honor of John James Audubon, an ornithologist who painted and cataloged bird species in his book The Birds of America.

The early activities of the Golden Gate Bird Alliance included monthly field trips and speakers on topics in ornithology and natural history. These programs have continued and developed alongside the organization. Encouraging citizen science, they supported bird censuses in Golden Gate Park by numerous parties including the California Academy of Sciences and the Boy Scouts.

=== Early Conservation Efforts ===
The newly formed Audubon Association of the Pacific encountered their first conservation issue in 1919. Due to an increase in automobile ownership, the flourishing oil shipment industry tankers were dumping contaminated ballast water off the coast near the Farallon Islands, a breeding ground for both seabirds and mammals along the Pacific Coast. In 1919, Carlos Lastreto and a colleague from the California Academy of Sciences met with officials from Standard Oil, Union Oil, and Associated Oil to discuss cessation of this pollution, and convinced them to begin recycling the waste oil at onshore facilities instead. This was among the first efforts by Golden Gate Bird Alliance to combat oil spills in the Bay Area.

From as early as 1918, the Audubon Association of the Pacific opposed the draining of the Klamath lakes for irrigation and land clearing purposes. Instead, they proposed that the land be given to the government for protection and conservation. This region would eventually become the Klamath Basin National Wildlife Refuge Complex.

Beginning in 1928, the Audubon Association of the joined with Southern California Audubon members in a campaign to choose a state bird. Founding president Carlos Lastreto hosted a weekly 15-minute radio show about birds on KGO radio, while other members recruited schools, garden clubs, and chambers of commerce to join the contest. in 1931, the victor was the California quail with 61,559 votes, beating the western bluebird with 18,966, Bullock's oriole with 11,876, and Anna's hummingbird with 10,968.

Following a collision between the liner President Coolidge and the oil tanker Frank H. Buck off of Point Bonita in 1937, volunteers from the Association documented 188 dead sea birds between Cliff House and Mussel Rock.

=== Joining National Audubon ===
In the wake of World War II Golden Gate Bird Alliance grew significantly. In 1948, they joined National Audubon Society and a year later the Audubon Association of the Pacific became the Golden Gate Audubon Society.

=== 1950s – 1960s ===
Golden Gate Bird Alliance raised money to help build the Rotary Nature Center at Lake Merritt in 1952.

In 1956, Golden Gate Bird Alliance worked with other local Audubon chapters as well as the Sierra Club to create a new salt marsh sanctuary spanning 1,000 acres (400 ha). This would later on become a part of the Don Edwards S.F. National Wildlife Refuge.

=== 1970s ===
Golden Gate Bird Alliance joined the Sierra Club and Save the Bay Association in sponsoring the Point Pinole Committee for the purpose of supporting the acquisition of Point Pinole as a public parkland. Purchased from Bethlehem Steel in 1971, with a $100,000 contribution from Golden Gate Bird Alliance, Point Pinole was designated for preservation and open space.

In 1971, two Standard Oil tankers collided, spilling over 800,000 gallons of oil into the San Francisco Bay. Golden Gate Bird Alliance joined the clean-up efforts alongside other volunteers and workers, as well as convened a meeting between Standard Oil and other Bay Area Audubon chapters. This disaster resulted in the inception of the International Bird Rescue, an organization that has led rescue efforts in the wake of hundreds of oil spills worldwide.

The unauthorized filling of the bay for the Emeryville Harbor was met with resistance from Golden Gate Bird Alliance. They proposed that, as mitigation, acreage in the Emeryville Crescent be dedicated to bird habitat. By the end of 1975, the City of Emeryville designated most of the Crescent as open space. Following this, in 1978, when the Emeryville Crescent's tidal marshes were threatened, Golden Gate Bird Alliance stepped forward and saved the marsh from destruction.

Water from Mono Lake's tributaries was diverted by the Los Angeles Department of Water and Power to provide for the expanding Los Angeles in 1941. Over the next several decades, Mono Lake's water levels severely dropped and salinity drastically increased. The resulting degradation of the natural habitat had dire consequences for Mono Lake's ecology, and in 1978, the dispute entered the courtroom. Golden Gate Bird Alliance was the first to back the lawsuit, and former Vice President George Peyton called on National Audubon and other chapters to support the Mono Lake Committee in its legal battle to protect the lake. With Peyton coordinating the series of lawsuits, Golden Gate Bird Alliance members raised over $100,000 for legal expenses through Birdathons, raffles, and other events. The conclusion of the legal battle was a historical victory for conservationists. In 1983, it was decided that the state was obligated to protect areas such as Mono Lake, and Los Angeles was given resources to meet their water needs in an environmentally conscious way. By 1994, the state implemented a plan to stabilize Mono Lake's water level and restore the wetlands and waterways feeding the lake.

=== 1980s ===
Concerned that development plans would destroy habitats for federally endangered red-legged frogs and Alameda whipsnakes, Golden Gate Bird Alliance, alongside Save Open Space – Gateway Valley, worked against the 1987 proposed project in Gateway Valley, Alameda. Forcing the developers, Pacific New Wave, to give up, the project was given to a new developer in 1996, Orinda Gateway LLC. A settlement between the concerned parties in 2006 resulted in an 80% reduction in the development, preserving approximately 1,000 acres as part of the East Bay Regional Parks District.

Golden Gate Bird Alliance played an important and active role in assuring that the California Parks and Wildlife initiative had enough signatures to have a place on the ballot in 1987. More than 300 hours of volunteer time was logged by Golden Gate Bird Alliance members gathering signatures. A contribution of $1,500 was made to ensure that the North Bay Wetlands were specifically included in the land acquisition plans.

Golden Gate Bird Alliance, alongside other organizations, funded research and testimony for the 1987 California State Water Resources Control Board's (SWRCB) Bay/Delta Hearings; hearings that would determine the fate of the bay and how much water would be diverted from it. In 1991, Golden Gate Bird Alliance sued the SWRCB for their decision to ignore the freshwater flows issue, threatening marshes of Suisun Bay and all associated wildlife. In December 1994, the results were announced; joint state-federal Principles for Agreement would protect the Bay/Delta's natural resources, providing reliable water flows to farms and cities that relied on Delta diversions.

In 1989 the City of Alameda approved a new ferry terminal and route through the eelgrass. Golden Gate Bird Alliance sued the city over a refusal to produce an Environmental Impact Report (EIR) on the potential impacts of the ferry on the eelgrass and endangered Least Tern. Prior to the trial, the city capitulated, withdrawing the project pending further study.

=== 1990s ===
An ongoing project in the 1990s, Golden Gate Bird Alliance's Dan Murphy took initiative to protect the bank swallow colony at Fort Funston. Efforts ranged from preventing people from setting off fireworks right under the colony on the 4th of July, to fencing off that part of San Francisco's Ocean Beach located right under the colony. In 2000, Golden Gate Bird Alliance intervened with a lawsuit addressing an ongoing issue: dog walking. A continuous point of contention between dog owners and conservationists in San Francisco, the Golden Gate National Recreation Area released its proposed rules in 2016. These rules, conceding to both sides, were set to be finalized in 2017, after 14 years of debates.

In 1991, a Golden Gate Bird Alliance Conservation Committee member attended a press conference regarding the proposal to turn 3,000 cubic yards of earth at the north entrance of Wildcat Canyon Regional Park into a parking space for horse trailers. During the East Bay Regional Park District's Board of Director's meeting, the Golden Gate Bird Alliance representative recounted their personal birding experiences and emphasized the importance of the area with regards to ecological preservation. Alongside other key testimonies, the proposal was discarded, and the woodland hillside remained intact.

As a response to a Golden Gate Bird Alliance Action Alert mailed to a select list of activist members in 1992, over 100 letters were delivered to the S.F. Bay Conservation and Development Commission opposing the widening of Interstate 80 next to the Emeryville Crescent. As a direct result of the letters, the Commission ordered the California Department of Transportation to: 1) put no fill in the Bay between Ashby Split and Emeryville, 2) reduce the proposed shoulder width next to the Crescent so as to preserve as much upland habitat as possible (and to remove all ice plants and replace it with native vegetation), 3) create 4,500 square feet of new adjacent upland habitat, and 4) use sound water quality measures in order to reduce the amount of polluted runoff entering the marsh from the Interstate 80.

In 1992, Golden Gate Bird Alliance provided $25,000 to buy the Marin Islands in San Pablo Bay, now part of the S.F. National Wildlife Refuge. These islands are critically important egret and heron breeding grounds and rookeries.

In 1995, Golden Gate Bird Alliance, alongside 11 other environmental organizations, challenged California Governor Wilson's attempt to significantly weaken the California Endangered Species Act. His proposals would have empowered landowners regarding decisions about habitat interference regardless of endangered species or plants. Species left unprotected by the National Endangered Species Act, which were only protected in California, would have their protection reassessed under much more stringent conditions. The challenge resulted in a success for conservationists, preserving the integrity of the California Endangered Species Act.

In 1996, Golden Gate Bird Alliance pushed for the creation of Crissy Field Marsh in San Francisco's Presidio, previously a military fortification which had been decommissioned and transferred to the National Park Service in 1994. Originally the site of a vast wetland that extended almost to Fort Mason, Golden Gate Bird Alliance sought to restore some of this marshland. Nowadays this marshland teems with ducks, herons, and other wildlife.

In 1999, Golden Gate Bird Alliance sought to create enough habitat in city parks to reestablish California quail populations. Gathering hundreds of volunteers, over 4,500 native plants were hand planted in Presidio.

=== 2000s ===
In August 2001, Golden Gate Bird Alliance and Alameda County won a significant court victory in defending Measure D, the ambitious anti-sprawl measure designed to preserve open space in eastern Alameda County. Measure D had been drafted by the Sierra Club and was passed in November 2000, thanks in no small part to Golden Gate Bird Alliance's support. In 2001, two sets of developers had filed suits challenging the legality of Measure D on a variety of grounds. These challenges were discarded by Superior Court Judge James Richman, leading to a victory for Golden Gate Bird Alliance and others.

Following an accidental oil spill in the Clinton Basin while trying to remove an abandoned boat from the Oakland Estuary in 2000, Golden Gate Bird Alliance notified the Regional Water Quality Control Board to ask they impose sufficient fines upon the Port of Oakland so as to allow for restoration. Working with the Port of Oakland, the Regional Water Quality Control Board, and the Baykeeper, Golden Gate Bird Alliance undertook a restoration effort to improve the Clinton Basin over the next few years.

Golden Gate Bird Alliance played a significant role in the conception, drafting, and passing of three separate bills in 2000. The first bill would require the San Francisco Bay Conservation and Development Commission to give equal weight to wildlife as to public access when approving a permit, a major step forward in protecting the bay wildlife and habitats. The second would have the California Department of Fish and Game keep track of Wetland Mitigation Banks. These banks are a tool to mitigate (compensate for) the destruction of wetlands, and were a concern for environmentalists fearing this may be used to make it easier to get development permits that would harm the wetlands. The third bill would have the State Resources Agency undertake an inventory of all the wetlands in California and identify restoration, enhancement, and acquisition objectives for the state to improve the quality and quantity of the state's wetlands.

Following the California State Water Resources Control Board's (SWRCB) issued Water Quality Standards for the Bay-Delta in 1995, in December 1999, the SWRCB issued Decision 1641 which was a document supposed to implement the Water Quality Standards by informing the involved water-rights holders how much water they could receive each year. Theoretically, some would be receiving less water in order to maintain ecological balance. In 2000, Golden Gate Bird Alliance, as lead plaintiff, sued the SWRCB in failing to properly implement the Water Quality Standards.

Golden Gate Bird Alliance, alongside other organizations, challenged Proposition 4 in 2000, seeking to preserve the Federal Government's ability to control introduced predators in California when necessary for the preservation of endangered species. They sought a court ruling based upon one section of Proposition 4 which stated, "any person, including employees of the federal, state, county, or municipal government to use or authorize the use of any leghold trap, padded or otherwise..." Their efforts were rewarded when Judge Legge ruled in their favor.

In August 2000, Golden Gate Bird Alliance was contacted by neighborhood alliance Friends of the Last Wild Canyon asking for support in their efforts to preserve the canyon adjacent to the Joaquin Miller Park. By 2001, the Butters Land Trust was formed to carry out the neighborhood preservation plans as a legal entity to hold title to the lands and to hold conservation easements. Golden Gate Bird Alliance provided advisory support, expertise, and continued its advisory role by serving on the Butters Land Trust Board of Directors.

In 2002, the East Bay Regional Park District was planning to mow several wide swaths of land in the Berkeley Meadows to mitigate fire dangers before the 4th of July. Golden Gate Bird Alliance members Corinne Greenberg and Kristin Ohlson were determined to protect the Northern Harriers, a State Species of Special Concern, and their nestlings which would be a risk from the mowing. Launching a campaign, backed by Golden Gate Bird Alliance and the Sierra Club, Corinne and Kristin's determination led to the mowing being restricted to two crisscross paths under the supervision of East Bay Regional Park District's biologist and raptor expert Joe DiDonato, with a portion delayed until August.

Golden Gate Bird Alliance joined with other environmental groups to sue for more water in the Klamath Basin refuge area in 2002. Excessive water diversions for agriculture were threatening the Chinook salmon population which relied on enough flow for them to migrate to the ocean. Failure to provide enough flow for the salmon resulted in what's known as the Klamath River Fish Kill of 2002.

In September 2002, Golden Gate Bird Alliance President Miles McKey and Martin Luther King, Jr. Freedom Center President Douglas Siden signed a memorandum of agreement between the two organizations. The agreement combined the goals and efforts of both organizations to strengthen the environmental educational program at the Martin Luther King, Jr. Regional Shoreline Park in Oakland.

Originally starting as an oil spill mitigation project in 2002, Golden Gate Bird Alliance and the Port of San Francisco have continuously worked at Pier 94 to provide healthy habitat for wildlife as an ongoing project. These five-acre tidal wetlands are among the few remaining wetlands along the San Francisco Bay and provide habitat to over 150 species of birds. Wetlands are critical as birds and humans face rising seas and storm surges from climate change.

Beginning in January 2005, Golden Gate Bird Alliance volunteers had monitored the Wildlife Protection Area (WPA) at Crissy Field in San Francisco to document the presence of snowy plovers. Due largely to these efforts, the "Final Recovery Plan for the Western Snowy Plover," released by the U.S. Fish and Wildlife Service in 2008, recognized the WPA as a wintering site for the subspecies.

In April 2006, the Albany City Council voted to support creation of nine acres of new Burrowing Owl habitat at the Albany Plateau in the Eastshore state Park. Upon the initial spotting of a Burrowing Owl at the Plateau, Golden Gate Bird Alliance worked closely with other conservation organizations: The California Department of Fish and Game, the California Department of Parks and Recreation, sports field user groups, and the East Bay Regional Park District. Together they reached a unique compromise between owl habitat and informal recreation.

When the Cosco Busan spilled 58,000 gallons of oil into the Bay in 2007, Golden Gate Bird Alliance volunteers jumped into immediate action as a part of the Oiled Wildlife Care Network, formed in 1994. Over the next two weeks, more than 200 Golden Gate Bird Alliance members identified 2,000 birds in need of rescue.

In 2007, the development for an all-hours freight terminal was proposed by R+L Carriers, located directly adjacent to Martin Luther King, Jr. Regional Shoreline Park. Golden Gate Bird Alliance filed a lawsuit against the Port of Oakland and developed Swann Terminal for failure to perform adequate environmental review of the project's impacts. Golden Gate Bird Alliance also succeeded in compelling a full environmental impact report prior to construction of a second terminal proposed at this site.

Golden Gate Bird Alliance advocated for protecting Breuner Marsh, now the Dotson Family Marsh, in 2008. In 2009, the East Bay Regional Park District decided to use $3 million to begin restoration of the tidal wetlands.

In August 2009, the California Fish and Game Commission approved a plan to protect ocean habitats along 153 square miles of coastline between Half Moon Bay and Mendocino County as part of the Marine Life Protection Act Initiative. Golden Gate Bird Alliance, alongside many other Audubon chapters, contributed support to this effort which protects many species of fish and birds.

Golden Gate Bird Alliance opposed the construction of a bridge across Yosemite Slough as a part of the Lennar development project at Candlestick Point-Hunters Point that was proposed in 2009. An unwillingness to remove the bridge from their project led to Golden Gate Bird Alliance and the San Francisco Bay chapter of the Sierra Club filing a lawsuit challenging the adequacy of the Candlestick Point-Hunters Point Redevelopment Phase II Environmental Impact Report in September 2010. In 2011, Golden Gate Bird Alliance and the Sierra Club signed a settlement with Lennar Development, Inc., in which Lennar would implement measure to reduce impacts from the bridge on adjacent wildlife and provide $2.5 million for the creation of an entirely new wetland on nearby property.

In 2009, Golden Gate Bird Alliance member Della Dash took note of the vulnerability of Burrowing Owls at Cesar Chavez Park. She brought her concerns to Golden Gate Bird Alliance's East Bay Conservation Committee along with an idea of how to protect the owls. After contacting the City of Berkeley, Della succeeded in having a fence erected around the burrows to protect the owls.

On October 30, 2009, a tanker named the Dubai Star spilled over 400 gallons of bunker oil into the San Francisco Bay, about 2.5 miles south of the San Francisco–Oakland Bay Bridge. As a partner in the Oiled Wildlife Care Network, Golden Gate Bird Alliance initiated its oil spill response protocol, calling together the members of its Emergency Response Team, gathering all available information on the spill, and preparing to deploy volunteers if called upon by the Network.

=== 2010s ===
In 2010, Golden Gate Bird Alliance actively participated in the public review and comments regarding the Golden Gate National Recreation Area (GGNRA) Draft Environmental Impact Statement which would determine the pet policy within GGNRA sites. Golden Gate Bird Alliance advocated for the consideration of wildlife and natural resources with regards to proposed off-leash dog policies.

Beginning with a campaign for a voluntary ban on rodenticides called upon by Golden Gate Bird Alliance, the San Francisco Department of the Environment, and Supervisor Malia Cohen – in 2011, Albany passed a resolution urging local businesses to stop selling rat and mouse poisons prohibited under the Environmental Protection Agency's Risk Mitigation Decisions for Ten Rodenticides. In mid-January 2012, Berkeley followed suit. In both cases Golden Gate Bird Alliance vocalized their concerns on the impacts, not only on the rodents, but on predators who would be harmed as well.

San Francisco city officials signed a settlement agreement with Golden Gate Bird Alliance and other community groups in July 2012, that funded a $150,000 study of how event such as the America's Cup, an international sailing competition, affect bird populations on the open bay. The study was part of a package of measures resulting from the efforts of these groups to protect birds during the America's Cup events and provide scientific data to help protect them in the future.

In 2012, Golden Gate Bird Alliance raised the issue of bird-safe buildings with the City of San Francisco. After receiving input on new regulations, San Francisco enacted the country's first municipal bird-safe building standards in October 2012. Following this, Oakland was also approached with similar ideas. Golden Gate Bird Alliance Conservation Project Manager Noreen Weeden, alongside Christine Sheppard of the American Bird Conservancy provided advice on the details and language, and in 2013, Oakland adopted bird safety building measures. The City of Richmond followed suit in November 2016, with rules to help prevent bird-window collisions.

In 2014, Golden Gate Bird Alliance East Bay Conservation Committee convinced the City of Berkeley to abandon a plan to exterminate ground squirrels at Cesar Chavez Park, where wintering Burrowing Owls, depended on squirrel tunnels for shelter. The city agreed to use non-lethal methods to manage the squirrel population instead.

Golden Gate Bird Alliance, as a founding member of the Bay Area Osprey Coalition, helped secure new safe nesting platforms for ospreys near the Richmond Bridge in 2014.

In 2014, through joint legal action with other wildlife organizations, Golden Gate Bird Alliance prevailed on convincing the California Department of Transportation to employ non-lethal methods of excluding cliff swallows from nesting on two highway bridge construction projects in Petaluma.

Following an incident involving injured black-crowned night herons in Downtown Oakland in 2015, Golden Gate Bird Alliance initiated a partnership with the City of Oakland to educate neighbors about the neighborhood nesting heron colony.

Golden Gate Bird Alliance joined other Audubon chapters and Bay Area conservation groups in 2016, to win passage for Measure AA, a multi-county ballot measure that would raise an estimated $500 million for wetlands restoration over the coming 20 years.

In 2016, Golden Gate Bird Alliance worked with the California Department of Transportation and Illuminate the Arts to replace old inefficient static lighting on the Bay Bridge with new LED bulbs and shades that would be less distracting and less disruptive to both birds and marine life.

Together with concerned neighbors and other environmental groups, Golden Gate Bird Alliance urged the East Bay Regional Park District to end lead contamination in the Lake Chabot watershed by closing the Chabot Gun Range, which had been using lead ammunition for over 50 years. The District agreed and the Range closed in September 2016.

In 2019, Golden Gate Bird Alliance's ongoing work at Pier 94 received the Outstanding Environmental Project Award by Friends of the San Francisco Estuary.

== Areas Protected ==
=== Audubon Canyon Ranch (1961 – Present) ===
In the early 1960s, the open spaces of western Marin became threatened by developers looking to build suburban complexes, commercial buildings, and even a nuclear power plant. Dr. Marty Griffin, president of Marin Audubon, responded by launching a campaign to preserve western Marin through strategic land acquisition. In December 1961, Golden Gate Bird Alliance voted to aid Marin Audubon in their efforts. With the goal of raising $300,000, this was the largest project Golden Gate Bird Alliance had undertaken to date.

In 1962, the organizations purchased a 507-acre canyon that held a key egret rookery and would block the proposed freeway route. The area was named Audubon Canyon Ranch and was incorporated as a sanctuary and nature education center. Golden Gate Bird Alliance members launched a grassroots fundraising effort, served as "ranch hosts" or docents, and took part in restoration work days at the new sanctuary.

When Audubon Canyon Ranch was created, the acquisition of Kent Island in Bolinas Lagoon put an end to the intended marina and development proposal that would have destroyed the lagoon. In 1987, Golden Gate Bird Alliance spend $4,000 aiding Marin County in purchasing the one unacquired piece of land on Kent Island, preserving it under the Marin County Open Space District as part of the Bolinas Lagoon Nature Preserve.

=== San Leandro Bay (1938 – present) ===
The San Leandro Bay once encompassed 2,600 acres of tidal marshlands, home to diverse wildlife and plant life. As early as 1938, Golden Gate Bird Alliance unsuccessfully advocated for the creation of a bird sanctuary to protect the nesting California Clapper Rails. As commercial development commenced in the 1960s, sections of the marsh were destroyed or filled in.

In 1971, conservationists won the protection 50-acre Arrowhead Marsh as a refuge. But the Port of Oakland, owning much of the surrounding land, still sought to develop the area. Elsie Roemer, dedicated birder and conservationist, discovered rubble in the newly declared refuge, and publicized the Port's illegal filling of the protected area. Roemer then led a citizens' advisory group regarding the marsh's future. The outcome included the transfer of 565 acres from the Port to the East Bay Regional Park District in 1975. This land would form core of today's Martin Luther King, Jr. Regional Shoreline.

In the mid-1980s, the Port of Oakland proposed filling 180 acres of seasonal wetlands near Arrowhead Marsh. Golden Gate Bird Alliance partnered with Citizens for Alameda's Last Marshlands and sued the Port and ultimately won a settlement that required the Port to restore 73 acres as a wetland, an area known today as the New Marsh. The victory in Federal Court also required the Port of Oakland to produce an Environmental Impact Report (EIR) prior to any development actions.

In 2005, the construction of a casino was proposed at Arrowhead Marsh, adjacent to the Martin Luther King, Jr. Regional Shoreline Park. Golden Gate Bird Alliance members, speaking out against the casino due to the environmental impacts, aided in the dismissal of the casino project and the protection of the wetlands.

=== Alameda Naval Air Station ===
Documented in the 1980's, the endangered Least Terns were found breeding in Alameda. Adopting the Alameda Naval Air Station as a nesting ground, the Least Terns used the gravelly tarmac as a substitution for the declining number of isolated sandy beaches. Over the next 30 years, the naval base went through decommissioning and potential development which threatened the breeding grounds of the Least Terns. During this period, Golden Gate Bird Alliance undertook numerous efforts to protect the terns.

Leora Feeney, a member of Golden Gate Bird Alliance, formed an internal Friends of the Alameda Wildlife Reserve Committee (FAWR) which worked with the U.S. Fish and Wildlife Service to monitor the tern colony. FAWR sponsored a symposium on wildlife at the naval base, educated thousands of Alameda schoolchildren about the Least Terns, and lobbied for the terns in Washington, D.C., with Golden Gate Bird Alliance's executive director Arthur Feinstein.

In 2014, the U.S. Department of Veterans Affairs officially assumed responsibility for the former base. The area was declared a permanent wildlife reserve, including the endangered Least Tern breeding area.

Golden Gate Bird Alliance still monitors the Least Tern colony at the Naval Air Station. They coordinate with East Bay Regional Parks to offer an annual excursion to the Alameda Naval Air Station to view the breeding grounds.

=== Altamont Pass ===
In 2004, Golden Gate Bird Alliance joined with the Center for Biological Diversity and Californians for Renewable Energy to appeal the County of Alameda's approval of 18 permits for wind turbines operating at Altamont Pass. These 20-year permits were offered without requirements for impact mitigation, nor environmental review under the California Environmental Quality Act. This would not only ignore the impacts on raptor populations caused by wind turbines, but would exacerbate the issue. In 2005, Golden Gate Bird Alliance and other Bay Area Audubon chapters sued Alameda County and the wind companies for failing to prevent the death of thousands of state- and federally-protected birds each year. Golden Gate Bird Alliance negotiated a settlement with the county and the wind companies that required them to modernize their facilities and site turbines in ways that are compatible with sustaining bird and bat populations in the Altamont. Golden Gate Audubon's efforts resulted in worldwide attention to mitigating the negative impacts from wind energy.

The avian threat at Altamont Pass continues to be an issue. In 2021, Golden Gate Bird Alliance, Mt. Diablo Audubon Society, Ohlone Audubon Society, and Santa Clara Valley Audubon Society joined the National Audubon Society in another lawsuit against Alameda over their approval of a new, 80-megawatt wind turbine facility. The settlement required new updates such as the integration of IdentiFlight, a way to identify approaching raptors and temporarily stopping the turbines before the raptors enter rotor range. The legal pressures from Golden Gate Bird Alliance and others have pushed Alameda to continue updating the windfarms as new technologies provide new mitigation possibilities.

== Name change ==
Golden Gate Bird Alliance changed its name from Golden Gate Audubon Society on August 17, 2023.

GGBA was at least the third local organization to drop "Audubon" from its name, and the first to adopt "Bird Alliance" instead. As of June 6, 2024, 31 Audubon groups had changed their names, 23 of those following Golden Gate in adding "Bird Alliance" to their new names. More than 50 other chapters have begun the renaming process, including at least 12 chapters that have formally announced changes, but have not yet selected a new name.

Originally named for John James Audubon, an illustrator and naturalist, his controversial character gave rise to a movement among Audubon Societies to change their name. John James Audubon was a perpetuator of slavery and racism, as well as a body snatcher from native burial sites. Although National Audubon decided against a name change, many branches of the Society implemented their own changes. Many chapters, including New York, Chicago, and Madison, commit to dropping Audubon from their name. Other chapters announced their own name changes; Seattle's branch was renamed Birds Connect Seattle, and the Audubon Naturalist Society in Washington, D.C., became Nature Forward.

== Current activities ==
=== The Gull ===
Golden Gate Bird Alliance publishes a quarterly magazine called The Gull. The Gull provides news articles, conservation updates, announcements, and other seasonal information for members. A physical copy is sent out to Golden Gate Bird Alliance members, while a digital copy can be found online.

=== Lights Out for Birds ===
Golden Gate Bird Alliance is a strong supporter of the Lights Out for Birds program, which endorses individuals and companies to turn off building lights from dusk until dawn during migration season.

=== Field trips ===
Golden Gate Bird Alliance offers more than 200 field trips annually. The trips range from local parks to farther locations in Northern California and are led by volunteers. They also offers several big trips that span the globe. The trips vary from 1 to 2 weeks, and are coordinated through the organization.

=== Birdathon ===
Birdathon is Golden Gate Bird Alliance's largest annual fundraiser spanning from March to May. During this time Golden Gate Bird Alliance encourages individual fundraising campaigns where donors pledge money for each species identified. They offer unique Birdathon-only tours as well as facilitate the Bay Birding Challenge, where birding teams compete to find the most bird species. They also host a Birdathon Auction where supporters bid on exciting nature experiences. The Birdathon ends with a celebratory gathering to share stories and experiences.

=== Christmas Bird Count ===
Golden Gate Bird Alliance sponsors three Christmas Bird Counts: San Francisco, Oakland, and Richmond. The Christmas Bird Count is an annual census of birds organized by the National Audubon Society throughout the U.S. and Canada. It was originally started as a way to promote an alternative to another tradition, the Christmas Side Hunt, in which hunters would compete to kill animals and birds. Instead, Christmas Bird Count encourages citizen science through volunteer birdwatchers. Each count occurs within a 15-mile diameter circle and is organized by a count compiler. Volunteers follow preplanned routes and all birds heard and viewed are tallied among the count. The collected data is utilized in conservation biology among other sciences.

=== Osprey Cam ===
The Golden Gate Bird Alliance Osprey Camera (Osprey Cam) is located on the Whirley Crane at Richmond's Naval Shipyard No. 3. The camera focuses on a nest atop the crane belonging to two ospreys, known as Rosie and Richmond. Through the Osprey Cam, viewers can watch as Rosie and Richmond enter nesting season, take care of eggs, and raise their young. The Osprey Cam live chat is a place to discuss ospreys, and air questions about behaviors or related topics. The live chat is also a place to call out observations of fish being brought to the nest, to track the ospreys' dietary trends.

== Conservation Committees ==
=== San Francisco Conservation Committee ===
The San Francisco Conservation Committee is dedicated maintaining avian diversity within the urban landscape. They work to protect habitats and improve the city's parks and hospitableness towards wildlife.

=== East Bay Conservation Committee ===
The East Bay Conservation Committee is dedicated to the preservation and conservation of wildlife in the East Bay. They carry out a number of restoration projects in western Alameda County and Contra Costa County.

=== Friends of the Alameda Wildlife Reserve ===
Friends of the Alameda Wildlife Reserve (FAWR) was originally formed for the protection of the Least Terns at the former Alameda Naval Air Station turned federal wildlife reserve. FAWR continues to support the reserve while also conducting bi-monthly survey on the reserve.

== Education ==
=== Speaker Series ===
Golden Gate Bird Alliance provides monthly speakers who talk about nature or bird related topics in their Speaker Series.

=== Eco-Education ===
Golden Gate Bird Alliance's Eco-Education is a program for 3rd-5th graders that teaches ecology. The Eco-Education program has won awards for its efforts in environmental and ecological education:

- Governor's Environmental and Economic Leadership Award for Children's Environmental Education – 2008
- Outstanding Service Award from the North American Association for Environmental Education – 2009
- Alameda County Watershed Confluence Youth Program Award – 2018

=== Classes ===
Golden Gate Bird Alliance offers classes for both members and the public. Golden Gate Bird Alliance also offers a Birding for Everyone Scholarship which is awarded to 10 recipients annually.

=== Rotary Nature Center ===
Golden Gate Bird Alliance offered classes at the Lake Merritt Rotary Nature Center on nature journaling.
