= Albany Beach =

Beach in California

Coordinates: 37.889°N 122.316°W

Albany Beach is a sand beach located in Albany, California on the east shore of San Francisco Bay.

The wide beach is backed by low dunes with scenic access to the East Bay shoreline. The beach is a frequent launch area for kayakers in calm conditions and kiteboarders when it is windy. It is also popular with dog walkers and beachgoers.

== Situation ==
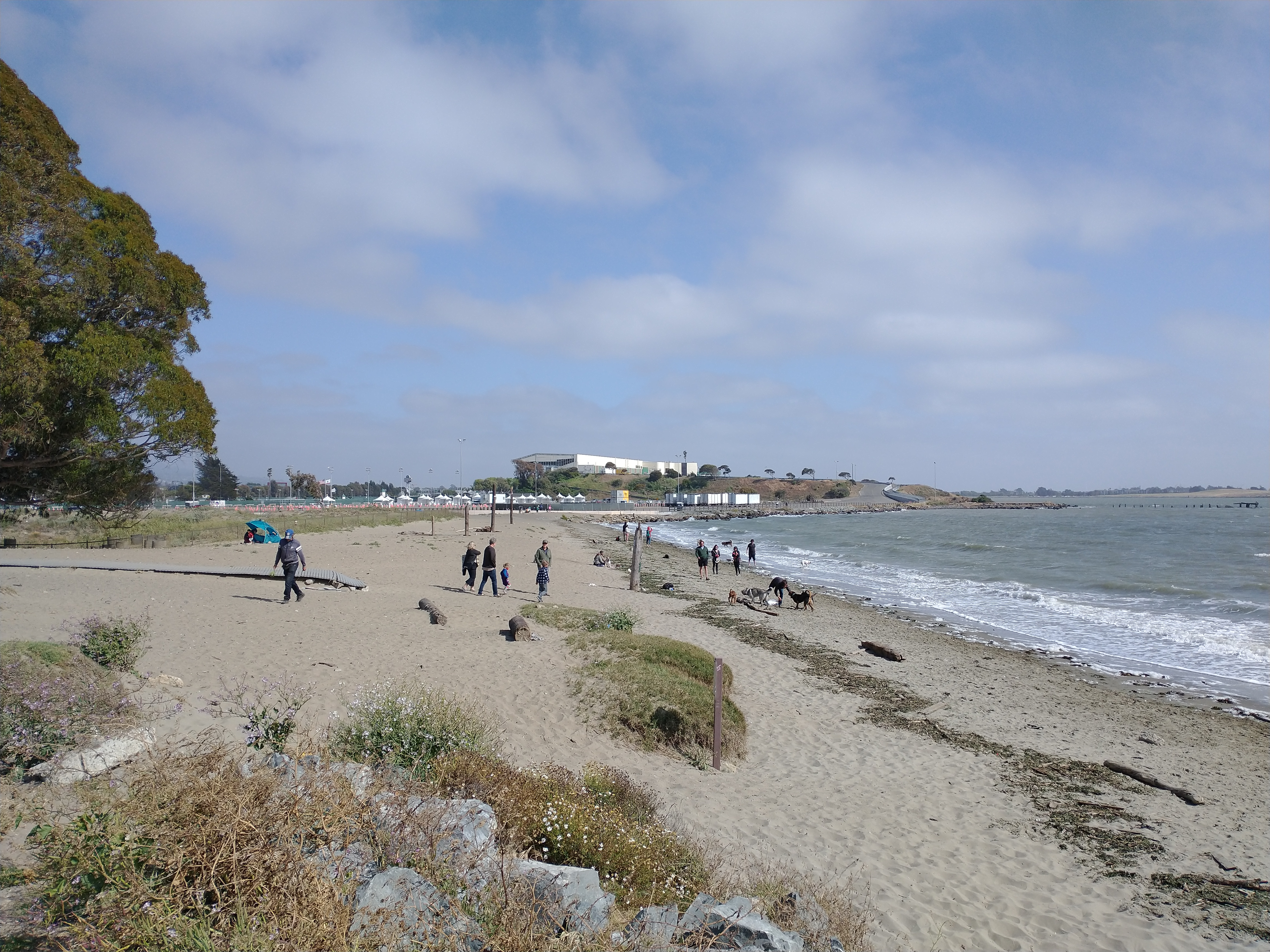

The beach is part of Albany Waterfront Park. It is located across from the Albany Bulb and Golden Gate Fields racetrack. It can be accessed by the Racetrack shuttle from North Berkeley BART station.

== See also ==
- List of beaches in California
- List of California state parks
