= Emeryville Crescent State Marine Reserve =

Marine reserve of California, United States

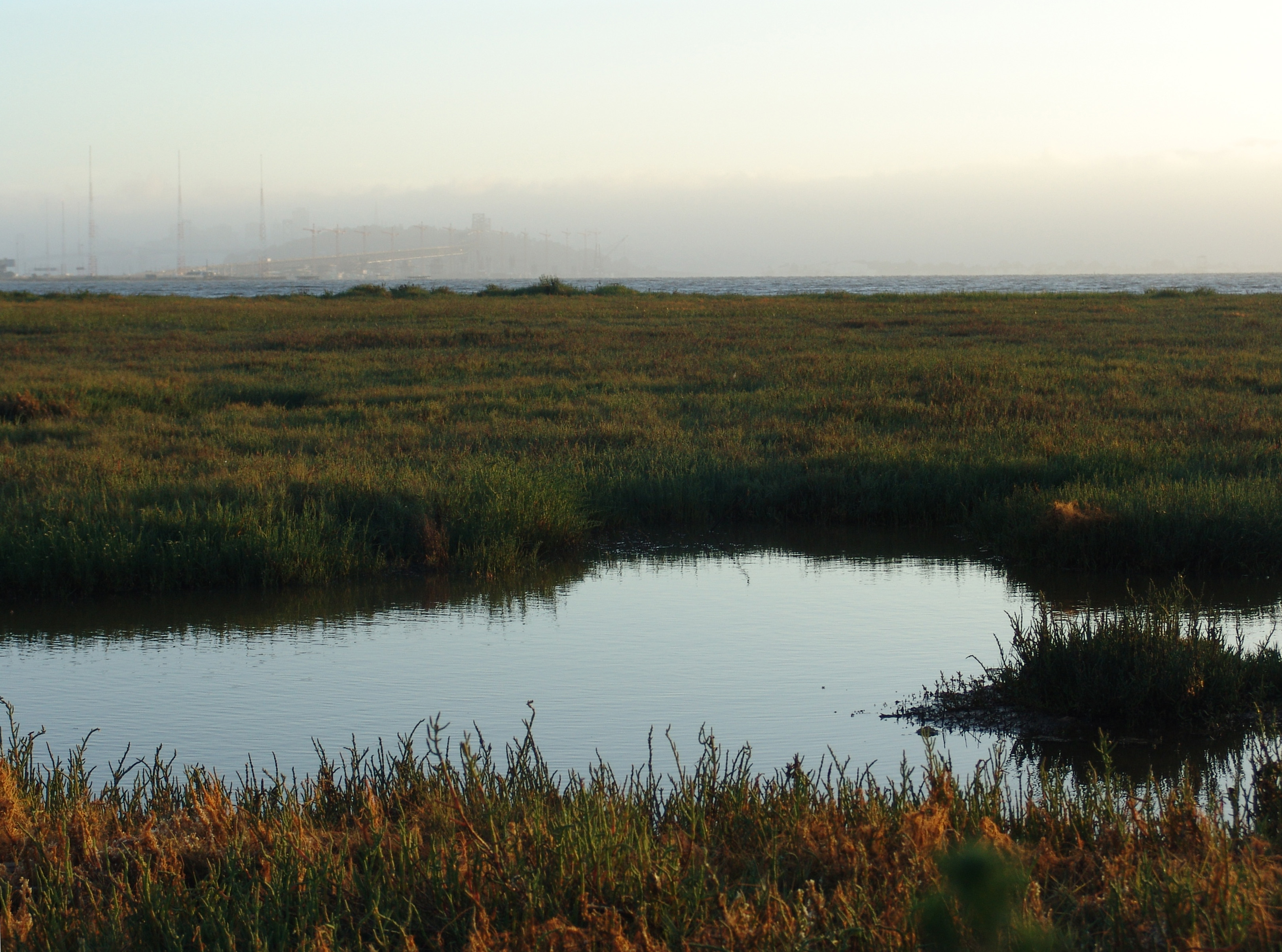
- Emeryville Crescent Marsh with the Bay Bridge in the background

- Location within Oakland, California Location within San Francisco Bay Area Location within California Location within the United States
- Location: Alameda and Contra Costa Counties, California, United States
- Nearest city: Emeryville, California
- Coordinates: 37°49′55″N 122°18′24″W
- Established: 1985
- Governing body: California Department of Parks and Recreation

Emeryville Crescent State Marine Reserve is a marine reserve of California, United States, preserving marshland on the east shore of San Francisco Bay. It is managed as part of Eastshore State Park by the East Bay Regional Park District. The 103.5-acre (41.9 ha) marsh stretches from the eastern approach of the San Francisco–Oakland Bay Bridge in Oakland to the foot of Powell Street in Emeryville. The reserve encompasses the entire Emeryville Crescent Marsh and is named as such for its crescent shape. It was established in 1985.

Temescal Creek drains into the marshes near the Emeryville–Oakland border on the eastern midpoint of the marshlands. The wetlands are made up of native species of pickleweed, and are currently being threatened by Spartina, a non-native invasive species of Cordgrass. It has invaded 2.4 acres (0.97 ha) or 2.5% of the wetlands. There is an active abatement program consisting of aquatic herbicides.

The park is often used as a recreational area by local fishers and dog-walkers. The reserve is also noted for various problem areas such as unauthorized camping, petty littering, and dumping large articles of garbage such as TVs and refrigerators.

== See also ==
- List of California state parks
