= Urban Creeks Council =

Land stewardship group in California, US

The Urban Creeks Council is a Berkeley, California, non-profit organization that promotes stewardship of San Francisco Bay creeks and habitat restoration around them. The council was founded in 1982 and is based in West Berkeley.

In 2001 the organization was involved in fighting development in Orinda that could jeopardize creeks, and continuous wildlife habitat between Tilden Regional Park and Robert Sibley Volcanic Regional Preserve.

The organization is said to have both inspired and made it possible for "friends of" organizations such as Friends of the Five Creeks and Friends of Orinda Creeks to succeed.
