= El Cerrito Plaza =

Coordinates: 37.899737°N 122.299756°W

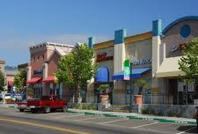
- Street-facing storefronts on the northern end of the center.
- Location: San Pablo Avenue and Fairmont Avenue, El Cerrito, California, United States
- Opened: 1958
- Owner: Regency Centers Corporation
- Num. of stores: 70
- Num. of anchor tenants: 7
- Floor area: 350,000 square feet (33,000 m^{2})
- Floors: 2
- Public transit: El Cerrito Plaza
- Website: www.elcerritoplaza.com

El Cerrito Plaza is a shopping center in El Cerrito, California, a suburb in the San Francisco Bay Area.

== Location ==
El Cerrito Plaza is located on the southern border of El Cerrito (adjacent to the city of Albany) between San Pablo Avenue and the BART rail tracks. Directly to the north is the El Cerrito Plaza BART station. The plaza is also accessible via the Ohlone Greenway, which is under the BART rail tracks. The greenway connects to both the El Cerrito Plaza BART station and the El Cerrito Plaza.

== History ==
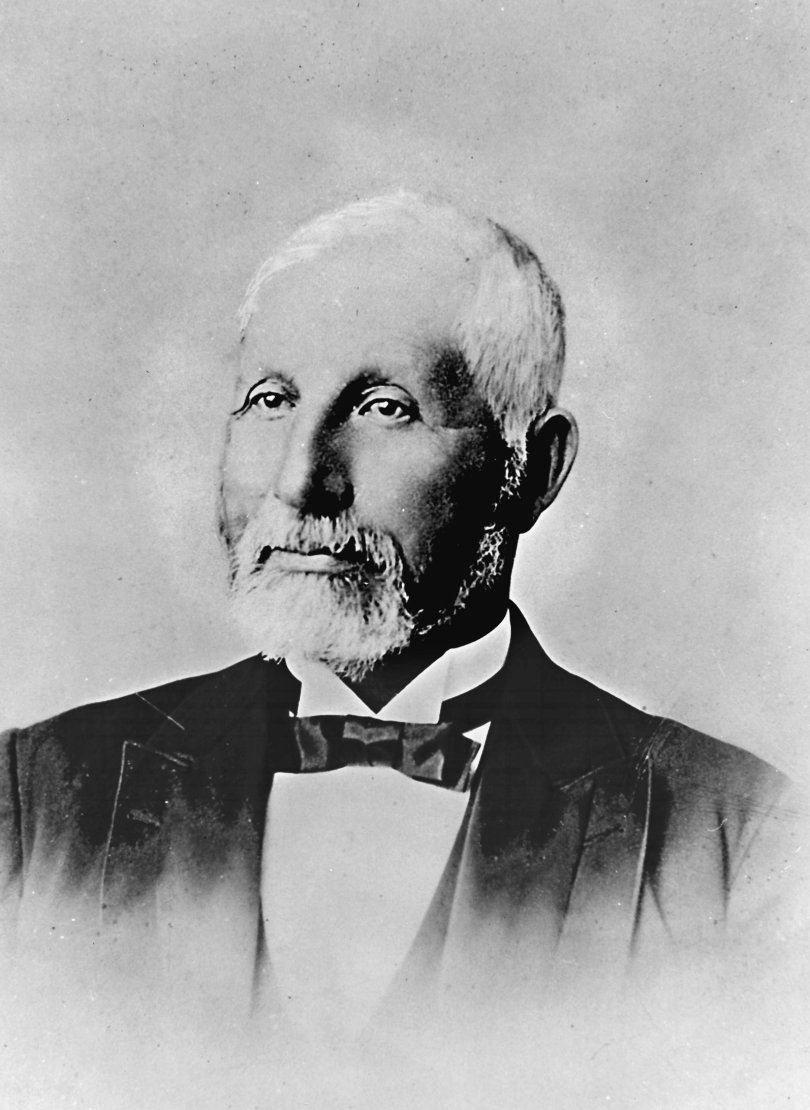
Don Víctor Castro, a Californio ranchero and politician, built an adobe for his family where El Cerrito Plaza stands today. He died there in 1900.

El Cerrito Plaza is located on a part of the June 12, 1834 Rancho San Pablo Mexican land grant to Francisco María Castro. Several buildings were constructed by the Castro family over the years. Víctor Castro, Francisco's son, built his wood frame adobe home here in the early 19th century and it remained standing until it burned down in 1956, shortly before the original shopping center was built. Castro was initially buried, along with four of his children, in what is now the El Cerrito Plaza shopping center.

During the 1930s, the Castro adobe housed a gambling casino, and the eastern side of the current Plaza housed a dog racing track. After the track closed, its parking lot housed a trailer park for Kaiser shipyard workers, with the track field area used by El Cerrito High School. In the late 1940s, a drive in theatre (Cerrito Motor Movies) was built there and operated until the mid-1950s.

The April 21, 1956 fire destroying the Castro adobe was a work of arson, presumably to make way for the plaza. The site's developers refused to build around the historic building and a campaign was being mounted to save the site when the fire occurred. This act of arson was never prosecuted.

El Cerrito Plaza originally opened in 1958 as a 350,000-square-foot (33,000 m^{2}) regional mall, centered on a Capwell's department store. The plaza originally had a variety of restaurants such as Kirby's, Chevys Fresh Mex, Chuck E. Cheese, and many other eateries.

El Cerrito Plaza began to decline with the 1976 opening of Hilltop Mall as well as the opening of other malls in Concord and Walnut Creek. Many shoppers also turned to nearby Fourth Street in Berkeley and retail developments in Emeryville. The closures of the Woolworth's store in 1993 and the Emporium (formerly Capwell's) anchor store in 1996 further accelerated the Plaza's decline.

In 2002, El Cerrito Plaza was partly demolished, remodeled, and reopened in its present form. The San Francisco Chronicle panned the newly reconstructed Plaza, calling it "in a nutshell, dysfunctional and dull" and an example that "[i]f a city doesn't insist on good development and then stick to its guns, things can go from bad to worse."

In 2003, as part of the renovation, the shopping center's parking lot was drawn back from the edge of channelized Cerrito Creek, which runs along the southern boundary of the Plaza, and marks the boundary separating Alameda and Contra Costa Counties. The creek was re-contoured to give it a more natural flow pattern, planted with native vegetation, and edged with a pathway with seating walls by Friends of the Five Creeks.

== Events ==
A Farmers' Market is held at the Plaza every Tuesday and Saturday.

== Stores ==
The following is a partial listing of retail stores and restaurants at El Cerrito Plaza.

=== Anchors ===
- CVS Pharmacy
- Lucky Stores
- Marshalls
- Petco
- Ross Dress For Less
- Trader Joe's

=== Restaurants and eateries ===
- All Star Donuts
- California Fish Grill
- Chef's Chinese Food
- Dave's Hot Chicken
- Ike's Sandwiches
- Jamba Juice
- Kyoto Ramen and Curry House
- M2 Burger
- Panda Express
- Romano's Macaroni Grill
- Starbucks
- Taqueria La Cocina
- Wingstop
- Yammy Sushi

=== Services ===
- Joshua Tree Chiropractic
- Goat Insurance Services Inc.
- Goat Tax Services
- Albany Music School
- Ojas Yoga Center

=== Other retail stores ===
- AT&T
- Daiso (replaced Pier 1 Imports and opened in the summer of 2016)
- See's Candies
- T-Mobile
- Xfinity
- Verizon Wireless
- The UPS Store
