= Alvarado Adobe =

Historical Landmark in San Pablo, California, United States

Alvarado Adobe Alvarado Adobe Museum
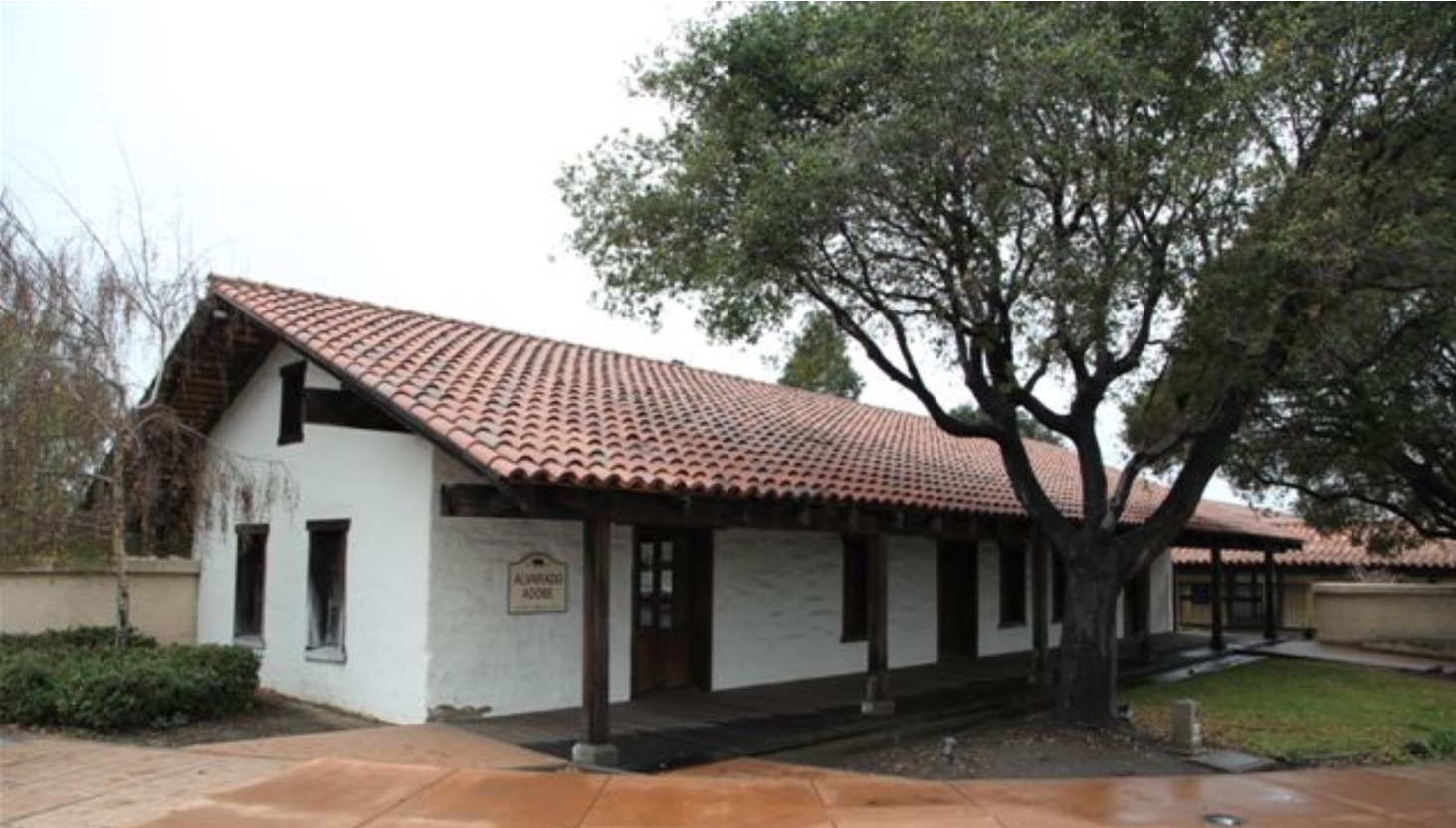
- Alvarado Adobe

- Location within California Location within the United States
- 37.958722°N 122.340866°W
- Location: San Pablo, California

History
- Built: 1842

California Historical Landmark
- Reference no.: 512

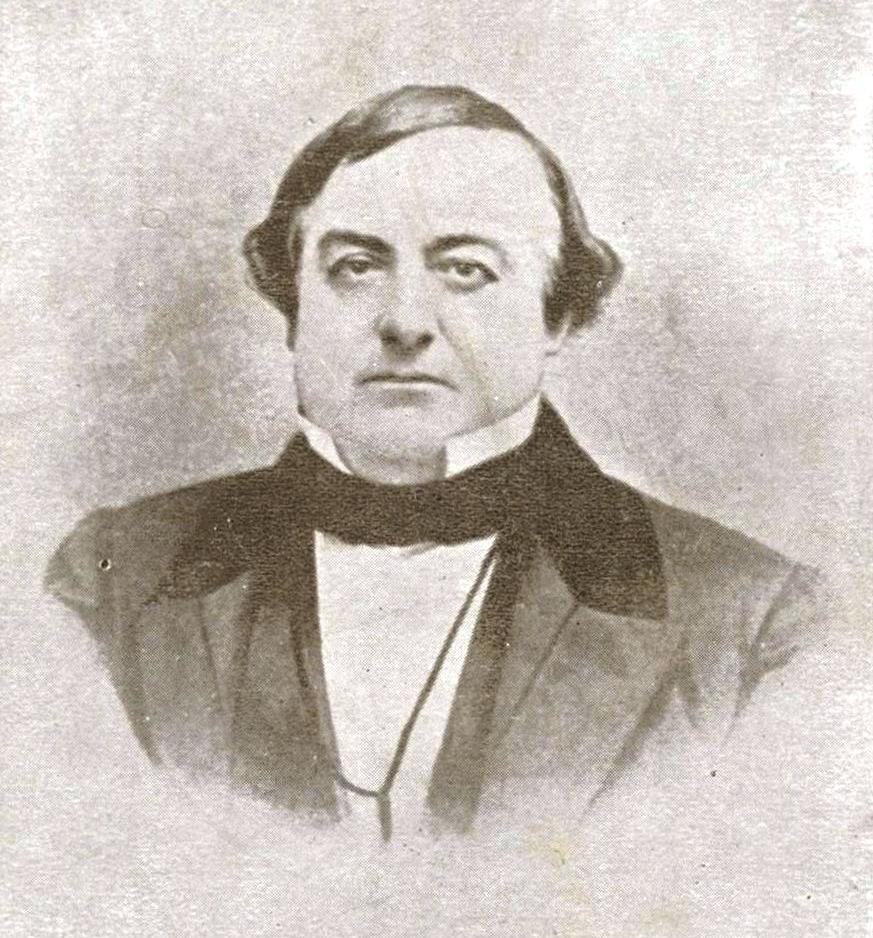
Juan Bautista Alvarado

Alvarado Adobe is a historical adobe house in San Pablo, California in Contra Costa County. Jesús María Castro built the Adobe house for his monther Dona Gabriéla Berryessa de Castro in 1842. At that time, Dona Gabriéla Berryessa de Castro was the widow of Californio landowner Francisco María Castro (1770–1831). After the Mexican secularization, Castro was granted Rancho San Pablo (Cuchiyunes) in 1823 by Governor Luís Antonio Argüello. The land had previously been grazing land for cattle belonging to the Mission San Francisco de Asís, but was secularized by the First Mexican Republic. Castro and his family moved to the rancho in 1824. At Alvarado Adobe, Castro also built grape arbor, and planted gardens. In 1851, Dona Gabriéla died, and the adobe house was passed down to her daughter, Martina Castro de Alvarado, who married Juan Bautista Alvarado, who was Governor of California from 1836 to 1842. The Adobe is named after Juan Bautista Alvarado. Alvarado/Castro descendants sold parts of the Rancho to American ranchers and farmers and town grew around the Alvarado Adobe. Today the house is the Alvarado Adobe Museum. The Alvarado Square Civic Center opened in November 1978 at the site of the Alvarado/Castro home. A replica of the Alvarado adobe home was built at the Alvarado Square complex. In March 1974, the historical wooden structures at Hilltop, Blume House and Bunk House were moved to the Alvarado Square complex and opened as museums in 1979. The original Alvarado Adobe was demolished in August 1954 to build an expansion for the Alvarado Motel owned by John R Maloney. ^{[7]}
