= Rancho El Sobrante =

Mexican land grant in California

Coordinates: 37.930°N 122.230°W

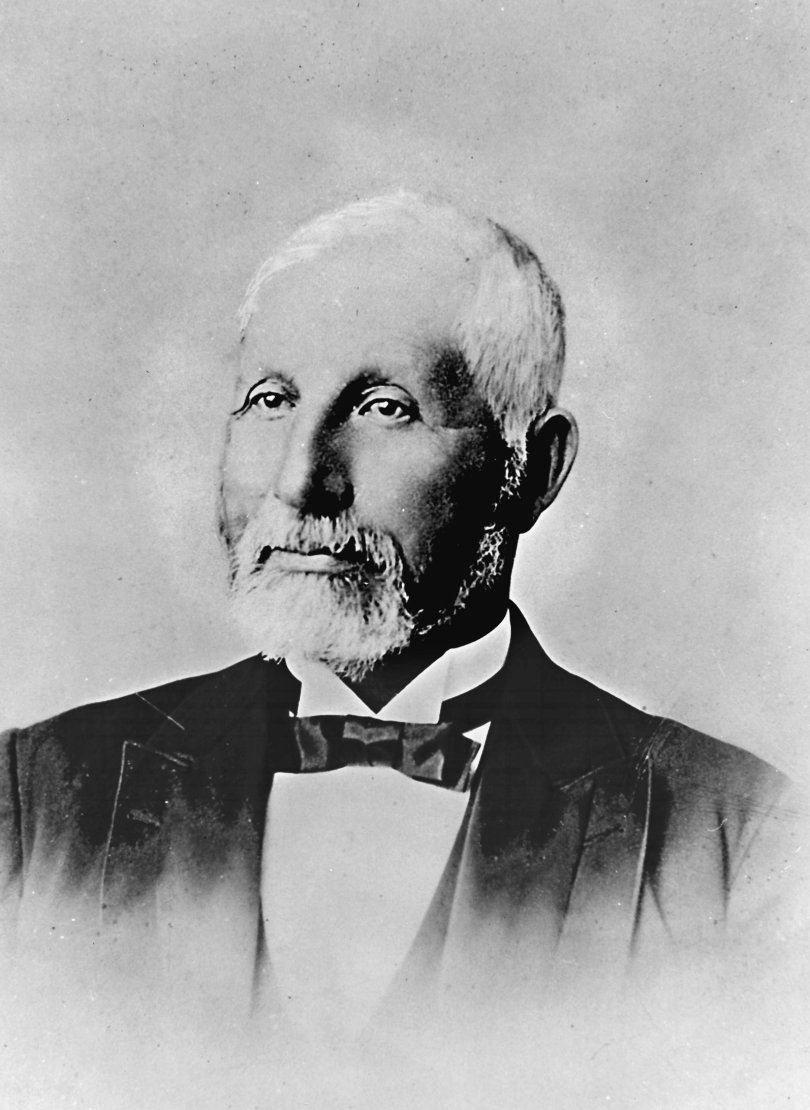
Don Víctor Castro, a Californio ranchero and politician, was granted Rancho El Sobrante in 1841.

Rancho El Sobrante was a 20,565-acre (83.22 km^{2}) Mexican land grant in present-day Contra Costa County, California given in 1841 by Governor Juan Alvarado to Juan Jose Castro and Victor Castro. The name refers to a "surplus" in Spanish—the grant's boundaries were determined by the boundaries of the surrounding grants: San Antonio, San Pablo, El Pinole, La Boca de la Cañada del Pinole, Acalanes, and La Laguna de los Palos Colorados. This grant included the area between present day El Sobrante and Orinda.

== History ==
Brothers Juan Jose Castro (1803–1869) and Victor Ramon Castro (1817–1897) were among the eleven children of Francisco María Castro (1775–1831) and María Gabriela Berreyesa (1780–1851). Francisco Castro had been a soldier at San Francisco, who after serving as alcalde and in other public offices, was granted Rancho San Pablo in 1823. Juan Castro and Victor Castro served in the San Francisco militia.

Juan Alvarado, married María Martina Castro (1814–1875) in 1839, and was thus brother-in-law to Juan Jose Castro and Victor Castro. Juan Castro was grantee of Yerba Buena Island in 1838, and Victor Castro was grantee of Mare Island in 1841. But neither brother settled permanently, and both grants were rejected by the Public Land Commission. Juan Castro and Victor Castro then identified an area of land which was not described in any land grants of the time, and applied for a grant for Rancho El Sobrante.

Victor Castro built a two-story adobe dwelling in what is now El Cerrito, and became one of the first members of the Board of Supervisors of Contra Costa County in 1852.

With the cession of California to the United States following the Mexican-American War, the 1848 Treaty of Guadalupe Hidalgo provided that the land grants would be honored. As required by the Land Act of 1851, a claim for Rancho El Sobrante was filed with the Public Land Commission by Juan José Castro and Victor Castro in 1852. The sobrante grant presented a complicated case of land ownership when it came into the U.S. courts. The area was entirely surrounded by other grants and its boundaries determined by the boundaries of the surrounding grants. After legal conflicts lasting more than three decades, a grant of over 20,000 acres (81 km^{2}) was patented to Juan José Castro and Victor Castro in 1883.

A square league of 3,872 acres (15.7 km^{2}) was sold in 1847 to Ward and Smith, a San Francisco merchant business. A square league of 4,098 acres (16.6 km^{2}) was sold in 1860 by Victor Castro to Eugene Kelly and G.H. Woodruff, San Francisco bankers. By 1893, a survey map shows Victor Castro (Juan Jose had died) as the owner of just 549 acres (2.2 km^{2}). Thousands of acres had gone to pay attorneys' fees in long struggles in the courts, against both more or less legitimate claimants and plagues of squatters who tried to profit from the Castros' troubles. More lawsuits were filed until 1909, when the final partition decree settled legal ownership of the land within Rancho El Sobrante.

== See also ==
- Ranchos of Contra Costa County, California
