= San Pablo, California =

City in California, United States

- City
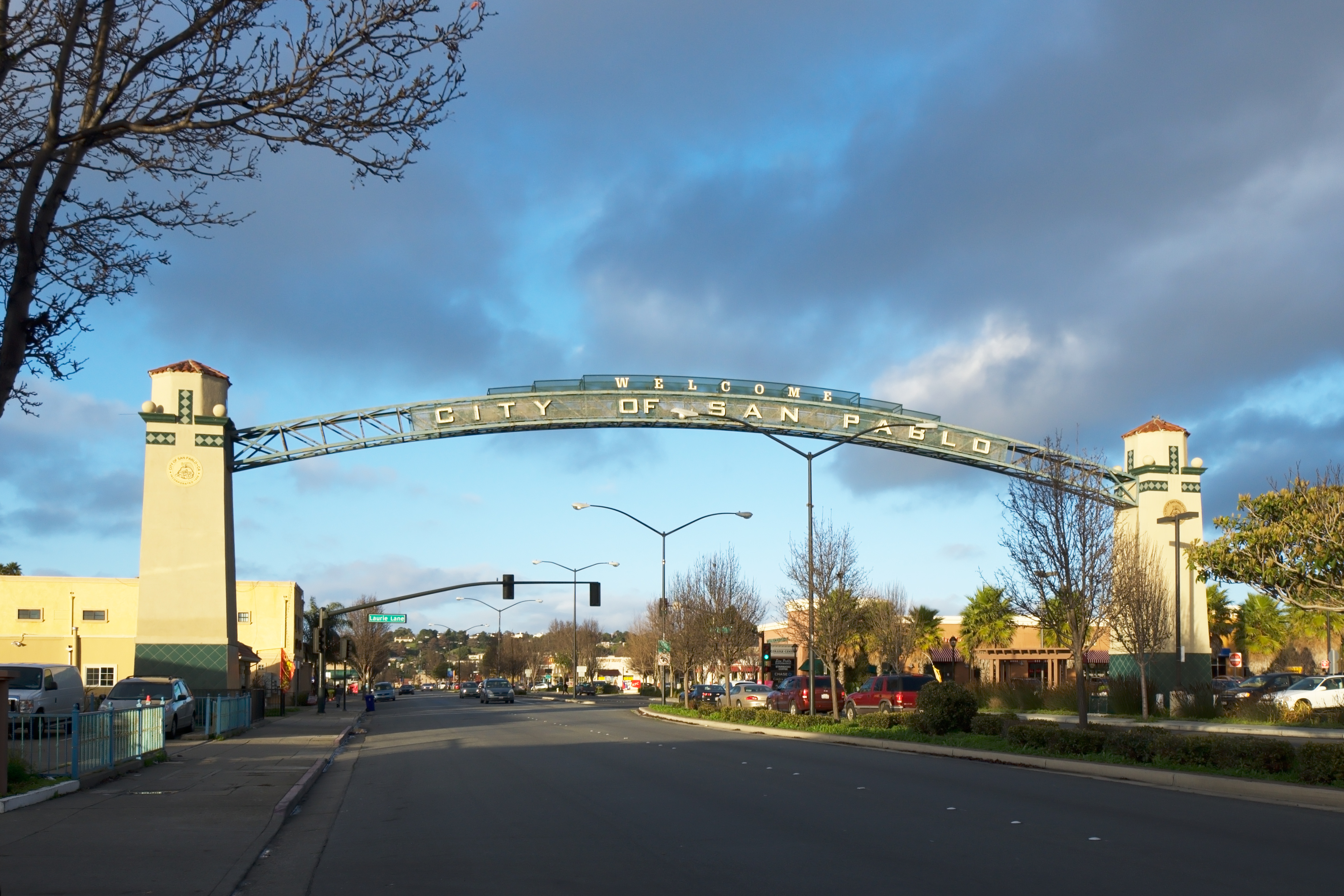
- Welcome sign over San Pablo Avenue

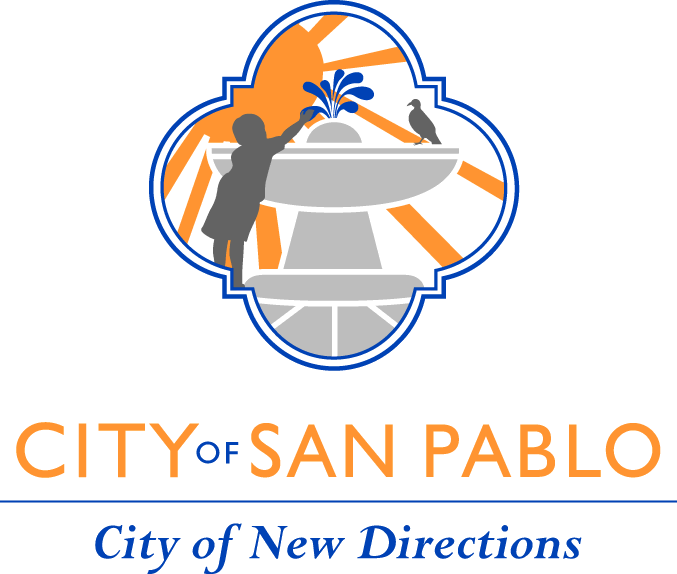
- Motto: "City of New Directions"
- Interactive map of San Pablo, California
- Location in the United States
- Coordinates: 37°57′44″N 122°20′44″W
- Country: United States
- State: California
- County: Contra Costa
- Incorporated: April 27, 1948

Government
  - Mayor: Elizabeth Pabon-Alvarado
  - County Board: District 1: John Gioia
  - State Senator: Jesse Arreguín (D)
  - State Assembly: Buffy Wicks (D)
  - U. S. Congress: John Garamendi (D)

Area
  - Total: 2.63 sq mi (6.80 km^{2})
  - Land: 2.63 sq mi (6.80 km^{2})
  - Water: 0 sq mi (0.00 km^{2}) 0%
- Elevation: 52 ft (16 m)

Population (2020)
  - Total: 32,127
  - Density: 12,243.5/sq mi (4,727.2/km^{2})
- Time zone: UTC-8 (PST)
  - Summer (DST): UTC-7 (PDT)
- ZIP code: 94806
- Area codes: 510, 341
- FIPS code: 06-68294
- GNIS feature IDs: 1659586, 2411801
- Website: sanpabloca.gov

San Pablo (Spanish for "Saint Paul") is an enclave city in Contra Costa County, California, United States. The population was 32,127 at the 2020 census. As of 2026, the city council consists of Mayor Elizabeth Pabon-Alvarado, Vice Mayor Rita Xavier, Abel Pineda, Patricia Ponce, and Arturo Cruz. Dorothy Gantt is the city Clerk. Viviana Toledo is the city treasurer.

== History ==
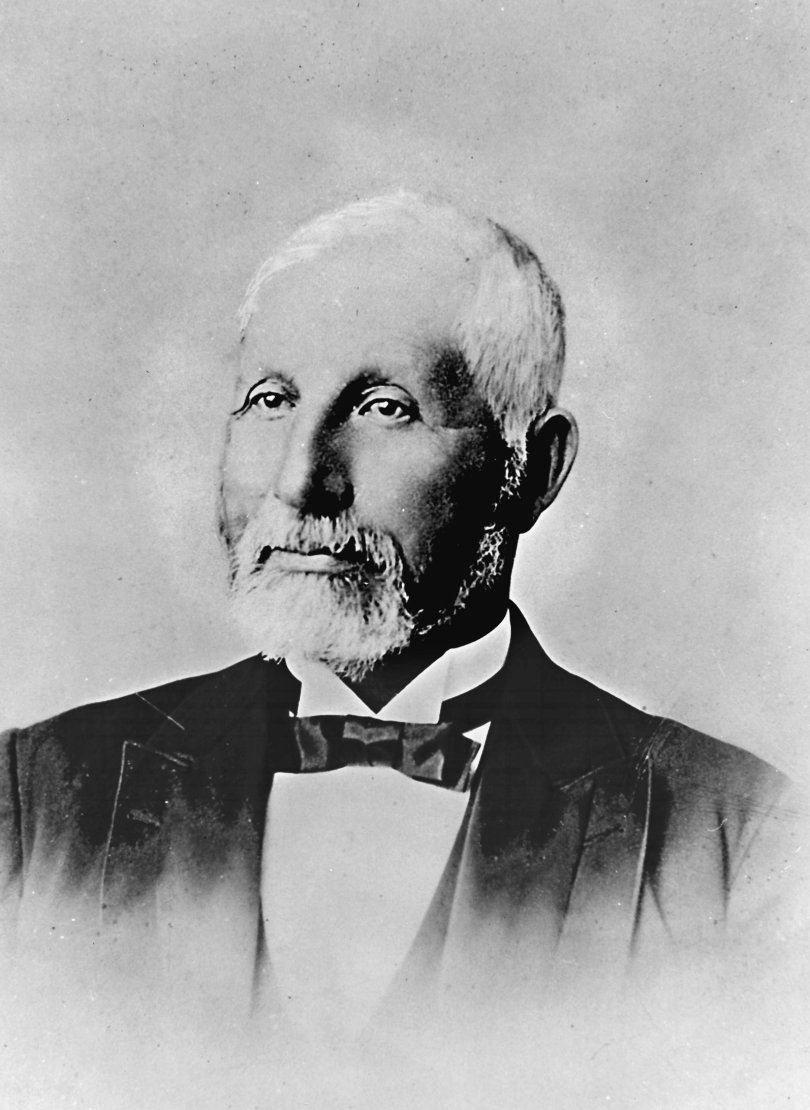
San Pablo traces its history to Rancho San Pablo, a Mexican-era rancho granted to Francisco María Castro in 1823 and reconfirmed to his son Don Víctor Castro, a noted Californio ranchero and politician (pictured), in 1834.

The city of San Pablo is on land once occupied by the Cuchiyun band of the Ohlone indigenous people. This Ohlone territory was claimed for the king of Spain in the late 18th century, and was granted for grazing purposes to the Mission Dolores located in today's San Francisco, but these church properties were secularized when Mexico became independent from Spain in 1821.

In 1823, Mexican governor Luís Antonio Argüello granted the Ohlone territory to Francisco María Castro, an ex-soldier stationed at the San Francisco Presidio. The grant was given the name Rancho San Pablo. This is the origin of the city's name, as well as the name of one the East Bay's oldest principal roads: San Pablo Avenue (formerly known, during the Spanish colonial era, as El Camino Real de la Contra Costa, which means "The Royal Way of the Opposite Coast," referring to the coastal/bayshore region opposite San Francisco). San Pablo Avenue, originating in San Pablo, runs through the entire East Bay.

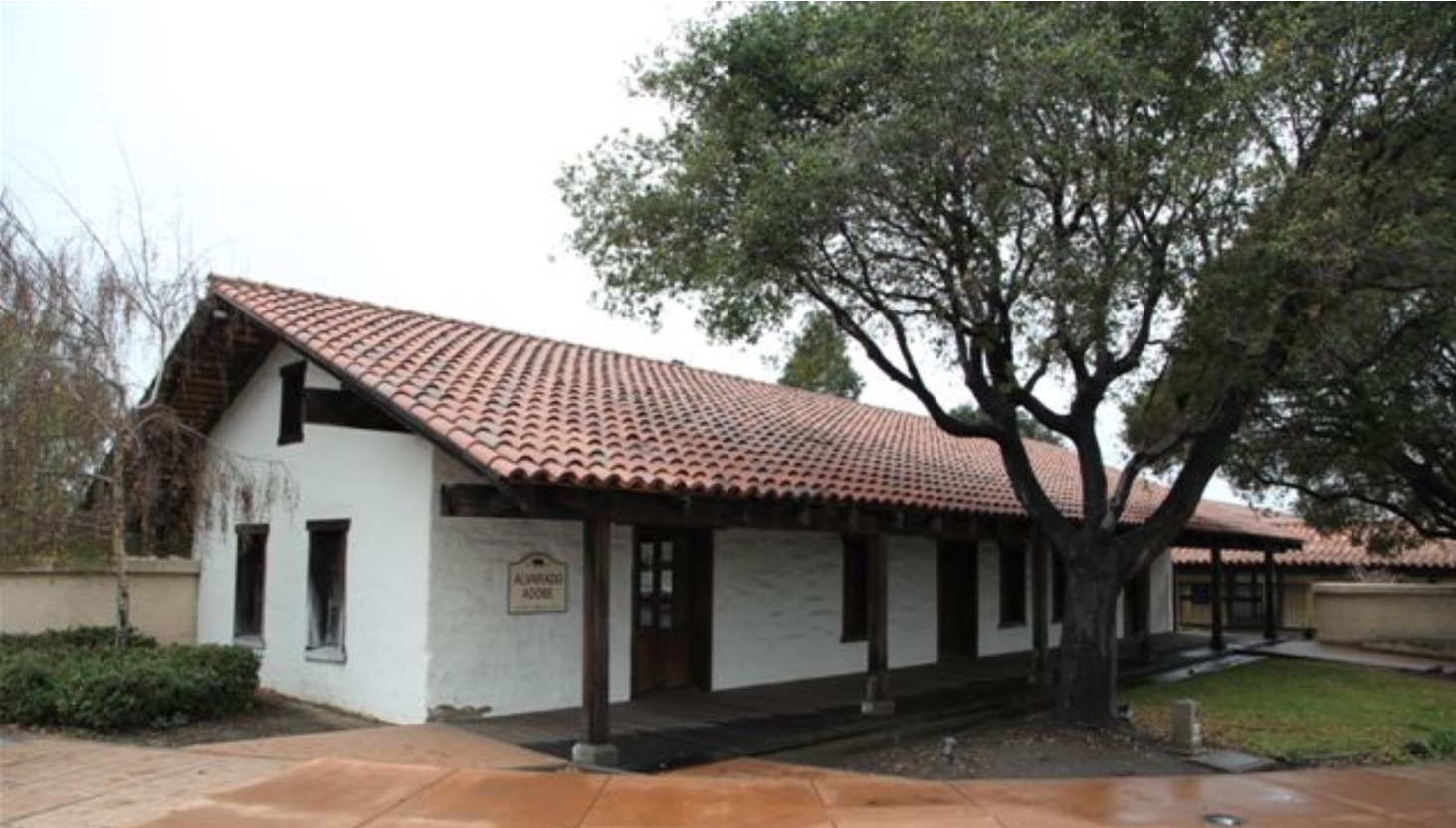
Alvarado Adobe

San Pablo's Alvarado Adobe has been designated a California State Landmark (No.512), as a historic reproduction of the city's Mexican era. The home was originally constructed in 1842 by Jesús Maria Castro, one of Francisco Castro's sons, for his mother, Gabriéla Berryessa de Castro. Upon Gabriéla's death in 1851, it was inherited by her daughter, Martina Castro de Alvarado, wife of Juan Bautista Alvarado, who was Governor of California from 1836 to 1842. The Alvarado Adobe was demolished in the mid-20th century to make way for a motel. A reproduction was built later in the century, and is now located in San Pablo Civic Center, on the northwest corner of San Pablo Avenue and Church Lane. A single beam from the original structure is incorporated into the roof of the replacement structure, at the rear of the adobe facing the interior courtyard.

The first post office was established in 1854. The city incorporated in 1948.

Since the middle of the 20th century, College Center at El Portal has been the backbone of the community's retail economy.

== Geography ==
According to the United States Census Bureau, the city has a total area of 2.6 square miles (6.7 km^{2}), all land.

San Pablo lies on a sedimentary plain between the northern end of the Berkeley Hills and San Pablo Bay, although the city limits do not extend to the bayshore. Two principal creeks traverse the city: Wildcat Creek and San Pablo Creek. Both originate in the mountain ranges to its southeast. The minor Rheem Creek also runs through the city.

The northeastern limits of San Pablo are also traversed by the Hayward Fault, a major branch of the San Andreas Fault, which lies to the west.

Interstate 80 (Eastshore Freeway) passes through San Pablo.

There are several communities to the north of (and separated from) the city, but which have San Pablo mailing addresses. These include the census areas of Tara Hills, Bayview, and Montalvin.

== Economy ==
=== Top employers ===
According to the city's 2023–2024 Annual Comprehensive Financial Report, the top employers in the city are:

#	Employer	# of Employees
1	Contra Costa College	707
2	San Pablo Casino	426
3	West Contra Costa Unified School District	303
4	Las Montana's Supermarket	245
5	Brookside San Pablo Health Center	210
6	Vale Healthcare Center	180
7	West County Health Center	177
8	City of San Pablo	171
9	San Pablo Healthcare and Wellness Center	160
10	Creekside Health Care Center	109

The San Pablo Casino is considered the economic backbone of the city.

== Demographics ==
Historical population
Census	Pop.	Note	%±
1870	1,075		—
1890	367		—
1950	14,476		—
1960	19,687		36.0%
1970	21,461		9.0%
1980	19,750		−8.0%
1990	25,158		27.4%
2000	30,215		20.1%
2010	29,139		−3.6%
2020	32,127		10.3%
U.S. Decennial Census

=== 2020 census ===
As of the 2020 census, San Pablo had a population of 32,127 and a population density of 12,243.5 inhabitants per square mile (4,727.2/km^{2}).

The census reported that 98.7% of the population lived in households, 0.2% lived in non-institutionalized group quarters, and 1.0% were institutionalized. 100.0% of residents lived in urban areas, while 0.0% lived in rural areas.

There were 9,545 households, out of which 44.9% included children under the age of 18, 44.6% were married-couple households, 7.6% were cohabiting couple households, 29.3% had a female householder with no spouse or partner present, and 18.5% had a male householder with no spouse or partner present. About 18.0% of all households were one person, and 7.6% were one person aged 65 or older. The average household size was 3.32. There were 7,231 families (75.8% of all households).

The age distribution was 24.8% under the age of 18, 10.3% aged 18 to 24, 30.1% aged 25 to 44, 23.3% aged 45 to 64, and 11.5% who were 65 years of age or older. The median age was 34.7 years. For every 100 females, there were 99.0 males, and for every 100 females age 18 and over there were 96.9 males age 18 and over.

There were 9,941 housing units, of which 4.0% were vacant. Of the occupied units, 43.1% were owner-occupied and 56.9% were occupied by renters. The homeowner vacancy rate was 0.5% and the rental vacancy rate was 3.2%.

Racial composition as of the 2020 census
Race	Number	Percent
White	4,173	13.0%
Black or African American	4,012	12.5%
American Indian and Alaska Native	722	2.2%
Asian	5,018	15.6%
Native Hawaiian and Other Pacific Islander	145	0.5%
Some other race	13,807	43.0%
Two or more races	4,250	13.2%
Hispanic or Latino (of any race)	19,610	61.0%

=== 2023 ACS estimates ===
In 2023, the US Census Bureau estimated that of those aged 25 or older, 74.2% were high school graduates and 15.0% had a bachelor's degree. The median household income was $78,215, and the per capita income was $29,111.

=== 2010 census ===
Demographic profile	2010
Total Population	29,139 - 100.0%
One Race	27,572 - 94.6%
Not Hispanic or Latino	12,677 - 43.5%
White alone	2,944 - 10.1%
Black or African American alone	4,446 - 15.3%
American Indian and Alaska Native alone	73 - 0.3%
Asian alone	4,281 - 14.7%
Native Hawaiian and Other Pacific Islander alone	156 - 0.5%
Some other race alone	109 - 0.4%
Two or more races alone	668 - 2.3%
Hispanic or Latino (of any race)	16,462 - 56.5%

=== Languages ===
The languages spoken were 42.49% English, 40.3% Spanish, 5.47% Tagalog, 2.8% Vietnamese, 2.52% Miao-Mien, 1.95% Laotian, 1.18% Punjabi, 0.92% Portuguese, 0.75% Chinese, 0.57% Hindi, and 0.95% other languages spoken by less than 0.5% of the population each.

== Politics ==
According to the California Secretary of State, as of February 10, 2019, San Pablo has 11,121 registered voters. Of those, 6,756 (60.7%) are registered Democrats, 626 (5.6%) are registered Republicans, and 3,281 (29.5%) have declined to state a political party.

== Transportation ==
The community is served by AC Transit buses that connect it with Hilltop Mall Shopping Center, Richmond Parkway Transit Center, and Richmond BART and Amtrak station in Richmond and El Cerrito del Norte BART in El Cerrito. This is in addition to services around San Pablo and to El Sobrante. There is transbay service directly to the San Francisco Transbay Terminal. There is owl service to Richmond, Pinole, and El Cerrito. AC also provides school service to high and middle schools of the West Contra Costa Unified School District. WestCat provides a link between Contra Costa College and Hercules Transit Center along San Pablo Avenue, a major north–south arterial boulevard. San Pablo Avenue is home to a BRT line, the 72R, that connects the college with Downtown Oakland and BART. The college services as a major transit hub for buses and the city. Interstate 80 flanks the eastern boundary of the city.

== Education ==
The city hosts the county's western campus of the Contra Costa Community College District. This school is named Contra Costa College and is part of the California community college system.

The city also hosts a variety of primary and secondary education schools, such as Tara Hills Elementary School, Downer Elementary School, Highland Elementary School, Dover Elementary School, and Middle College High School.

The San Pablo Library of the Contra Costa County Library system is located at the corner of Church Street and San Pablo Avenue, having relocated there in 2017.

== Notable people ==
- Gene Clines, former Major League Baseball outfielder, was born in San Pablo
- Gary Holt, guitarist for metal bands Slayer and Exodus
- Eric the Actor, former caller and actor for Howard Stern's radio show, was born in San Pablo

== Sister cities ==
- Manzanillo, Mexico

== Notes ==
- U.S. Geological Survey Geographic Names Information System: San Pablo, California
