= Hoffman Marsh =

Wetland in Richmond, California

- Location within California
- Location: Richmond, California, United States
- Coordinates: 37°54′19″N 122°19′11″W
- Type: Wetland
- Part of: San Francisco Bay
- Primary inflows: Fluvius Innominatus
- Primary outflows: Hoffman Channel

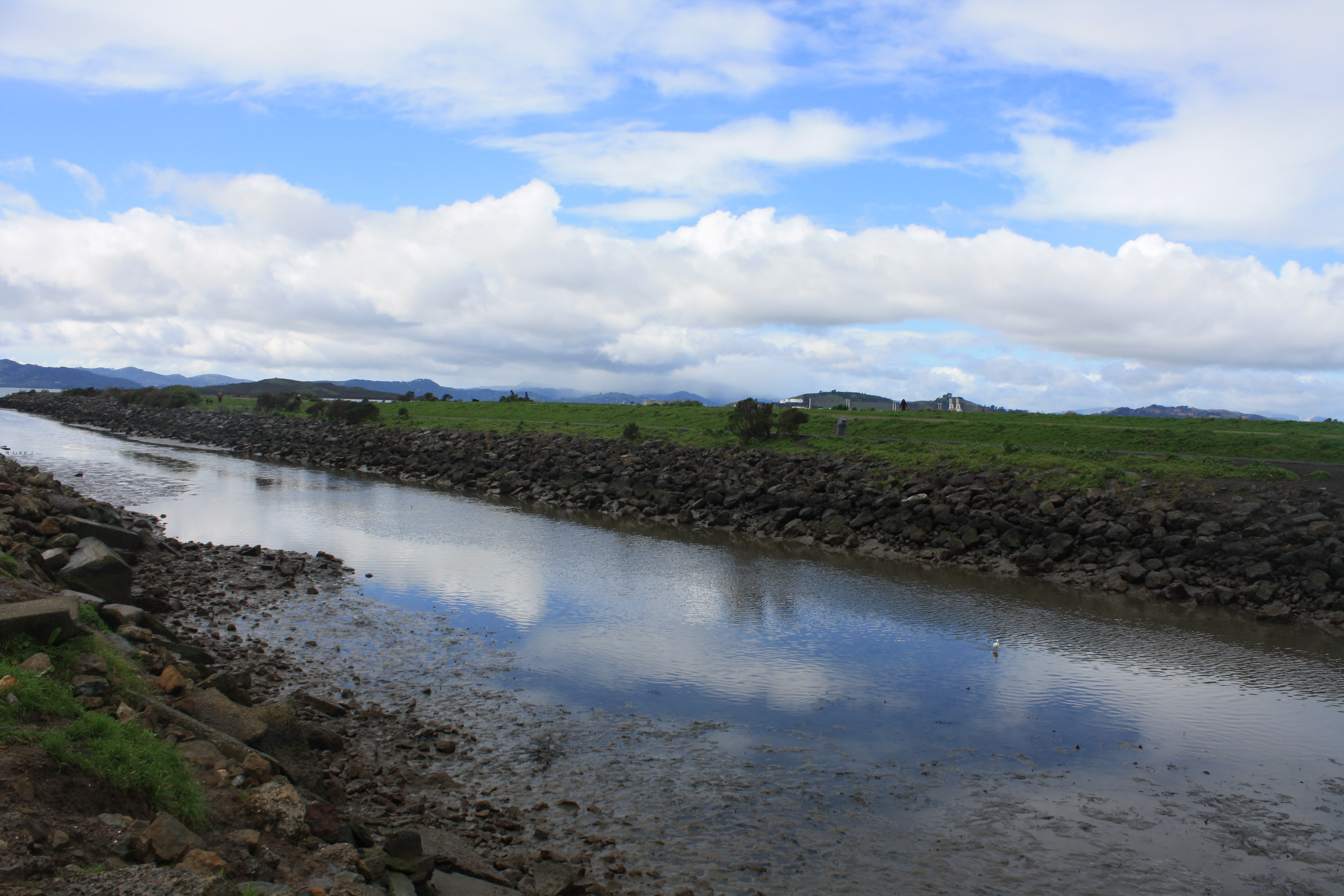
The Point Isabel's Hoffman Channel at Low Tide

Hoffman Marsh is a wetlands on San Francisco Bay in Richmond, California. The marsh has been protected within Eastshore State Park, and adjacent to Point Isabel Regional Shoreline. The marsh is an important nesting ground for wildfowl and stopping ground on the Pacific Flyway, as it is one of only a handful of undestroyed wetlands in the Bay Area. It borders Point Isabel Regional Shoreline and Interstate 80.

== Hoffman Channel ==
Hoffman Marsh is the delta for the mouth of Fluvius Innominatus creek into the Hoffman Channel, which leads to San Francisco Bay. Hoffman Channel is a constructed channel that runs between Point Isabel Regional Shoreline and North Point Isabel, both of which are landfill. The park allows dogs to be off leash when accompanied by their owners, and serves a swimming area for these animals. The marsh is bounded on the west by the San Francisco Bay Trail, which runs along a berm built by Santa Fe Railroad. After the berm was built, Hoffman Marsh developed behind it. Hoffman Channel is adjacent to Point Isabel promontory and was formerly a sandy beach on its south shore.

== Development proposal ==
There was a proposal to add a 98,000 sq. ft. (9,100 m^{2}) Kohl's department store on a site between the Costco store and the marsh. Many residents were worried about potential negative effects on increased nighttime lighting that will make endangered birds such as the California clapper rail and salt marsh harvest mouse more susceptible to predators. This is in addition to other birds that make overnight stopovers at the marsh that would also possibly decrease in number and therefore reduce biodiversity. The Richmond Annex Neighborhood Council officially opposed the project.

== Park ==
Hoffman Marsh was saved from development, to be protected within Eastshore State Park. Habitat restoration plans are being developed.

== See also ==
- Parks in Richmond, California
- Point Isabel (promontory)
