= Fluvius Innominatus =

Stream in the U.S. state of California

Coordinates: 37.90584°N 122.31925°W

Fluvius Innominatus (Latin for "unnamed river") or Central Creek is a stream in Richmond and El Cerrito, California, in western Contra Costa County. There is one main source and a secondary unnamed tributary. The creek drains into Hoffman Marsh and then flows into the bay through Point Isabel Regional Shoreline's Hoffman Channel. However, before the area was developed and as early as 1899 the creek had as many as 11 sources which stretched far higher into the Berkeley Hills.

== See also ==
- List of watercourses in the San Francisco Bay Area
