= Francisco María Castro =

Don Francisco María Castro (1770–1831), nicknamed El Curioso, was a Californio landowner in an area of Alta California which later became part of Contra Costa County, California.

== Biography ==
Francisco María Castro was the third son of Maria Marina Botiller (c. 1734 – 1813), and Joaquin Ysidro de Castro (c. 1732 – 1801), one of the founding settlers of the Pueblo of San José. He had come as a boy with his family to California from elsewhere in New Spain with the De Anza Expedition in 1775. His brother José Mariano Castro (1765–1828) was the grantee of Rancho Las Animas; his brother Carlos Antonio Castro (1775–??) was the grantee of Rancho San Francisco de las Llagas; and his brother José Joaquín Castro (1768–1838) was the grantee of Rancho San Andrés.

Castro was a corporal in the artillery company of Presidio of San Francisco. He married María Gabriela Berreyesa (1780–1851) of the Berreyesa family on February 16, 1795. The two made their home in San José and produced thirteen offspring between 1796 and 1824. After serving as alcalde and in other public offices, Castro was granted Rancho San Pablo in 1823 by Governor Luís Antonio Argüello. The land had previously been used for grazing cattle belonging to the Mission San Francisco de Asís, but was secularized by the new Mexican republic. He and his family moved to the rancho after 1824.

He died on December 21, 1831, at San Pablo, California. His sons Víctor Castro and Juan José Castro were the grantees of Rancho El Sobrante in 1841. Castro Street, Castro Creek, the Castro Rocks, Castro Point, Castro Cove and Castro Ranch Road in Richmond are named after his family.
