= Point Isabel Regional Shoreline =

Multi-use park in Richmond, California

Coordinates: 37.8990°N 122.3243°W

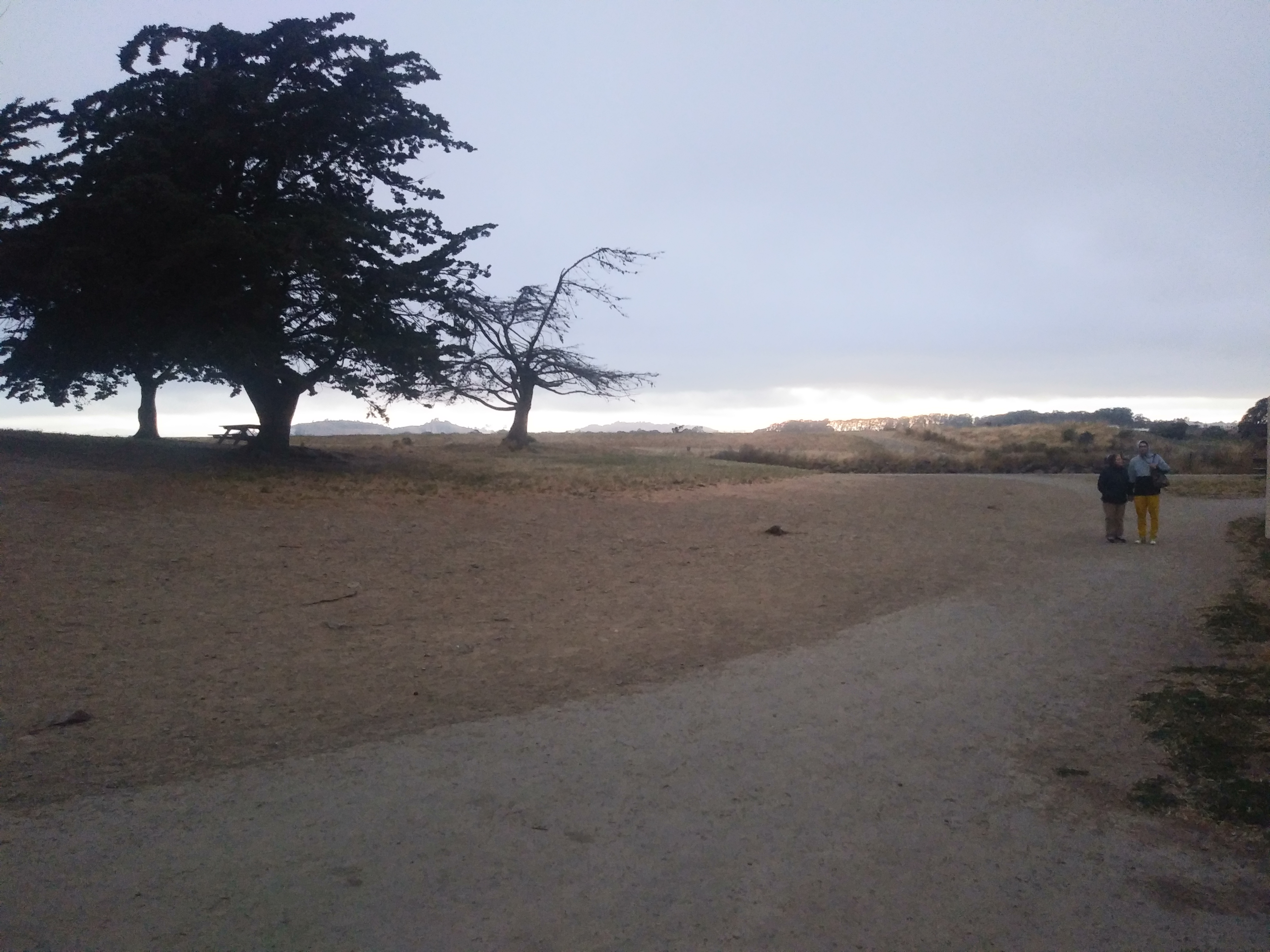
- A map of the park and surrounding area, the land across the channel is known as North Point Isabel
- Interactive map of Point Isabel Regional Shoreline
- Type: Regional (East Bay Regional Park District)
- Location: Richmond, California
- Area: 50 acres (20 ha)
- Created: 1975
- Visitors: 1,400,000 people annually
- Status: Open all year

Point Isabel Regional Shoreline in Richmond, California, is operated by East Bay Regional Park District, and is a multi-use park for joggers, windsurfers, kayakers, photographers, picnickers, and people walking dogs. It has access for pedestrians and via public transit, private vehicles, and bikes (although bike-riding within Point Isabel itself is not allowed). It also features a concession offering food for people and grooming for pets. A longtime community organization and nonprofit, Point Isabel Dog Owners and Friends (PIDO), is active in the maintenance and improvement of the park.

== History ==
This now 50-acre (200,000 m^{2}) park was incorporated into the East Bay Regional Park District (EBRPD) in 1975. The United States Postal Service operates a large bulk mail facility adjacent to what is now Point Isabel Regional Shoreline. As mitigation for the construction of this large facility on the shoreline, USPS offered to lease what is now Point Isabel Regional Shoreline free of charge to the EBRPD until 2025. The lease came with the condition of free public access.

Point Isabel was acquired by the East Bay Regional Park District (EBPRD) in 1975 from the United States Postal Service (USPS). The EBRPD entered a 50-year lease agreement with the US Postal Service as mitigation for the bulk-mail center that was being built adjacent to the land that would become Point Isabel Regional Shoreline. The lease ended in October of 2025 but the park is continuing to operate and remains accessible to the public free of charge.

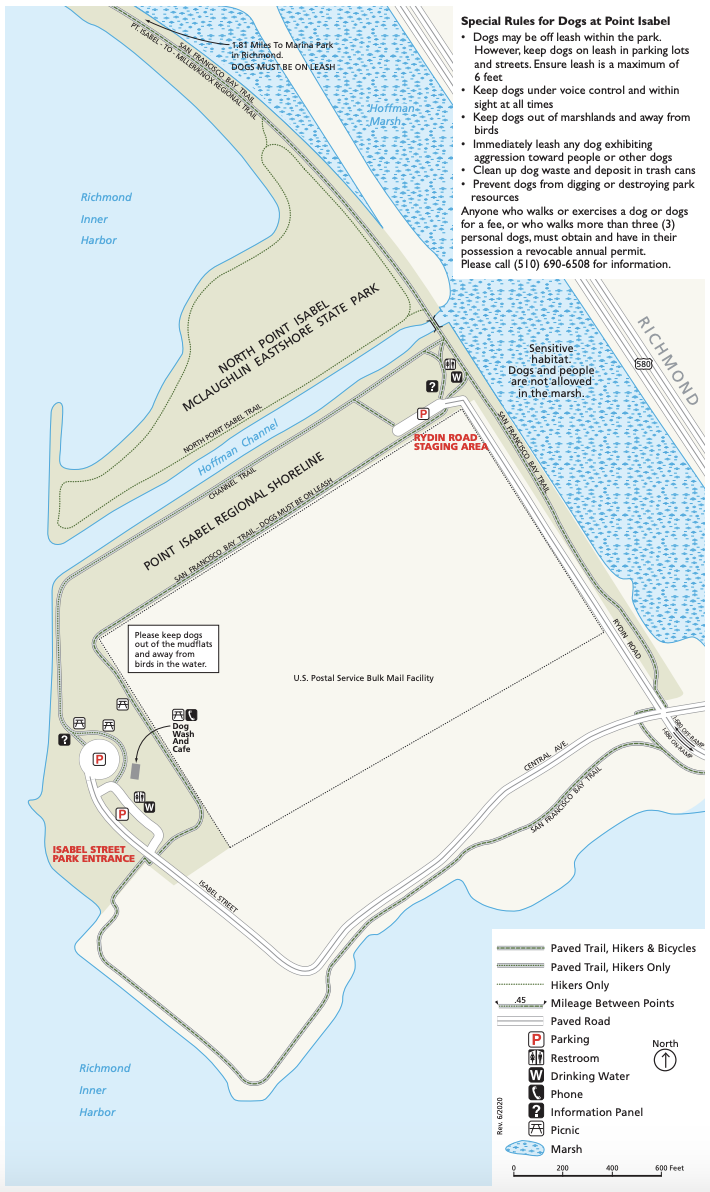
Map of Point Isabel Regional Shoreline Park

Originally 23 acres, Point Isabel gained an additional 20 acres of land located across the Hoffman Channel - called North Point Isabel (also referenced as Battery Point). These additional 20 acres were acquired in 2002 when McLaughlin Eastshore State Park (then Eastshore State Park) was created. North Point Isabel can be accessed from Point Isabel via a short footbridge or from the Bay Trail. There are also more than 2.5 miles of San Francisco Bay Trail in the vicinity of the park.

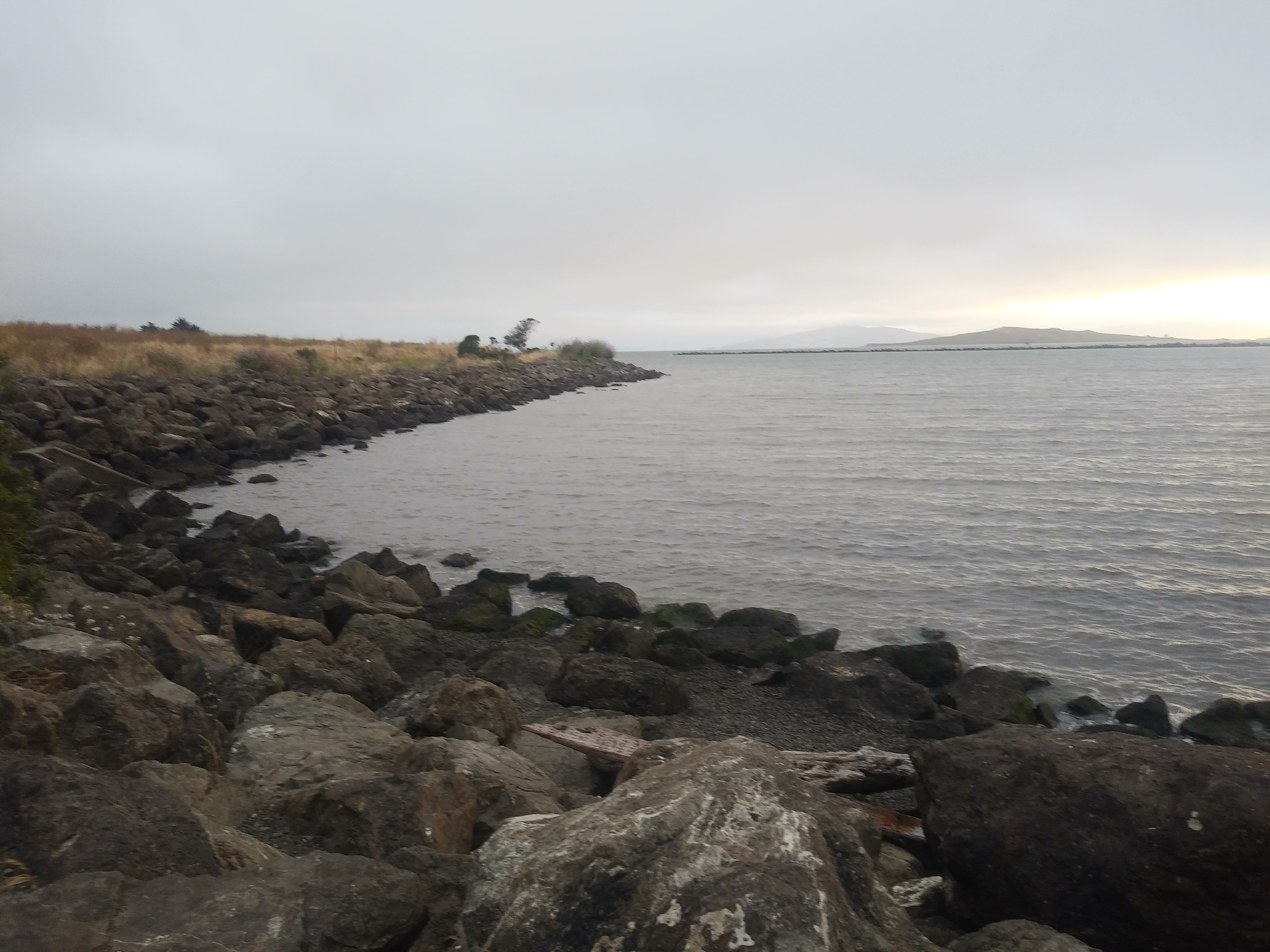
The park's shoreline in 2019

Both Point Isabel and North Point Isabel, like many parks along the East Bay shoreline, are landfill. For years North Point Isabel was a dumping ground for industrial waste during the 1950s and 1960s. The land received the moniker Battery Point due to the large quantities of battery casings that were buried there under the control of the Santa Fe Land Improvement Company. Prior, lead from ammunition and explosives had been accumulating since the 1850s when it was a popular spot for bird hunting. In the 1900s, there was a dynamite factory that operated at Point Isabel as well. Upon the closure of the factory, it was used as target practice for a rifle club from the late 1930s to the late 1950s. In 1980 the California Department of Fish and Game found widespread contamination at Point Isabel and Santa Fe Land Improvement was ordered to do a massive clean up by the San Francisco Bay Water Control Board and the Contra Costa County Department of Health Services. Beginning in 1985, the cleanup took 14 months as the company removed battery casings, contaminated soil, and implemented infrastructure that would both prevent lead from leaching into the bay and monitor the site’s groundwater levels. They also brought in specially prepared soil to create a cap over the landfill, and installed rocks to prevent shoreline erosion.

The fenced-off area just north of the public restrooms at the Rydin Road end of the park is dirt that was dug more recently when the restrooms were installed. The dirt pile tested positive for high levels of contaminants and was fenced off, planted, and is permanently off-limits. Other small areas of North Point Isabel have been fenced off either because they tested positive for lead or zinc or to prevent further erosion of the clay cap and edges of the landfill.

In 2008 Richmond’s Planning Commission voted to rezone Point Isabel in order to accommodate a Kohl’s department store and 400 additional parking spots. The year prior, in 20017, Kohl’s leased property at Point Isabel with plans to open a 99,011 square foot department store. The land was zoned as light industrial which minimizes the impact on adjacent wildlife habitats such as the Hoffmann canal and the Richmond-Albany mudflats. In order to build the store, Richmond needed to zone the area for commercial development which much of the community was against as they wanted to preserve the shoreline while minimizing the industrial footprint. In February 2008 Kohl’s dropped out, citing economic reasons. Five months later, the city of Richmond issued a draft general plan to rezone most of Point Isabel as regional commercial mixed use. This would allow companies such as Kohl’s to build without public hearing.

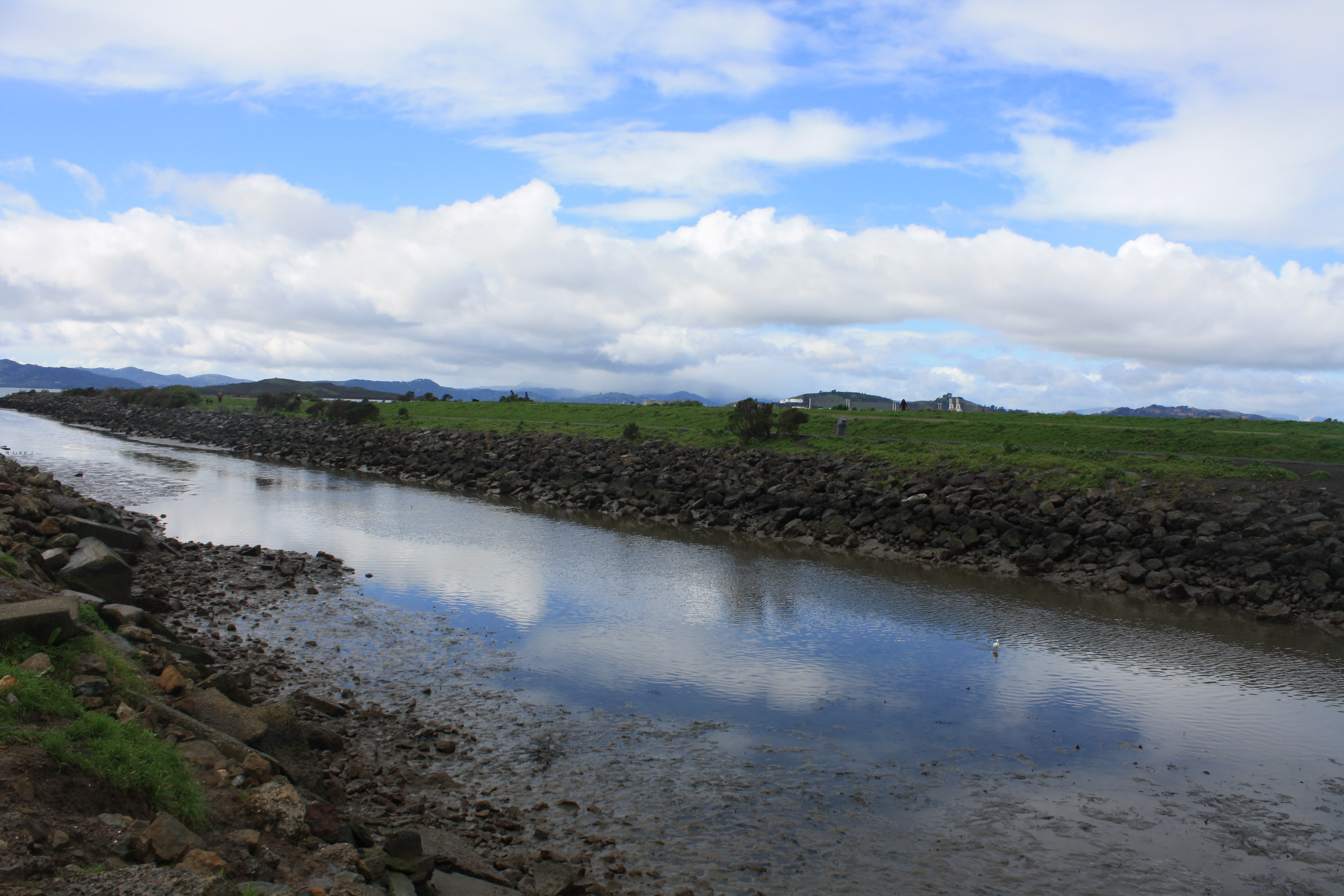
Point Isabel's Hoffman Channel at Low Tide

The park has seen many improvements over the years, including the building of permanent buildings for the Mudpuppy's Tub & Scrub dog wash and adjacent Sit & Stay Café; permanent bathrooms on both ends of the park (Isabel Street and Rydin Road); trail repaving on the Point Isabel side; and parking lot repaving and restriping. The bridge across the Hoffman Channel was reinforced in 2019 to ensure it could hold emergency vehicles on the adjacent Bay Trail (along the Hoffman Marsh). The informal launching area for nonmotorized watercraft (primarily windsurfers and kayaks) was significantly improved around 2018, including shoring up the edges of the landfill, installing a pea gravel area for windsurfers to stage their equipment, a broad, concrete ramp to the water's edge, and paved sidewalks out to the launch area.

Park usage has increased exponentially from an estimated 500,000 human visitors in 2000 to some 1,500,000 by the early 2020s, according to EBRPD estimates. It is used heavily by people walking dogs but also by walkers, joggers, windsurfers, kayakers, photographers, birdwatchers, and picnickers. A few years ago it underwent some US $500,000 worth of capital improvements, including new irrigation systems and turf, foxtail removal, trail repavement, picnic sites and café seating. That was funded by a portion of US $225 million collected by Measure AA (1998)

Point Isabel regularly makes the list of the top best places in the U.S. to walk dogs off-leash. It was named the number one dog park by People for the Ethical Treatment of Animals (PETA) in 2006.

It is named for the natural promontory of Point Isabel, which was itself named for landowner Don Víctor Castro's daughter Isabel. The Castros operated Rancho San Pablo, with an adobe home that stood where El Cerrito Plaza is today. From their dock at Point Isabel they ferried cattle, hides, and beef to Mission Dolores and then to booming San Francisco during and after the Gold Rush. Between 1951 and 1959, the original hilly peninsula was leveled by Santa Fe Railway to make way for the Stege sewage plant (now EBMUD's stormwater treatment plant) and a business park. For many years an El Cerrito crockery company, TEPCO, dumped its seconds and shards along the shoreline near the sewage treatment plant. Shards of broken pottery are still frequently found along the western shoreline.

The remains of Laci Peterson washed up at Point Isabel in 2003, and those of her unborn son, Connor, were found a short distance north along the shoreline.

== Environmental concerns ==
A portion of Point Isabel, locally known as TEPCO beach, is covered in thousands of pieces of broken ceramic dishware. The Technical Porcelain and Chinaware Company (TEPCO) was founded in 1918 and grew substantially until the death of its founder, John Pagliero, in 1968. During the span of these fifty years, TEPCO discarded their broken dishware along the banks of Point Isabel.

Point Isabel served as a dumping ground for lead-filled battery casings, thus creating toxic emissions from within the soil. Thousands of tons of soil was removed from this site in the 1970s and 1980s, which was supposed to have resolved the issue. However, in 2018, lead leaks have proved that the job was not entirely completed in the 1970s and 1980s. The source of the recent lead leaks has not been discovered.

TEPCO factories “churned out 30,000 pieces every day” to create the beach full of porcelain and pottery shards. According to Dave Weinstein, the president of the El Cerrito Historical Society, the managers of the land “encouraged all kinds of people to come and dump whatever they wanted to make land” for the area, which TEPCO contributed greatly to by dumping all the dishware. In a way, creating the land with otherwise landfill-bound dishware is a form of reusing. However, the environmental concerns of this TEPCO dump site remain a problem for locals. According to Schwartz with KQED, Point Isabel used to be a hill with trees. Only when the former owner of the land, Santa Fe Railroad, decided to fill in the “part of the bay near Point Isabel to build an industrial park,” it became a dumping ground. In fact, nobody was bothered by the dumping until the late 1960s, when the environmental organization Save the Bay started fighting to stop the “amount of infill going on around the Bay.” Because of the remaining prevalence of the dishware, Point Isabel remains a location of contention for environmentalists.

== Overview ==
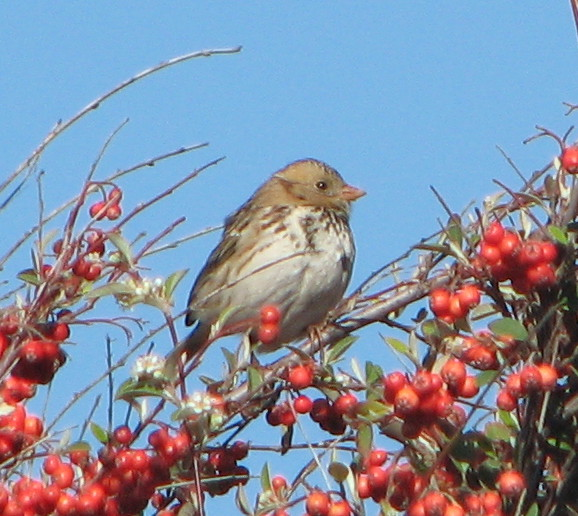
A Harris's sparrow at the point.

The park is located along the eastern shore of the San Francisco Bay in the East Bay region of the Bay Area and is administered by East Bay Regional Park District. The park consists of two halves of roughly equal size—Point Isabel and North Point Isabel—separated by the narrow Hoffman Channel. Hoffman Channel is the outlet of Fluvius Innominatus creek from its mouth at the edge of its delta, Hoffman Marsh The shoreline of the entire park is lined with boulders, broken concrete blocks, and other riprap.

The northern shore of the park against Hoffman Channel was formerly a sandy beach and has been modified from its original state by leveling and in-filling of the surrounding mudflats, tidal flats and other wetlands. The rest of the peninsula consists of the Bay Trail, a water treatment facility, radio towers, a US Postal Service facility, a Costco store, and office buildings. The parkland has an elevation of 16–25 feet (5–8 meters).

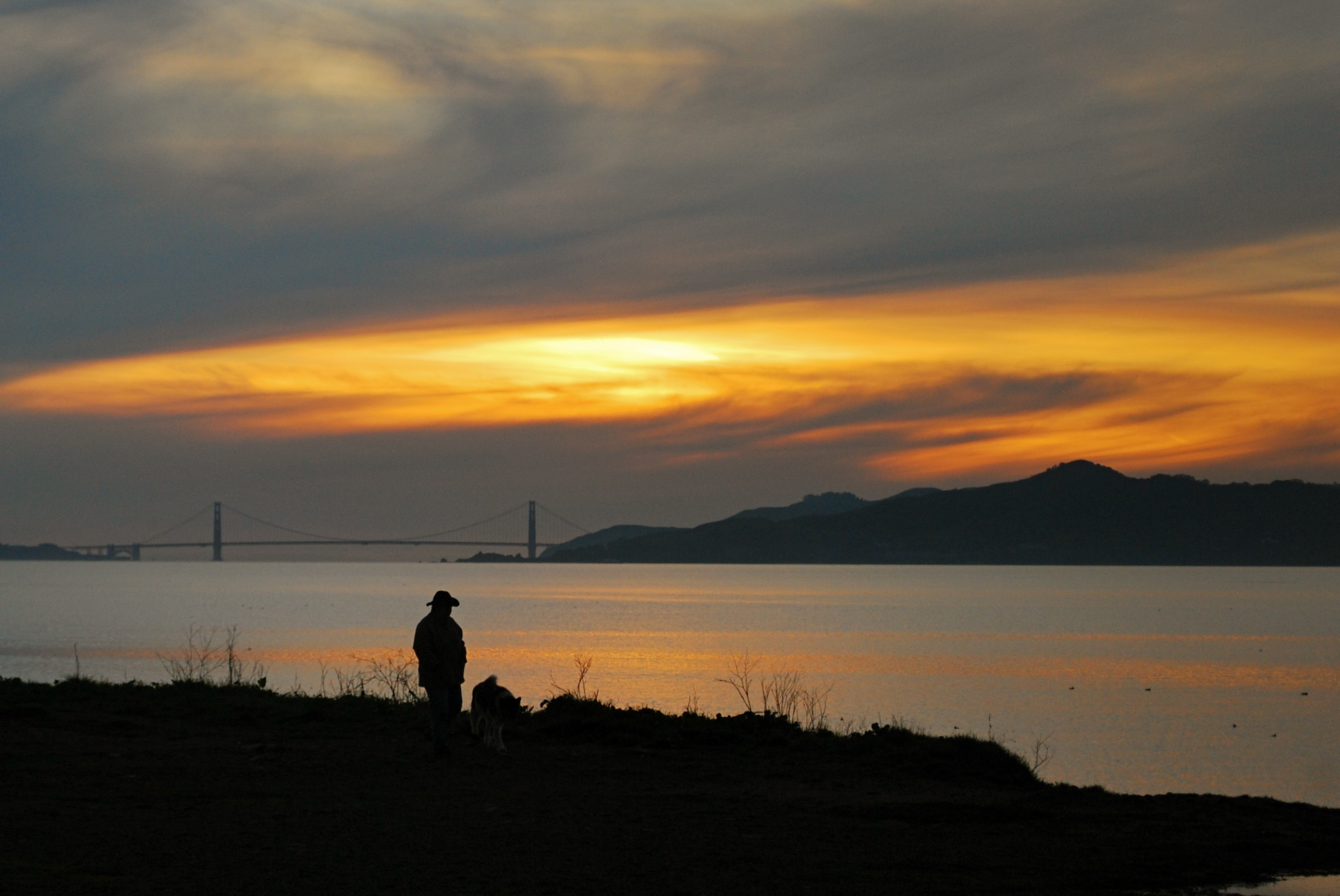
Golden Gate Bridge Seen From Point Isabel at Sunset

The park is open between 5 am and 10 pm PST; admission and parking are free, as stipulated by the lease agreement. The park is wheelchair accessible although the path around the perimeter of North Point Isabel is rough.

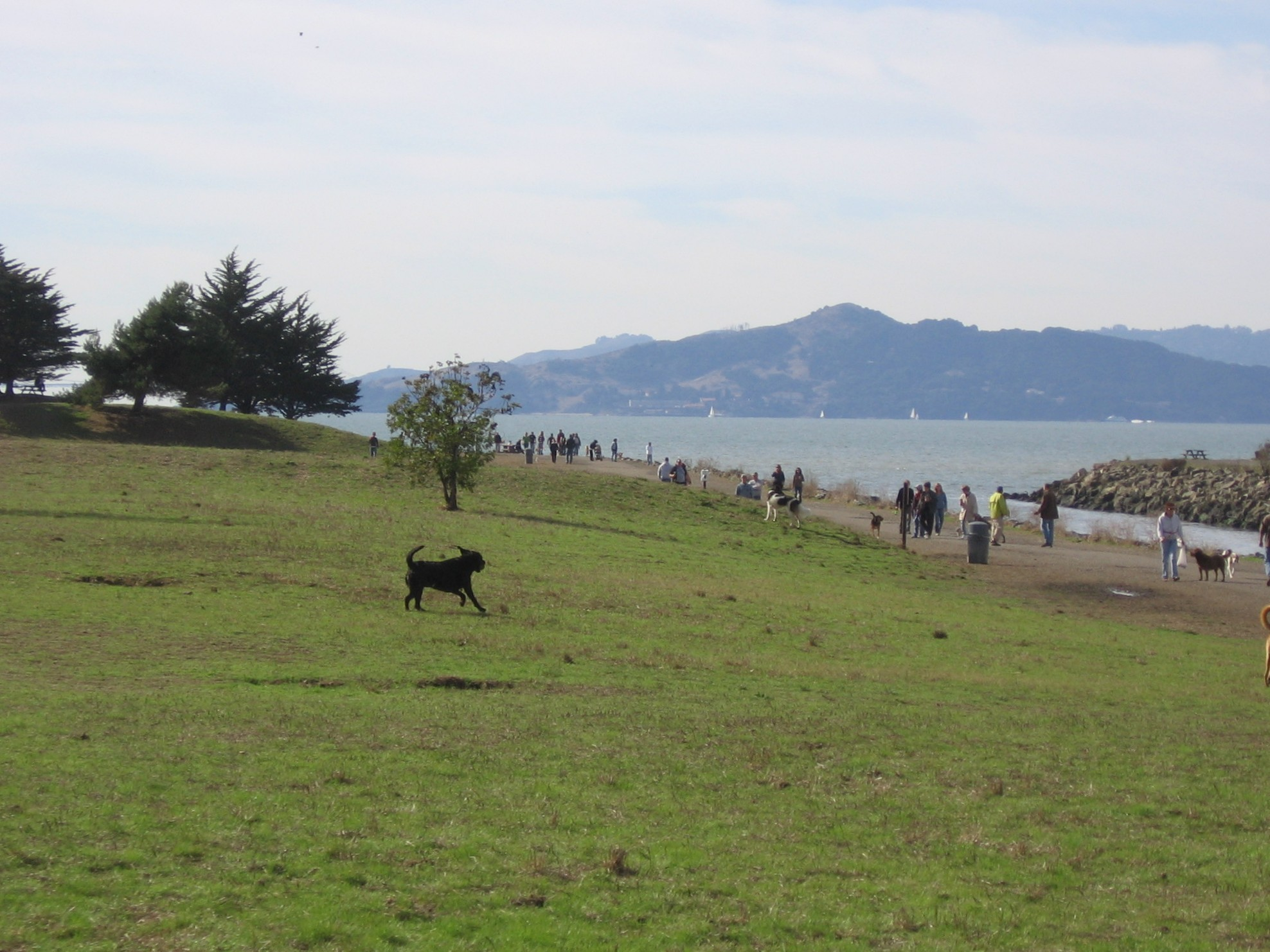
The park on a November day with Angel Island and Marin County in the background.

Point Isabel features two concessions: Mudpuppy's Tub and Scrub, which is a dog grooming retail store and outlet, and the Sit & Stay Café, which offers hot and cold drinks and light food.

The park offers striking panoramic views of Marin County, San Francisco, the Golden Gate Bridge, and the Bay Bridge. The 3.2 miles (5.1 km) of flat trails are generally wheelchair accessible and stroller friendly on the south side of the footbridge. The trails on North Point Isabel are dirt or gravel/old asphalt. The San Francisco Bay Trail wraps around Point Isabel Regional Shoreline.

The park supplies bags for picking up animal waste. These bags cost the EBRPD about US$34,000 annually, to which the Point Isabel Dog Owners group contributes.

Beginning in early 2027, the park is scheduled to be partially closed for a project that is striving to make the shoreline park more environmentally sustainable and accessible. According to current plans, the north section of the park will be closed for anywhere from 6 to 24 months. The EBRPD’s North Point Isabel Cap Resilience Project wants to add elevation to protect the park from sea level rise as well as to mitigate pollution that has resulted from past toxic dumping. The plan includes creating channels and introducing native plants to reduce soil erosion as well as filtering sediment from stormwater before it enters the bay. In addition, they want to install a new trail network. The project originated from a request by the SF Regional Water Quality Board to improve the water quality in the SF bay as a whole - as Point Isabel Regional Shoreline surrounds the Hoffman Channel that flows into the SF Bay, the project also includes Point Isabel.

The project has received praise from frequenters of the park, but there are also those with reservations about proposed fencing that will keep dogs away from the mudflats. Dog walkers at Point Isabel believe the future of off leash walking is dependent on the mitigation project because it is challenging to have dogs off leash and heavy equipment operating simultaneously. It is not just the public who have strong opinions about this project - within PIDO (Point Isabel Dog Owners is a local non-profit working to maintain the space) there is disagreement over the installation of permanent fencing that would prohibit water access along the North Point area of the park to prevent dogs from disturbing the mudflats and shorebirds that use them. The Hoffman Channel that runs between the north and south sides, however, will only be fenced off on one side and remain accessible to dogs. Point Isabel is recognized by many as a special place because it is one of few parks in the district where dogs are able to run off leash. It is also praised for the incredible views of San Francisco, the Golden Gate Bridge, Marin, the marshlands, and the birds. There are users of the park who are fearful that the installation of fences will disturb and impact the aspects of the park that make the space special for them.

Organisms

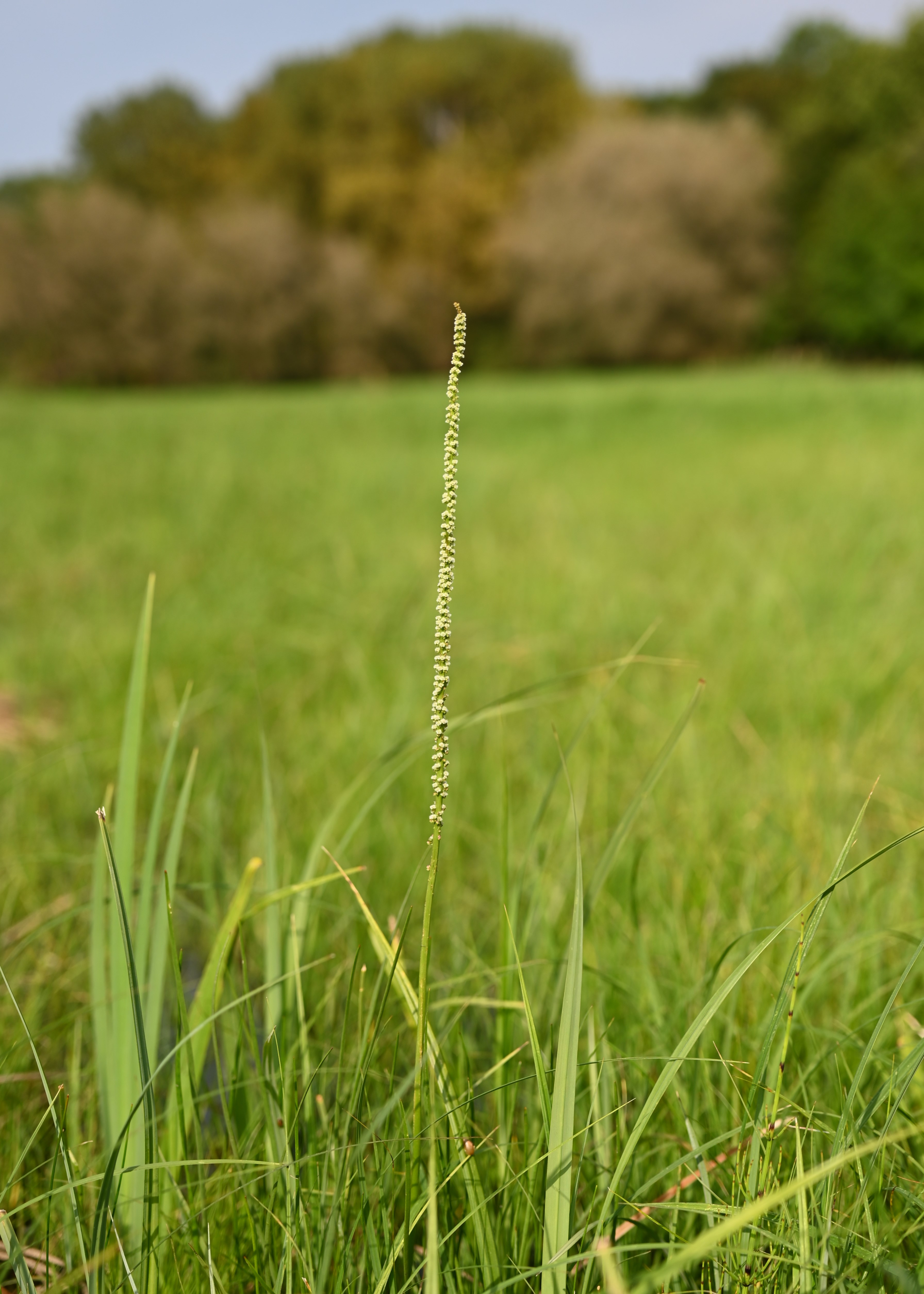
^{Common Arrow Grass (Triglochin Maritima)}

Point Isabel is home to more than 2,000 native and naturalized species. The larger portion of the park is covered by Common Arrow Grass (Triglochin Maritima), Wild Oat (Avena Fatua), and Hairy Pampas Grass (Cortaderia Jubata). The grounds are also sprinkled with colorful flowers like the California Poppy (Escscholzia Californica), Bull Thistle (Cirsium Vulgare), Perennial Sweet Peas (Lathyrus Latifolious), and Greater Periwinkle (Vinca major).

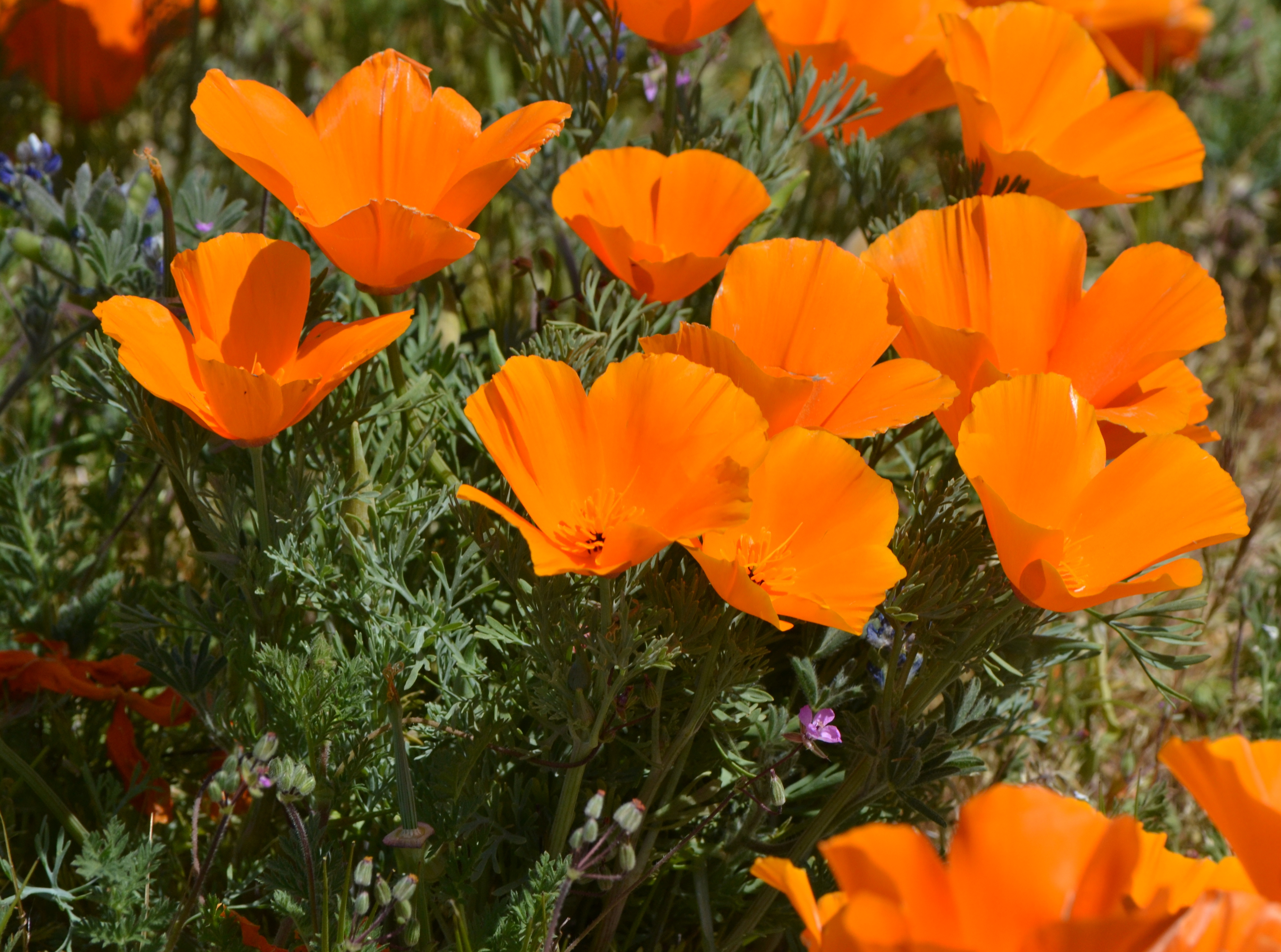
^{California Poppy (Escscholzia Californica)}

Point Isabel is also known to be an overwintering sight for monarch butterflies. During the winter months, the monarch butterflies cluster together in coastal forests, often eucalyptus trees, Monterey cypress, or Monterey pine trees to stay warm.

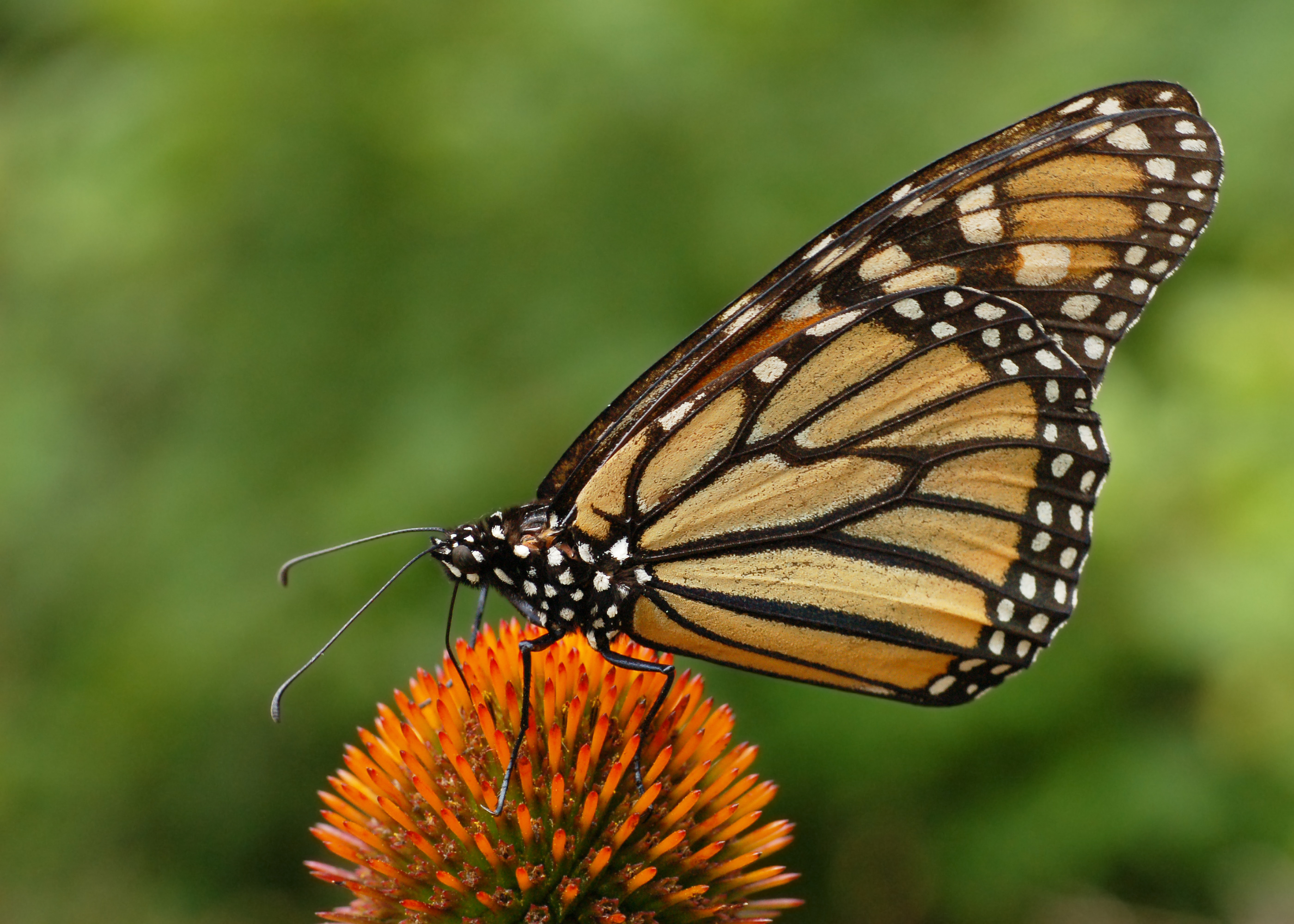
Monarch Butterfly

=== Park rules ===
The park is open from 5:00 a.m. to 10:00 p.m. every day unless otherwise posted. Bicycling is not allowed inside Point Isabel Regional Shoreline, but bikes can loop around the fenced park on a spur of the Bay Trail. Leashes are optional for dogs throughout the park but dogs must be leashed in the parking lots Dog walkers are limited to three dogs each (although EBRPD issues permits for individuals and professionals to walk up to six dogs apiece). Visitors with dogs must carry a leash for each dog; must clean up their pets' waste; must prevent their dogs from digging; and must immediately fill any holes dug by their pets. Dogs who become aggressive must be leashed immediately. Dogs are allowed to swim in the Bay, in Hoffman Channel at high tide, and in Hoffman Bay (the northern edge of North Point Isabel) at high tide. Dogs may not harass birds at any time; are never allowed in Hoffman Marsh (on the other side of the Bay Trail from Point Isabel); and must not disturb birds feeding in the Hoffman Bay mudflats or Hoffman Channel at low tide.

== Transportation ==
The park was served by AC Transit's 25 bus line, which linked it to the El Cerrito Plaza BART station and Downtown Berkeley. The park is also accessible by car via I-80 and I-580 from the Central Avenue exit. There is parking in two parking lots and additional street parking. Car break-ins have been an issue at both parking lots. There are bike racks on the Isabel Street end of the park.

The park connects to the San Francisco Bay Trail leading north to the Marina Bay neighborhood in Richmond and south toward Albany, Berkeley and Emeryville.

== PIDO ==
Point Isabel Dog Owners and Friends (PIDO) is a 501(c)(3) nonprofit organization with approximately 7,500 members as of 2024. It is all-volunteer. It was founded in 1985 when Point Isabel was made on-leash-only and by 1987 successfully negotiated off-leash, multi-use status for Point Isabel again. PIDO has worked since then to raise funds for poop bags and park maintenance, educate park users, and help keep the park clean, safe, and off-leash. (Point Isabel has been noted in the media for its safety, lack of vandalism, and cleanliness.) When off-leash access to North Point Isabel was in jeopardy during the creation of what is now McLaughlin Eastshore State Park in 2002, PIDO collected 20,000 signatures to preserve multi-use recreation. When the City of Richmond planned to rezone the Point Isabel promontory in 2008 to allow a Kohl's department store and fast-food restaurants, PIDO joined forces with neighborhood groups and environmentalists to preserve and protect the area.

As park usage has grown exponentially over the years, PIDO has remained an important voice for off-leash recreation at Point Isabel although an ever-smaller percentage of total visitors. (There may be as many as 1.5 million park user visits to Point Isabel each year, according to EBRPD estimates. The largest Facebook group dedicated to recreation at Point Isabel, Point Isabel Friends, has nearly 4,000 members.)

PIDO sends an annual contribution to EBRPD every year to help fund poop bags. It maintains two bulletin boards at the park. It sponsors occasional Canine Good Citizen testing and accreditation for dogs; holds regular park cleaning and weed-pulling events; occasional Off-leash Skills 101 one-off sessions with a professional trainer (free but spaces are limited); and a popular dog costume contest and parade called "Barktoberfest" around Halloween. It educates park-goers via a periodic e-newsletter; its bulletin boards; and The PIDO Pointer, a newsletter published three times a year and mailed or e-mailed to members as well as being available online and free on the bulletin boards at Point Isabel.

PIDO is supported almost entirely by lifetime membership fees and charitable donations, which cover or even exceed its costs. In recent years, PIDO appears to have struggled to recruit and retain board members and volunteers.

PIDO has been an important voice in support of off-leash recreation around the Bay Area, lending its support to causes from Golden Gate National Recreation Area to Cesar Chavez Park in Berkeley. In recent years it has shifted away from activism toward more traditional "dog club" activities such as events and dog training.

See also

- Point Isabel, the promontory on which the park is situated.
