= Point Isabel (promontory) =

Promontory on San Francisco Bay

Coordinates: 37.897°N 122.324°W

Point Isabel is a promontory on the eastern shore of San Francisco Bay in the Richmond Annex neighborhood of Richmond, United States.

== History ==
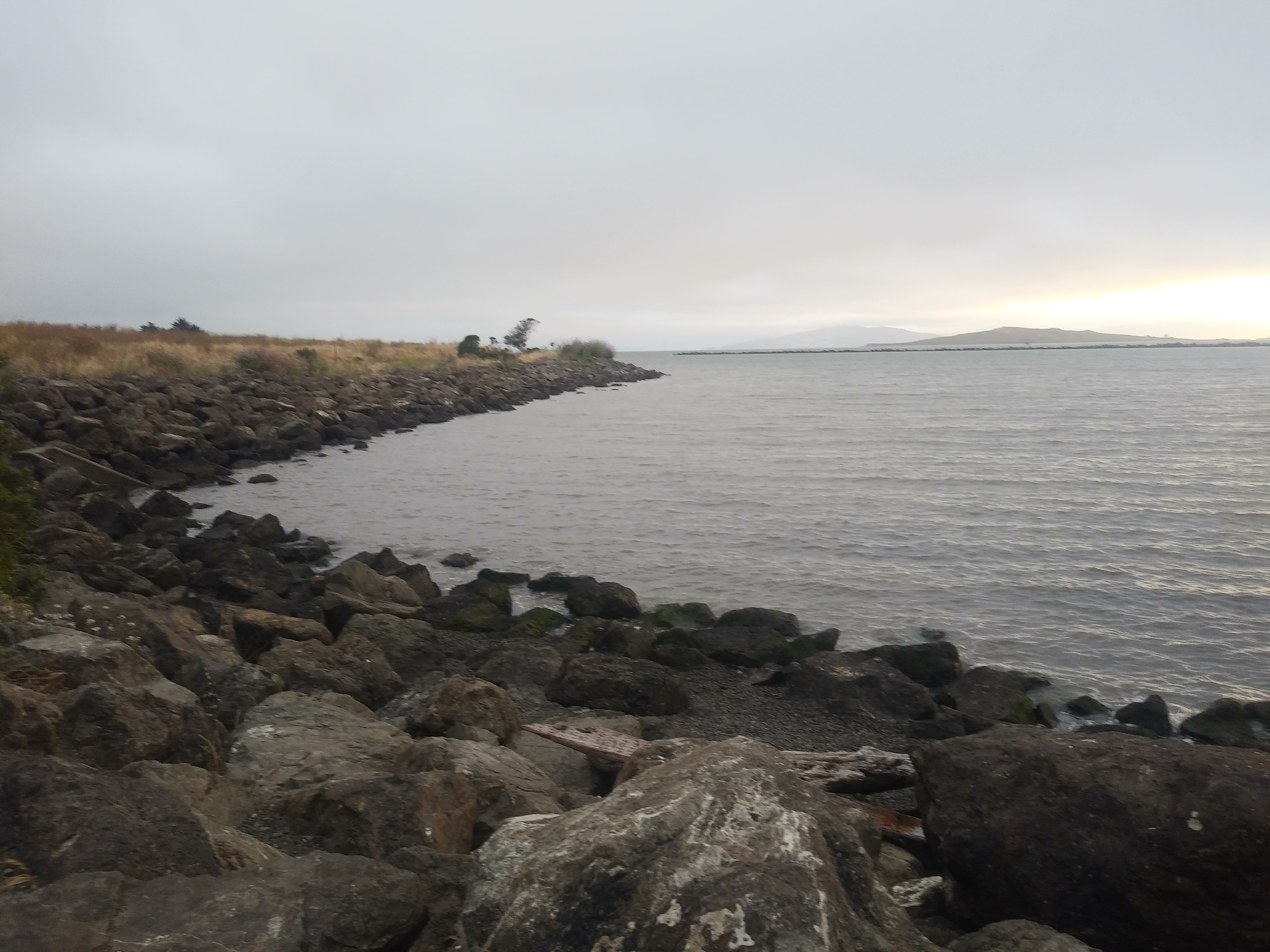
Point Isabel Shoreline

Point Isabel is a hilltop in the ancient range of hills that also includes Albany Hill, Brooks Island, and the Potrero San Pablo. Rising sea levels following the last Ice Age formed San Francisco Bay and left the point as a rocky promontory joined to the mainland by a salt marsh that flooded at high tides. A large shell midden showed that Native Americans used the site, specifically the Huchiun Indians.

In the 19th Century, Point Isabel was part of the Rancho San Pablo owned by Don Victór Castro whose father received it in a land grant from the Mexican Republic. Victor Castro named the point for his daughter Isabel. He used it as a landing for boats shipping grain and other articles across the Bay. Castro also built a landing, slaughterhouse, and a hotel on this site. After the United States took control of California, Castro was forced to sell much of his land. Minna Quilfeldt purchased 500 acres around this land in the 1850s. Her husband, Richard Stege, used the land to raise bullfrogs and develop a resort. In later years, the land was acquired by the Du Pont subsidiary Vigoret Powder Works of San Francisco, which used it primarily to store explosives. A wharf and railroad spur served the Vigoret site.

In the early 20th century, "training walls" were built in this area in order to keep channels open, which resulted in a marsh developing behind these walls. This provided habitats for shorebirds and waterbirds. Around the same time, Stauffer Chemical began making sulfuric acid in the area. This site continued its manufacturing until 1997. Chemicals exposed in this area include arsenic, lead, mercury, benzene, acetone, PCBs, mercury, and many others. In the 1930s, the San Pablo Avenue Sportsmen’s Club used Point Isabel for fishing and duck hunting. During World War II, the Navy used Point Isabel as a shooting range.

The original hilltop, significantly higher than the present elevation, was dynamited for development in the 1950s. The rubble was used to fill marshlands, widening the point and connecting it to the mainland. A dump for industrial waste filled tidelands north of the original point, separated from it by a tidal channel draining Hoffmann Marsh. This area became known as "Battery Point" because of the large number of batteries buried there. Industrial uses from pesticide manufacturing to waste oil recycling, as well as a pistol range, left the land north and east of Point Isabel among the most polluted brownfield sites along San Francisco Bay, although some of these have been remediated. In recent years, part of the original point, Hoffman Marsh to the east, and later Battery Point were acquired by the East Bay Regional Parks District for its Point Isabel Regional Shoreline, and also by the State of California for its Eastshore State Park. .

In 1975, the East Bay Regional Park District signed a 50-year, no-cost lease with the United States Postal Service to create a shoreline park. In 1997, the district and California State Parks acquired North Point Isabel, with the district taking responsibility for monitoring and maintenance. As time passed, Point Isabel transitioned from an industrial area to a public space where people can learn about the area's natural history and enjoy the shoreline.

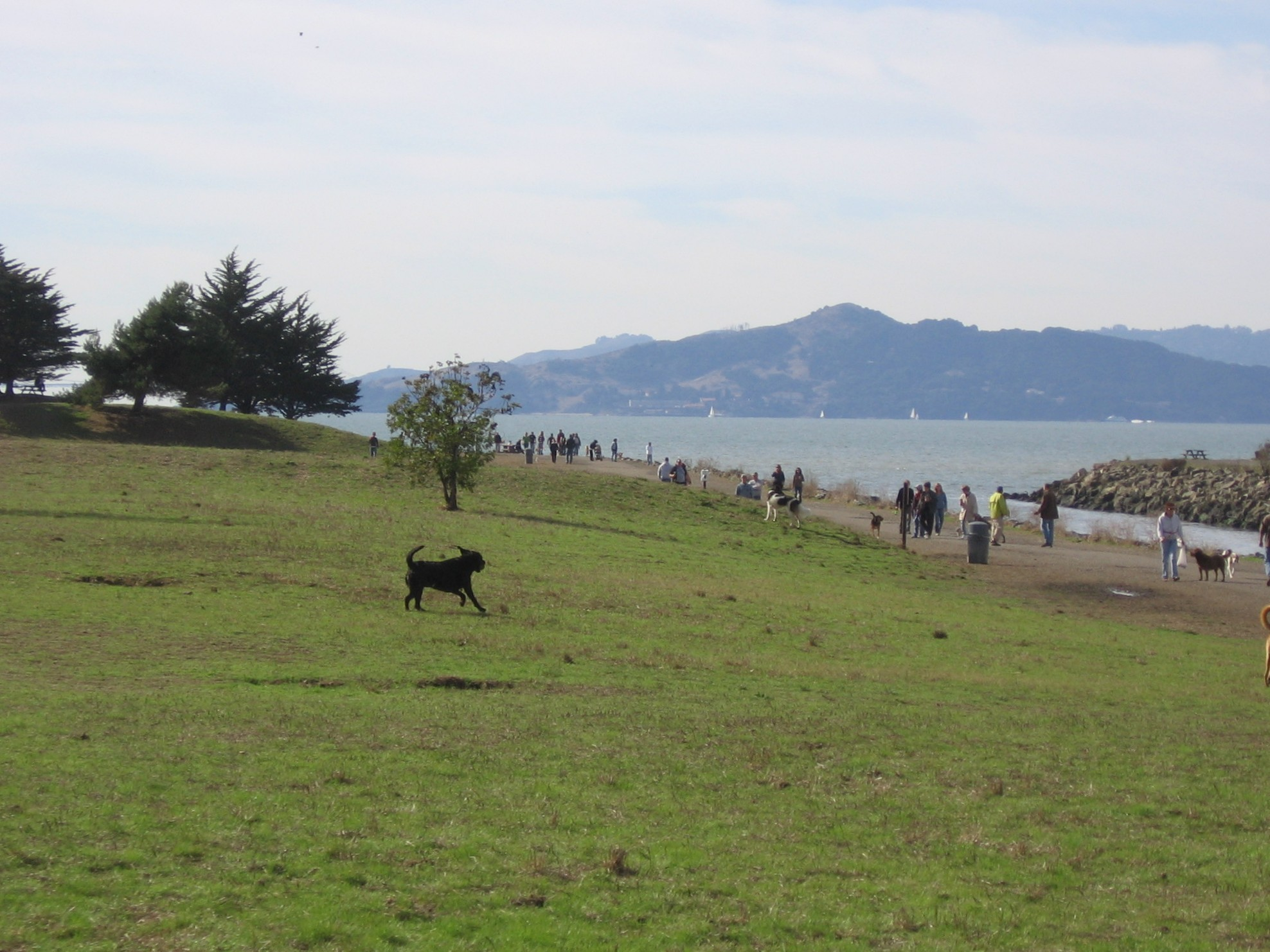
Point Isabel Dog Park

== Environmental concerns ==
A portion of Point Isabel, locally known as TEPCO beach, is covered in thousands of pieces of broken ceramic dishware. The Technical Porcelain and Chinaware Company (TEPCO) was founded in 1918 and grew substantially until the death of its founder, John Pagliero, in 1968. During the span of these fifty years, TEPCO discarded their broken dishware along the banks of Point Isabel.

Point Isabel served as a dumping ground for lead-filled battery casings, thus creating toxic emissions from within the soil. Thousands of tons of soil were removed from this site in the 1970s and 1980s, which was supposed to have resolved the issue. However, in 2018, lead leaks have proved that the job was not entirely completed in the 1970s and 1980s. The source of the recent lead leaks has not been discovered. Recently, the East Bay Regional Park District has planned the North Point Isabel Cap Resilience Project to improve the soil and drainage systems, reducing erosion and its overall surrounding environment.

In November 2025, the park district reported that lead have been migrating from some areas but there has been temporary protective measures, including fencing. To address these concerns, the park district developed the North Point Isabel Cap Resilience Project and partnered with the California Department of Parks and Recreation. Some of their future goals are to add imported soils and rock slope protection to raise the site elevation, replace the trail network with new paved paths for universal site access, and implement native plants for the dog park.
