= Castro Point =

Cape in Richmond, California, United States

Coordinates: 37.936410°N 122.413325°W

Castro Point is a cape in western Richmond, California, United States.

== History ==
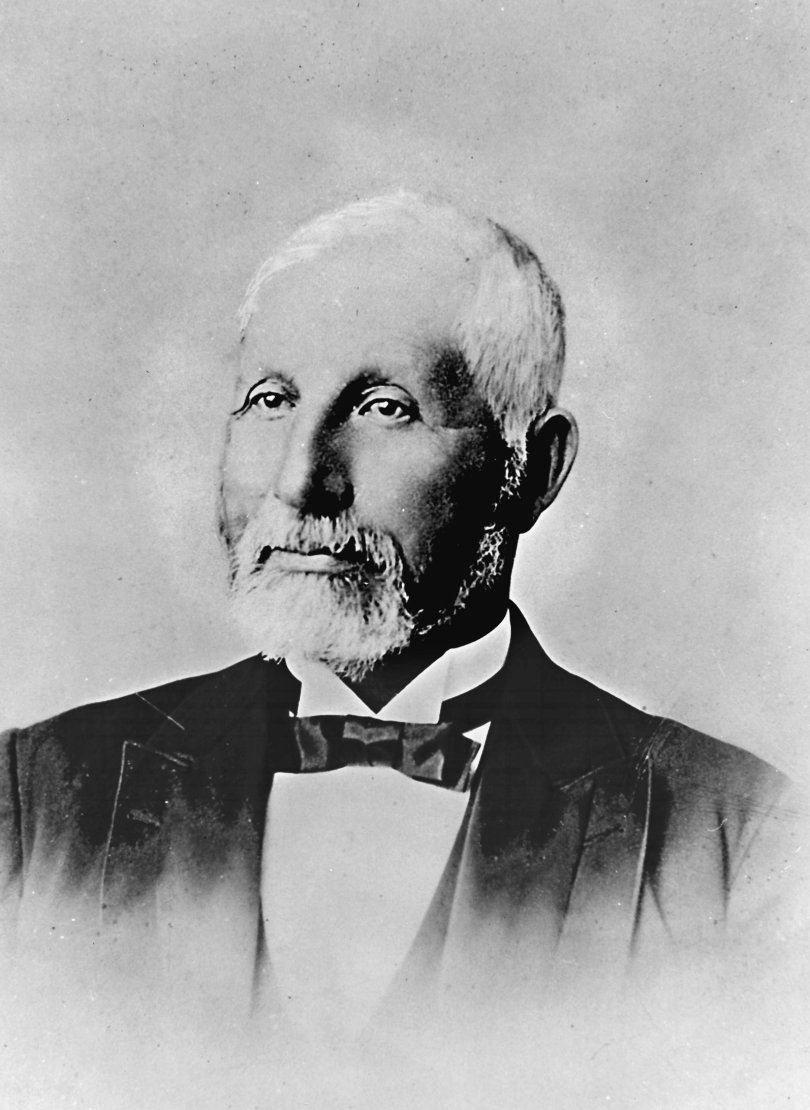
Castro Point is named after Don Víctor Castro, a Californio ranchero and politician.

Castro Point was once the east shore landing for the Richmond-San Rafael Car and Passenger Ferry that crossed the San Pablo Bay. It was also the western terminal for the East Shore and Suburban Railway connecting trains from Downtown Richmond and Oakland. The cape is the best launching spot for viewing the seals on the Castro Rocks underneath the Richmond-San Rafael Bridge and the cape is largely located in Point Molate Beach Park in addition to a Caltrans maintenance facility owned by the state of California.

Part of the movie Magnum Force was filmed here. Scenes 31-36 were mostly filmed at and around Pier 54 in San Francisco, and scene 34 ("Not enough experience", where Dirty Harry and the rookie cop were on motorcycles jumping aircraft carriers) was filmed at Castro Point with the San Rafael Bridge in the background. Only remnants of the piers that the old carriers were docked to still remain. The carriers were the escort carriers USS Badoeng Strait and the USS Rabaul.
