= Castro Rocks =

Rocks in the San Francisco Bay, California

Coordinates: 37.932817°N 122.416963°W

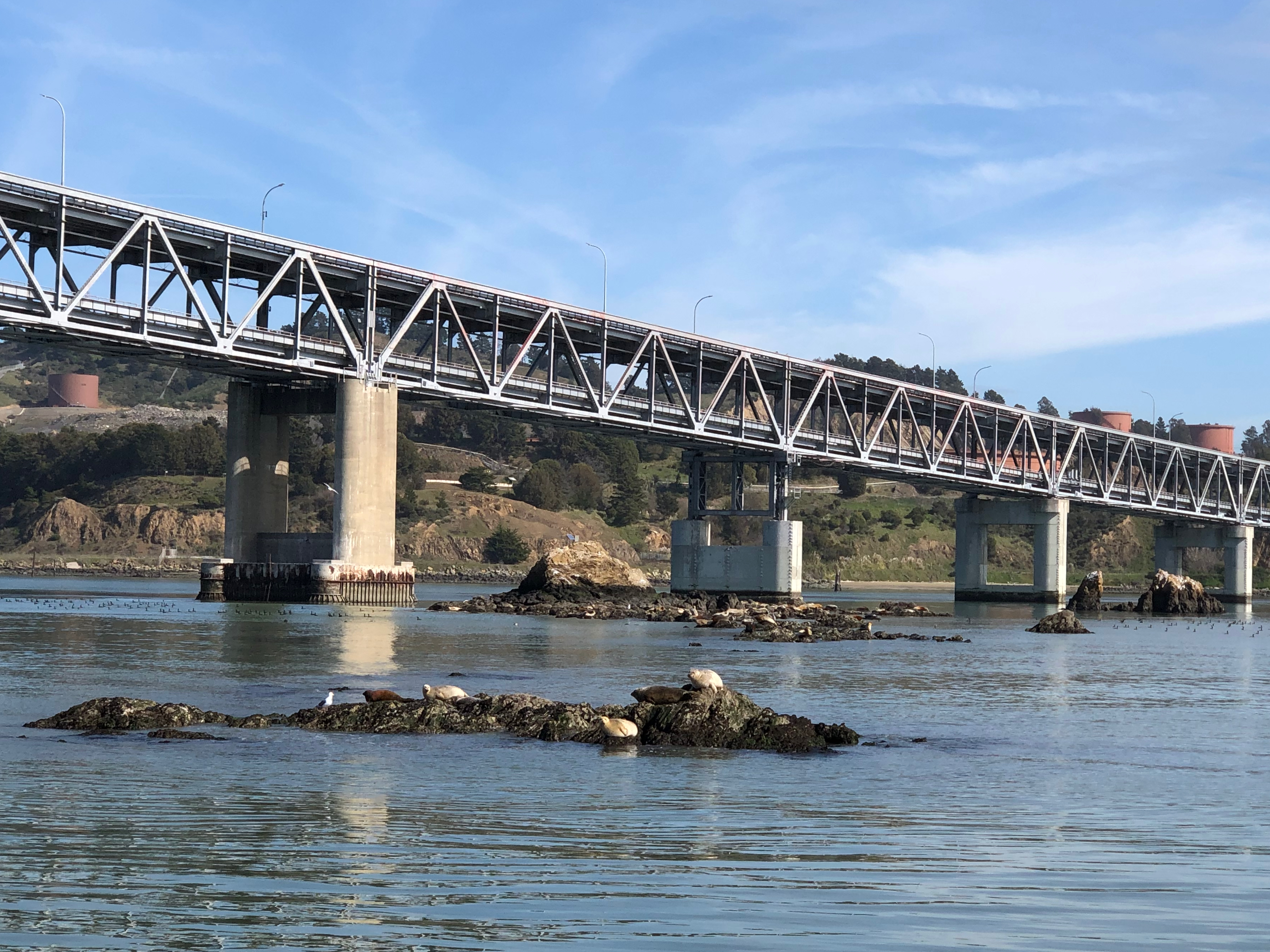
Castro Rocks with harbor seals

The Castro Rocks are several rocks in Richmond, California, protruding from the waters in San Francisco Bay between Castro Point and Red Rock Island. The rocks lie almost directly under the Richmond-San Rafael Bridge (I-580).

== Name ==
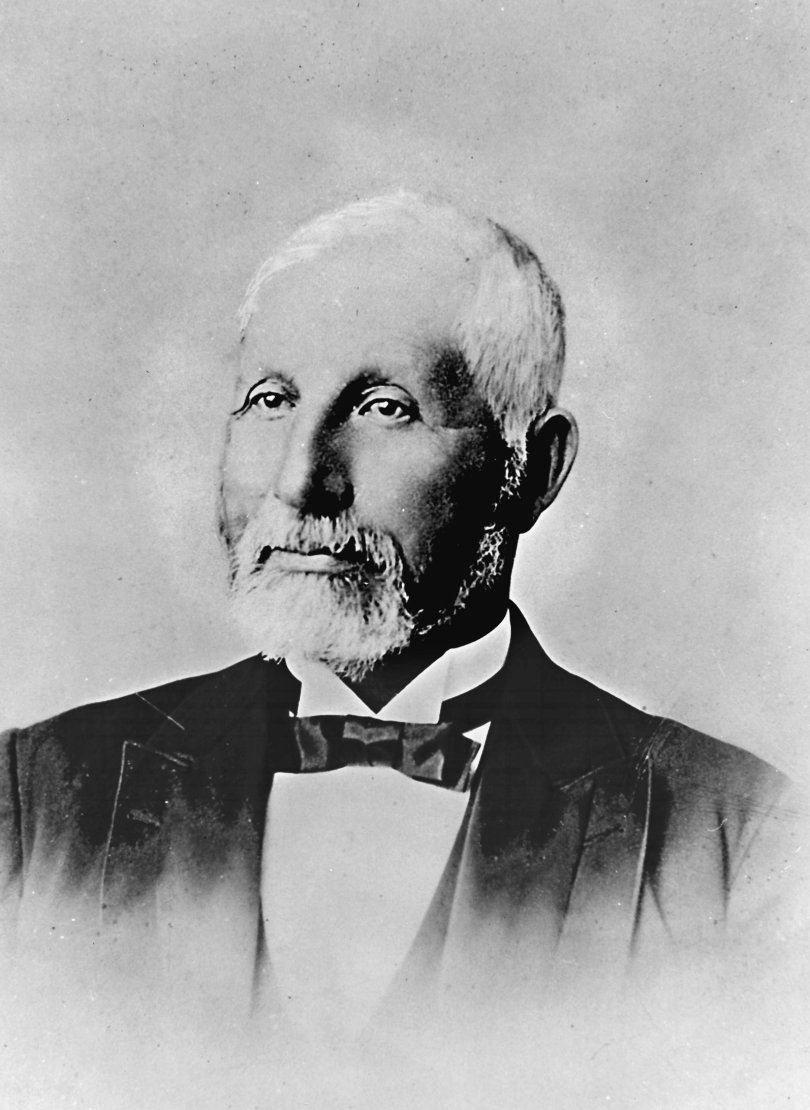
The Castro Rocks are named after Don Víctor Castro, a Californio ranchero and politician.

The rocks are named after Don Víctor Castro, a local rancho-era land owner. They are shown as "Castro Rocks" on an 1850 survey map of the San Francisco Bay area made by Cadwalader Ringgold.

== Harbor seals ==
Castro Rocks are the home of many harbor seals, which lie on them to rest and sunbathe. The rocks are the largest harbor seal rookery in the northern San Francisco Bay and the second largest in the Bay Area itself. There are also sometimes sea lions on the rocks. The rock's Harbor Seals also frequent Mowry Slough, Brooks Island, Yerba Buena Island, and Mare Island.

The seals at this location have high levels of toxic pollutants including the DDT, PCBs, PBDEs, PFOS, PFOA, and mercury.
