= María Gabriela Berreyesa Castro =

María Gabriela Berreyesa Castro, also known as María Gabriela Berrelleza (1780–1851), was a Californio landowner, from the notable Berryessa family of California.

== Biography ==
María Gabriela Berreyesa was born November 26, 1780, and christened the same day at Mission Santa Clara de Asís in upper Las Californias, near present-day San José. She was the first child of the family of María Gertrudis Peralta and Nicholas Antonio Berrelleza. On February 16, 1795, she married 22-year-old Francisco María Castro, third son of Joaquin de Castro, one of the founding settlers of the Pueblo de San Jose, and a corporal in the artillery company of Presidio San Francisco.

The two made their home in San José and produced thirteen offspring during 1796–1824. Castro was made an elector in 1822 after which he served as alcalde and on a civil board that heard disputes.

Castro explored land at the northeast edge of San Francisco Bay in 1823, and was granted Rancho San Pablo by Governor Luís Antonio Argüello. He and his family moved to the rancho some time after 1824. He died in 1831 at Rancho San Pablo.

Castro died on December 21, 1851, and was buried at Mission San Francisco de Asís, known as Mission Dolores, in San Francisco. Rancho San Pablo was patented by the U.S. to her children in 1852.

== See also ==
- Berreyesa family
