= Víctor Castro (landowner) =

American politician

Víctor Ramón Castro
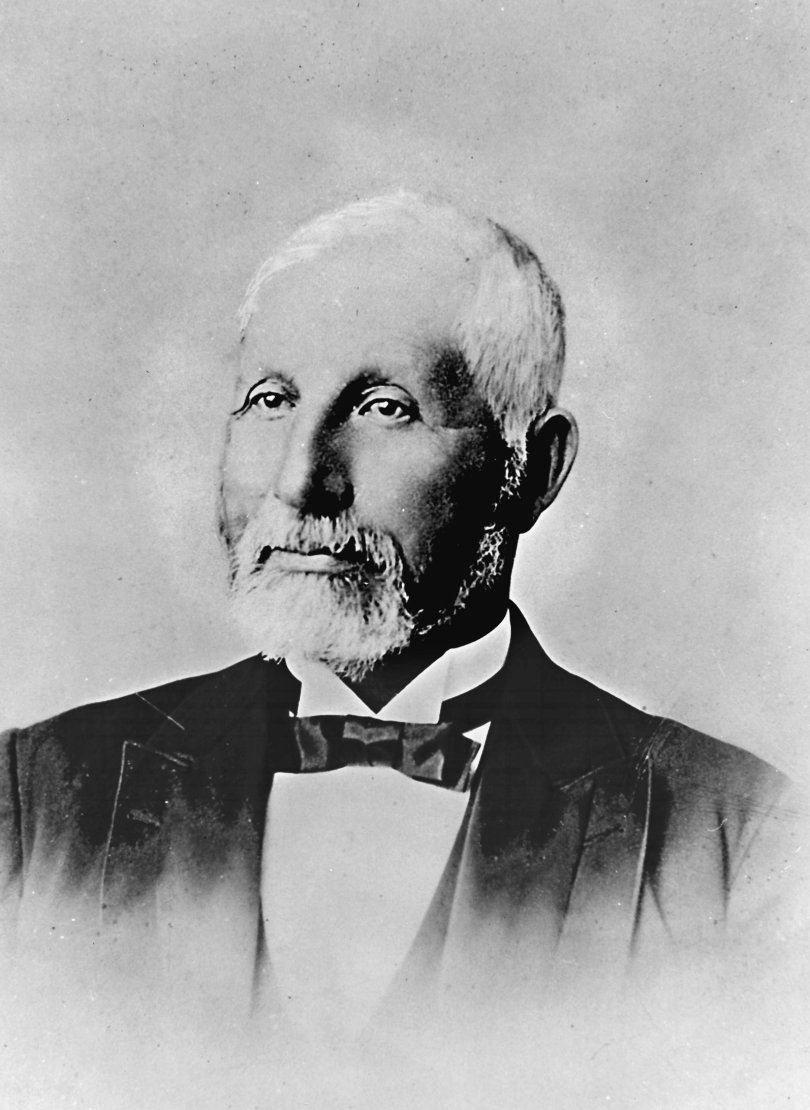

Contra Costa County Supervisor
- In office 1852

Personal details
- Born: March 6, 1817 San Francisco, California
- Died: May 5, 1900 (aged 83) El Cerrito, California
- Profession: Ranchero, businessman

Don Víctor Ramón Castro (March 6, 1817 – May 5, 1900) was a Californio ranchero, politician, and businessman. He was one of the largest landowners in Contra Costa and served as a Contra Costa County Supervisor. He operated one of the first ferries in the Bay Area.

== Life ==
Castro was born at the Presidio of San Francisco in 1817, as the son of Francisco María Castro, who later served as Alcalde of San Jose. His father was later granted Rancho San Pablo.

Castro married Luisa Martinez in 1836, the daughter of Don Ygnacio Martinez, grantee of the neighboring Rancho El Pinole.

Víctor Castro and his brother Juan José Castro were the grantees of Rancho El Sobrante in 1841.

Víctor Castro was elected as a juez de campo (field judge) in 1840 which gave him authority over roundups and branding of cattle in the area.

He was a renowned horseman and helped battle indigenous raiders who attacked other Mexican ranchos. He also warred with American immigrants who squatted on his land after the California Gold Rush. Castro was a local leader in times of both peace and conflict.

He remained active as a community leader after the annexation of California and was elected a Contra Costa County supervisor in 1852.

== Legacy ==
Castro Street in Martinez is named after Victor Castro, and is one of five consecutive streets in the downtown Martinez area that are named for the five sons-in-law of Ygnacio Martinez.

Point Isabel promontory and Point Isabel Regional Shoreline are named after his daughter Isabel.

Castro Street, Castro Creek, the Castro Rocks, Castro Point, Castro Cove and Castro Ranch Road in Richmond are named after his family.
