= Rancho San Pablo =

Land grant in California

Coordinates: 37.960°N 122.330°W

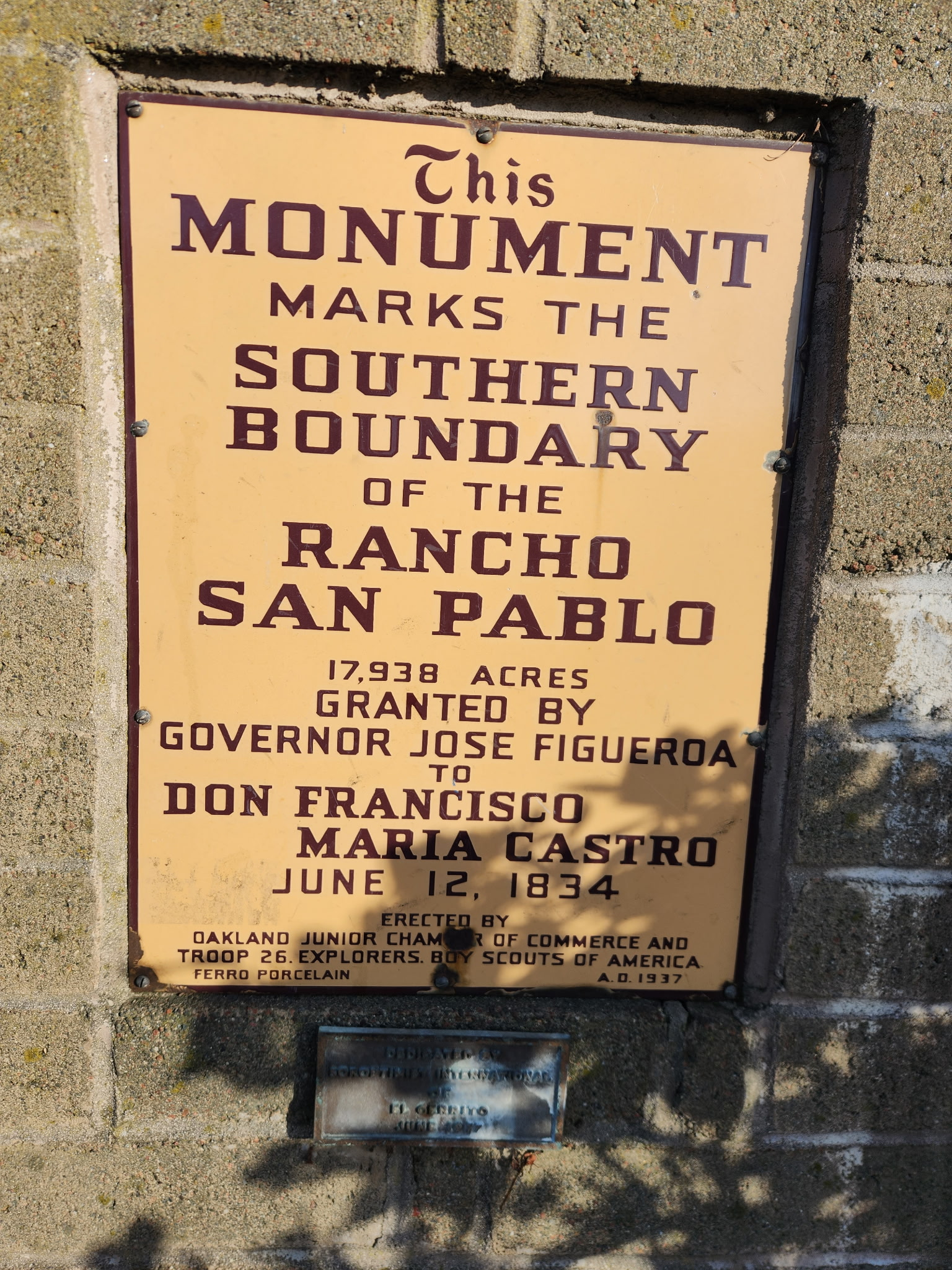
Rancho San Pablo sign on San Pablo Avenue at or near the boundary between two counties, Alameda and Contra Costa

Rancho San Pablo was a 17,939-acre (72.60 km^{2}) land grant in present-day Contra Costa County, California given in 1823 by Governor Luís Antonio Argüello to Francisco María Castro (1775–1831), a former soldier at the San Francisco Presidio and one-time alcalde of the Pueblo of San José. The grant was reconfirmed by Governor José Figueroa in 1834 to the heirs of Francisco Castro, including Víctor Castro. The San Pablo grant covered what is now Richmond, San Pablo, El Cerrito, and Kensington in western Contra Costa County.

== History ==
The land had previously been grazing land for cattle belonging to the Misión Dolores, but was secularized by the new Mexican republic. Francisco Maria Castro lived there with his wife María Gabriela Berreyesa and family from the late 1820s until his death in 1831. Governor of Mexican Alta California, Juan Alvarado, married one of the Castro daughters in 1839. After his term as governor was completed, they retired to her family property on Rancho San Pablo.

With the cession of California to the United States following the Mexican–American War, the 1848 Treaty of Guadalupe Hidalgo provided that the land grants would be honored. As required by the Land Act of 1851, a claim for Rancho San Pablo was filed with the Public Land Commission by Joaquín Ysidro Castro in 1852, and the grant was patented to Joaquín Ysidro Castro in 1878. A separate claim was filed by William C. Jones et al in 1853 but was rejected.
