= Redwood Creek (Contra Costa County) =

Creek in San Francisco Bay Area

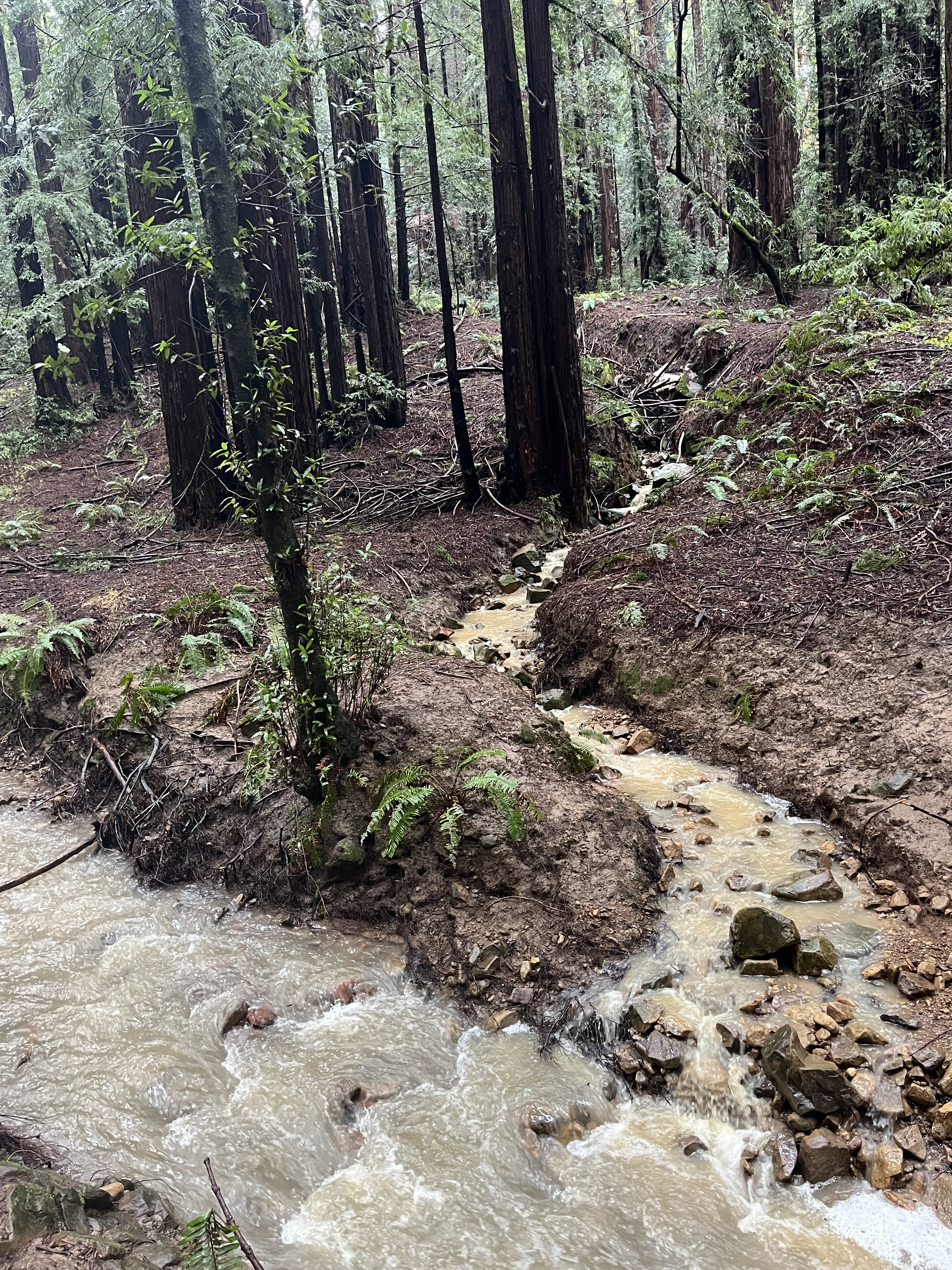
- A tributary joins Redwood Creek in Reinhardt Redwood Regional Park near Canyon, California (April 8, 2023)

Location
- Country: United States
- State: California
- County: Contra Costa County

Physical characteristics
- Source: Reinhardt Redwood Regional Park
- Mouth
  - coordinates: 37°47′29″N 122°7′51″W
- Length: ~3 miles (4.8 km)

Redwood Creek is an approximately 4 mile-long perennial creek in Contra Costa and Alameda Counties, in the San Francisco Bay Area. It is named for the redwood forest from which it emerges.

== Course ==
Redwood creek begins as two spring-fed branches in Dr. Aurelia Reinhardt Redwood Regional Park near Canyon and Moraga, California. It flows generally south through its narrow and densely wooded canyon for the entirety of its course. It receives numerous intermittent tributaries originating out of the canyon. Historically, Redwood Creek was a tributary to San Leandro Creek, but following the construction of the Upper San Leandro Reservoir in 1926, the confluence of these two creeks was inundated.

== Geography ==
Redwood Creek is located in Alameda and Contra Costa County, California, in the San Francisco Bay Area. Though the Redwood Creek watershed itself has very little development, it is surrounded by a rapidly encroaching network of suburbs.

It is located in the westernmost of a series of linear north-south canyons in the Berkeley Hills. Located directly across the San Francisco Bay from the Golden Gate, the low hills where Redwood Creek originates are subject to frequent low fog which provides conditions suitable for coast redwood (Sequoia sempervirens) in an environment with otherwise too little precipitation to support them. On average the watershed receives 27.5 in (700 mm) of rainfall in a year.

Redwood Creek is paralleled by the Stream Trail in Reinhardt Redwood Regional Park for much of its length and can be accessed from a number of trailheads on Skyline Road.

== Ecology ==
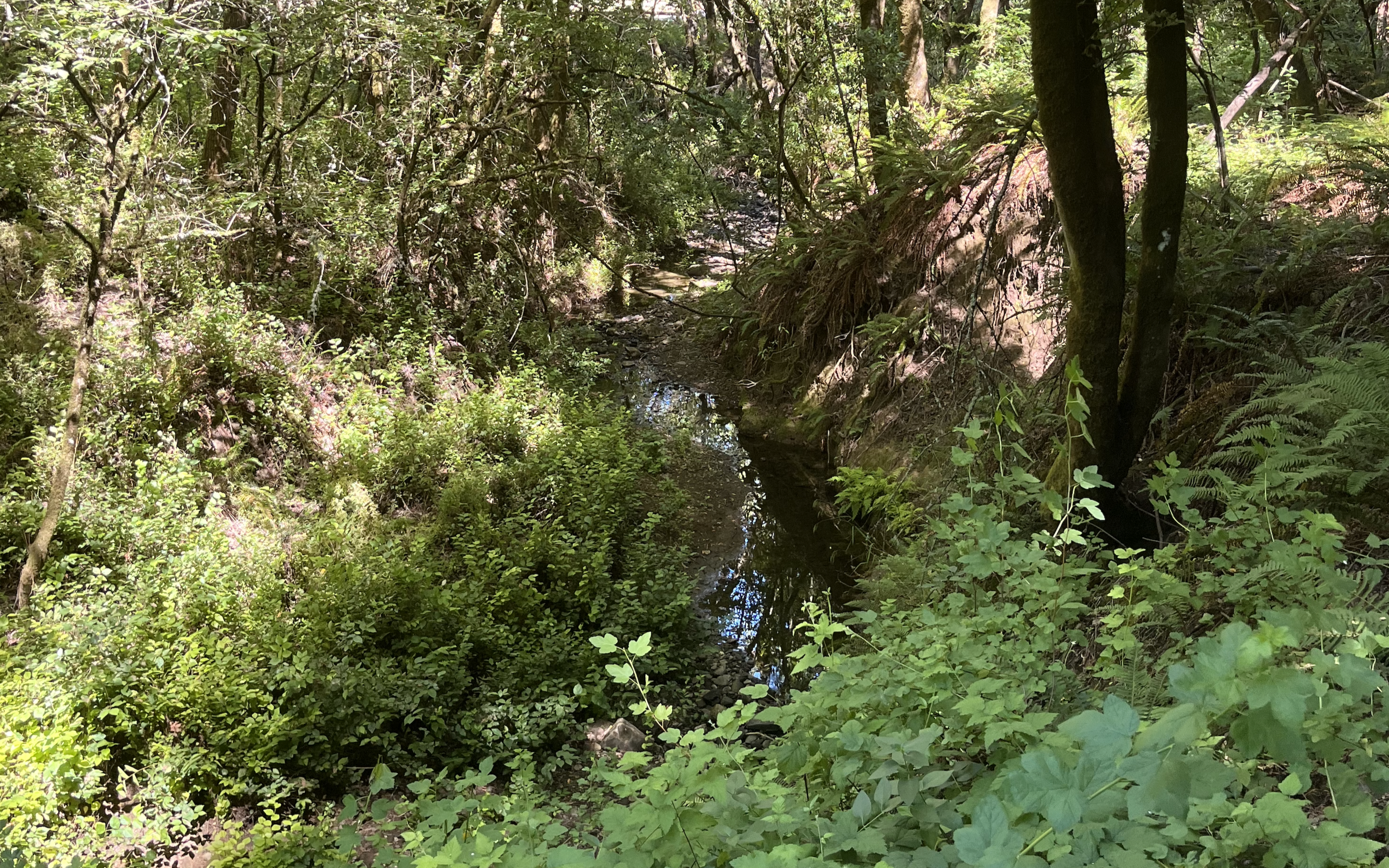
Redwood Creek is well-shaded and densely vegetated for much of its length (June 25, 2022)

Redwood Creek is unique among streams of the East Bay in that it is primarily forested with Coast Redwood. While common in areas closer to the coast, naturally occurring redwoods are absent from the rest of the East Bay and the inland South Bay due to the area's generally hot climate and lower precipitation than coastal areas. A low break in the Berkeley Hills allows for frequent infiltration of maritime fog into the canyon of Redwood Creek. This fog, in addition to high average precipitation, supports the redwoods which are able to absorb water through their leaves. This redwood forest was entirely logged in the 1850s to fuel the growth of San Francisco and other cities, with 3 mills being erected on Redwood Creek alone, severely disrupting the structure of the creek's ecology.

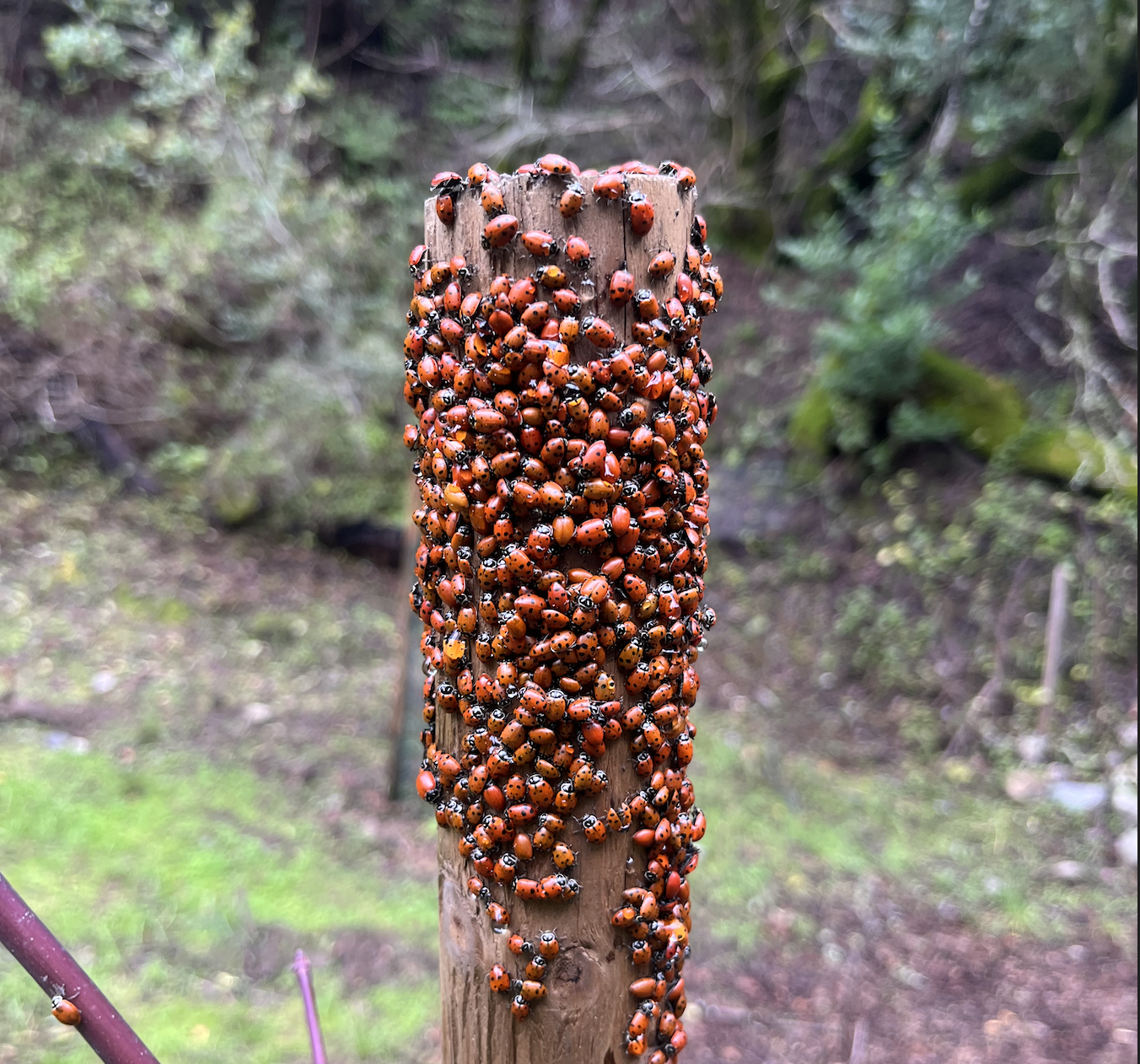
A group of ladybugs (Hippodamia convergens), using habitat found along Redwood Creek to hibernate (January 3, 2024)

Vegetation typical of the redwood forest grows along Redwood Creek, including California bay (Umbellularia californica), California hazel (Corylus cornuta var. californica), Pacific madrone (Arbutus menziesii), western sword fern (Polystichum munitum), California blackberry (Rubus ursinus) and redwood sorrel (Oxalis oregana) are commonly found. Every winter, habitat along Redwood Creek hosts a consistent population of hibernating lady beetles (Hippodamia convergens) which can be seen in a number of places along its course.

Exotic and invasive species of plants, which compete with native species are also prevalent in the Redwood Creek catchment, especially Himalayan blackberry (Rubus armeniacus) which covers large areas and grows rapidly.

Black-tailed deer, coyotes, raccoons and a wide variety of other mammals common to the surrounding area utilize Redwood Creek and the habitats found in its watershed year-round. Redwood Creek provides ample shade and cool, consistent flow through the summer, a rarity in the hills of Contra Costa County.

The tall second-growth redwoods provide ideal locations for songbirds such as the hermit thrush, Bewick's wren, northern mockingbird and a variety of finches, jays and sparrows, both resident and migratory.

=== Rainbow trout population ===
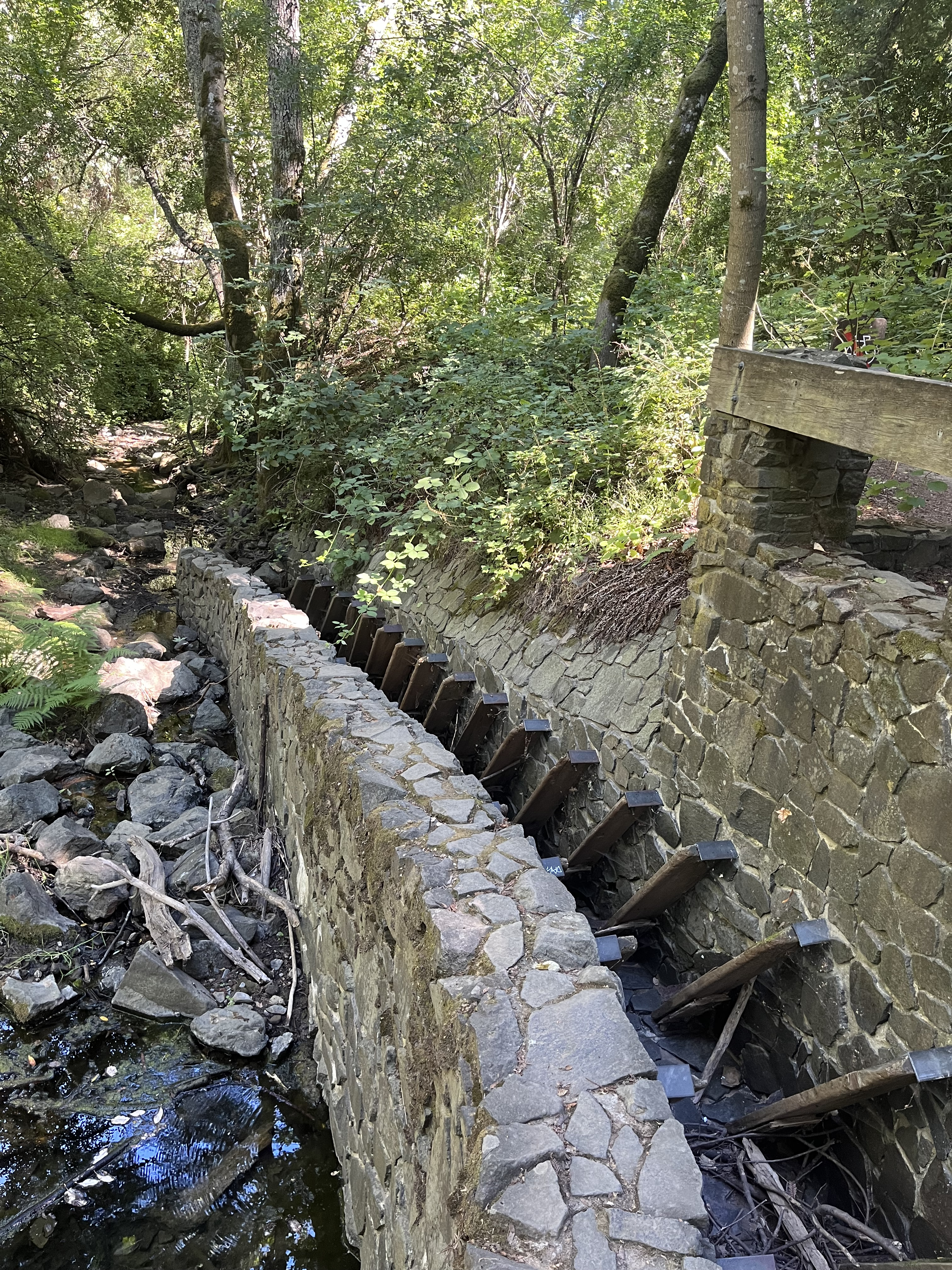
A fish ladder at a bridge over redwood creek in Redwood Regional Park for the purpose of allowing rainbow trout upstream to spawn (June 25, 2022)

Redwood Creek is home to a rare and endangered population of coastal rainbow trout. Rainbow trout are native to many of the perennial streams of the San Francisco Bay Area, though they are currently extirpated from the majority of watersheds in the region as a result of land use changes, pollution and residential development throughout the 20th century. The trout in Redwood Creek are non-hybridized, meaning they have not interbred with hatchery-derived trout, and represent a robust population stronghold within the San Leandro Creek watershed.

A report conducted by Dr. Robert E. Leidy for the Center for Ecosystem Management, titled Historical Status and Current Distribution of Steelhead/Rainbow Trout in Streams of the San Francisco Estuary, California, stated that:

Redwood Creek has value as a nursery for immature fish as well as providing spawning habitat. Summer 'carryover”' of young rainbow trout in isolated pools was considered to be good... Genetic analysis performed on O. mykiss from Redwood Creek and Kaiser Creek found the fish to be unique populations of non-hybridized, coastal rainbow trout (Leidy, 59)

Fishing in Redwood Creek, or any other waterway on EBMUD land, is prohibited and punishable by a fine. The trout population in Redwood Creek is a rare and sensitive population of native fish that are threatened by human interference in their habitat, particularly from off-leash dogs which degrade the stream banks and instream habitat. Visitors to Redwood Creek are advised not venture off trail in order to preserve the habitat found alongside it.

== See also ==
- Coast redwood
- Coastal rainbow trout
- Microclimate
- East Bay
- San Leandro Creek
- Upper San Leandro Reservoir
- Kaiser Creek
- Buckhorn Creek (California)
- Rocky Ridge (California)
