= East Bay Redwoods =

Isolated population of coast redwoods

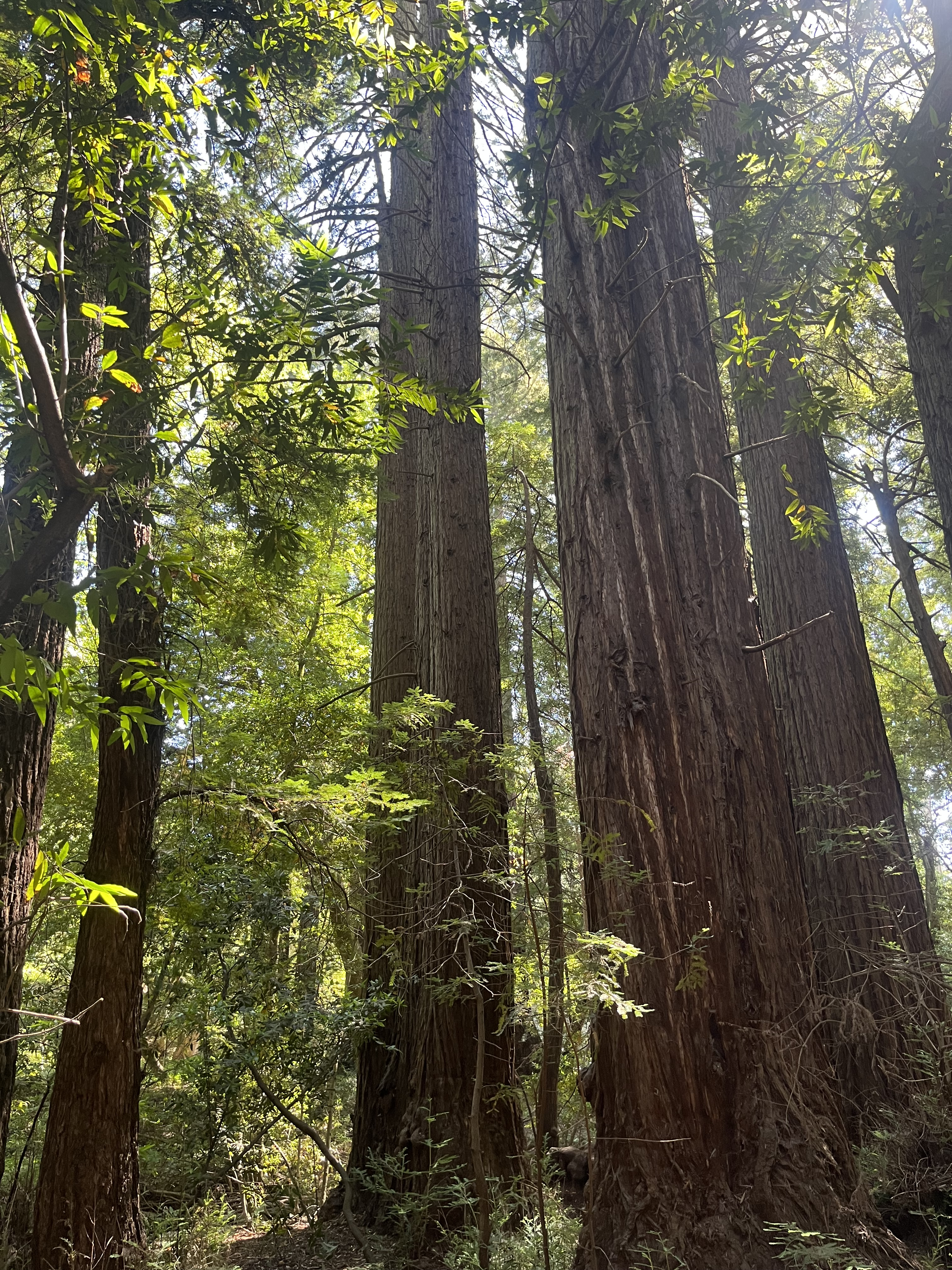
Redwood Trees along San Leandro Creek catch the light of a Summer evening (August 4th, 2023)

The East Bay Redwoods are an isolated population of coast redwoods that exist a considerable distance inland from the coast in the Berkeley Hills in western Contra Costa County, California. Stands of Sequoia sempervirens, the Coast Redwood, occur on the west coast from Big Sur to extreme southwestern Oregon. Their preferred habitat is the temperate and perennially foggy western slopes of the California Coast Ranges; a reliance on marine climates generally restricts their range to a narrow band along the central and northern coasts of California.

== Geography ==
The San Francisco Bay Area's Berkeley Hills are a member of the Inner Coast Ranges and generally exhibit vegetation characteristic of the dry California chaparral and woodlands biome. The western sections of the range are not particularly high, and are frequently inundated with fog drifting inland from the Pacific Ocean. For this reason, the Berkeley Hills exhibit a Mediterranean climate modulated by regular marine influence. This unique microclimate has allowed Coast redwoods to thrive in one of the most isolated locations in their natural range.

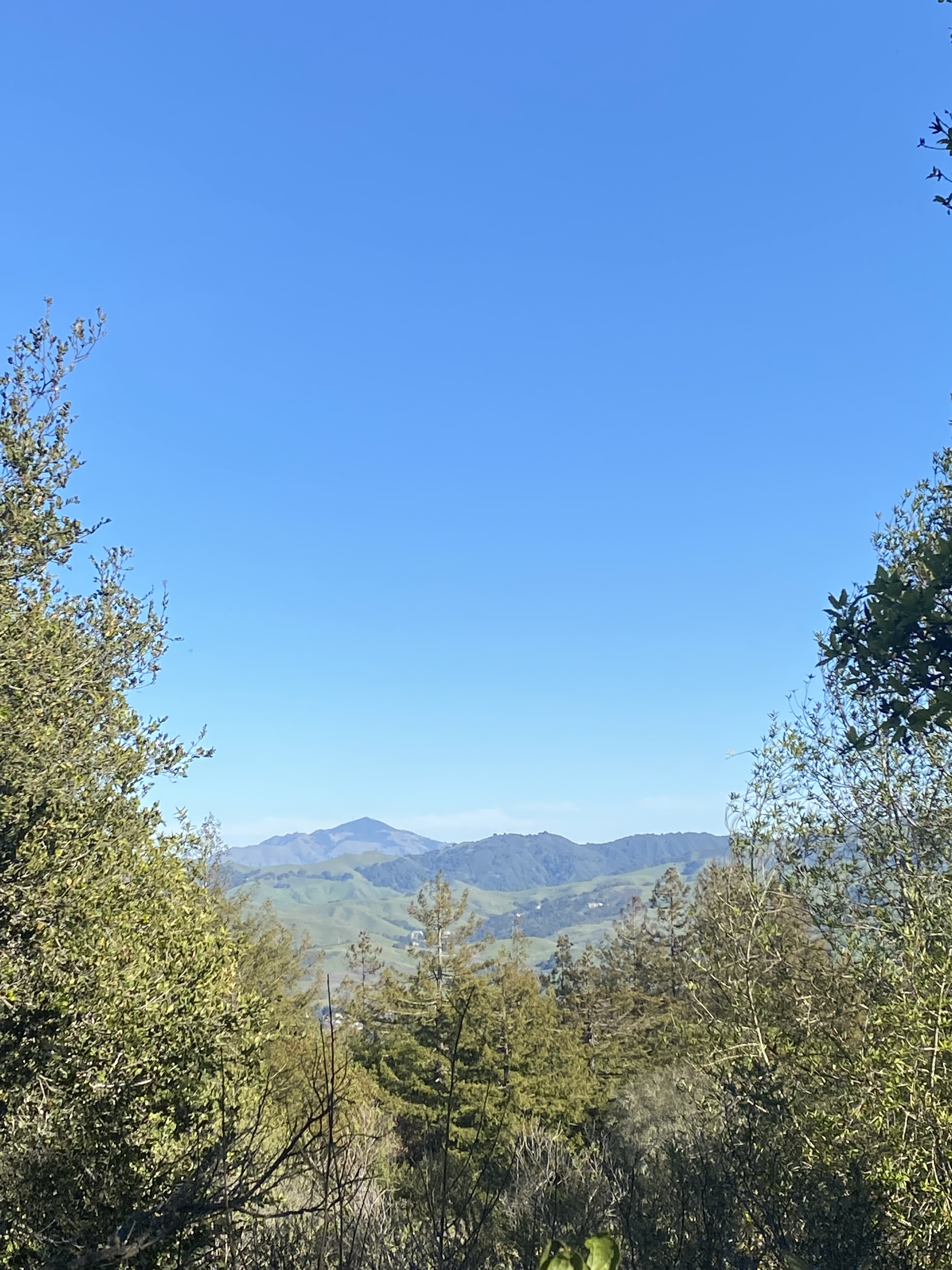
An opening in the forest reveals views of Las Trampas Peak and Mount Diablo and a difference between the more mesic habitat in the redwoods and that of the surrounding region (January 12, 2022)

Contra Costa County's only naturally occurring redwoods are located in three north-south trending canyons in western Contra Costa County near the towns of Moraga and Piedmont, California in the upper watershed of San Leandro Creek; its tributaries Redwood Creek and Indian Creek rise in and near the redwoods and receive flow from a number of spring-fed streams flowing out of the hills. The forest is about 2 miles wide and 3 miles long.

Pinehurst and Redwood roads are the only roads that traverse the redwoods.

The Dr. Aurelia Reinhardt Redwood Regional Park occupies a portion of the remaining redwood forest along Redwood Creek, and is a popular outdoor recreational area for locals, in Castro Valley while the redwood forest along upper San Leandro creek is managed as part of EBMUD's San Leandro Creek watershed and a permit is required for entry.

A number of hiking trails trace their way through the redwoods which connect to other regional parks like Sibley Volcanic Regional Preserve and the Upper San Leandro Reservoir.

A marker along Redwood Creek denotes the spot where in 1855, Dr. W.P. Gibbons of the California Academy of Sciences identified the Rainbow trout under the taxonomic system, calling them Salmo Irideus, they have since been reclassified as Onchorhynchus mykiss. The community of Canyon, California lies along upper San Leandro Creek in the heart of the redwood forest.

== Ecology ==
The East Bay Redwoods are largely undeveloped and in a semi-natural state today. The redwoods seen in the forest today are second or third-growth specimens which are considerably younger than the former old-growth forest that existed in the canyons. One specimen in the old-growth forest had a circumference of 32 feet, while two trees on the westernmost fringes of the forest were large enough to be used for navigation while entering the San Francisco Bay 16 miles to the west. Many of the trees in the forest were over 300 feet tall. It is believed that the unique combination of coastal fog and ample sunlight in the inland East Bay provides optimal growth conditions for redwoods.

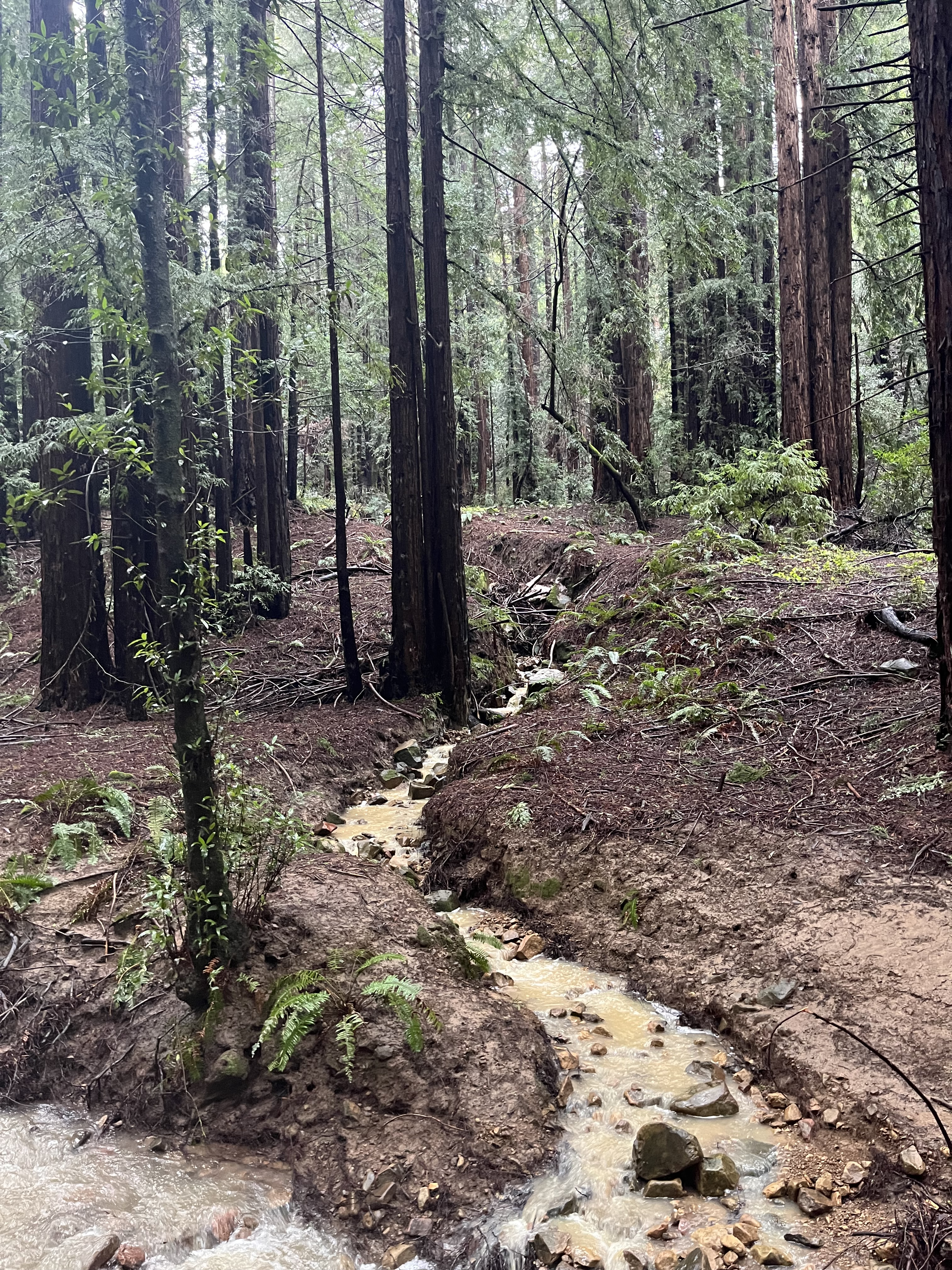
A tributary connects with the main stem of Redwood Creek in Contra Costa County, CA (March 12th, 2023)

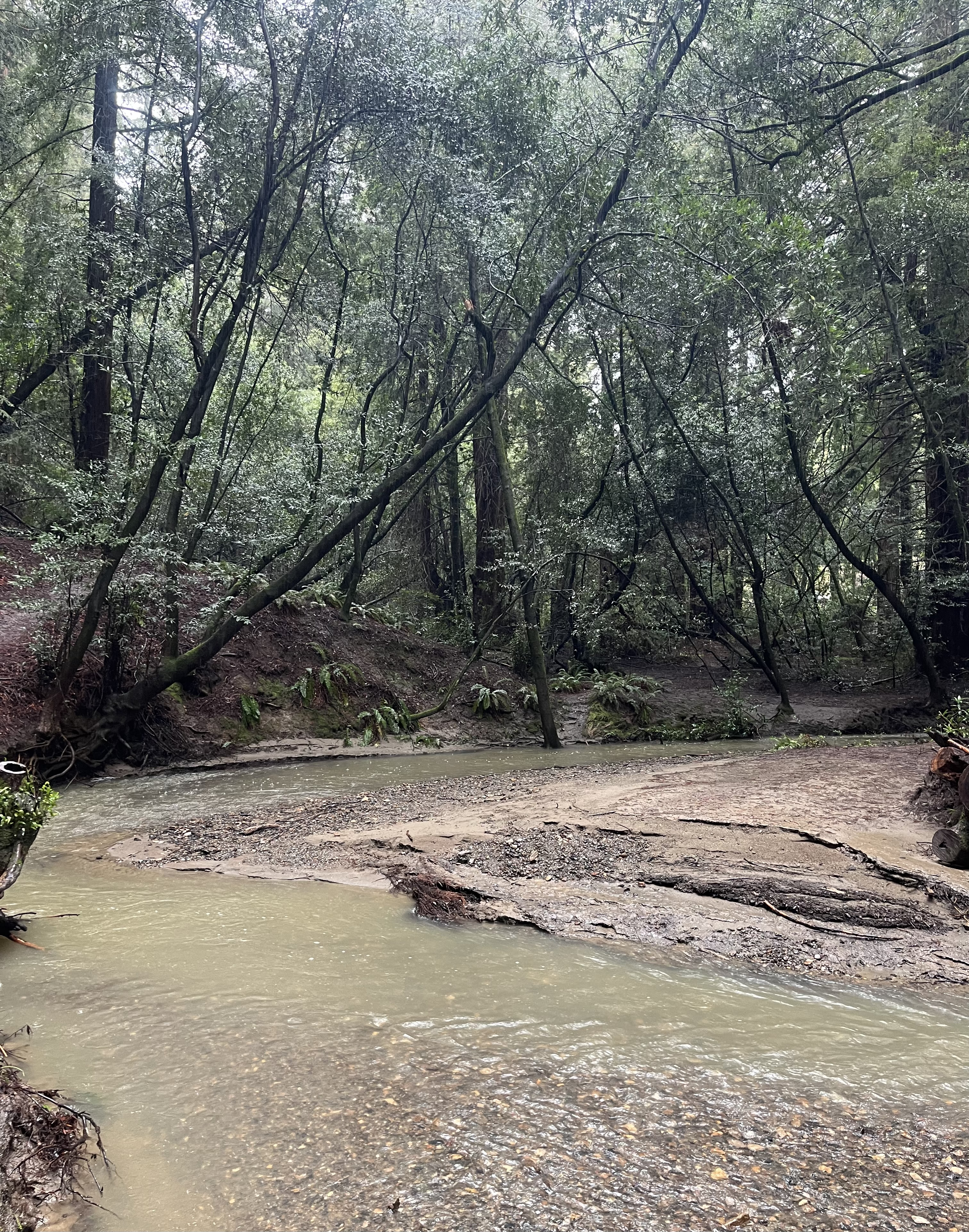
San Leandro Creek courses through the Redwoods during a spring rainstorm. Sword ferns and Bay trees grow along the banks (March 12th, 2023)

Extensive logging in the 19th century, particularly after the annexation of California in 1850, to fuel the growth of San Francisco and San Antonio turned the forest into "a sea of stumps". At one time in the mid-1850s, there were over a dozen mills operating in the east bay redwoods. Logging operations in the three redwood bearing canyons completely cleared the forest by the middle of the 1860s. The streams were filled with silt and wood shavings as the forests were cleared. Today, many portions of Redwood and San Leandro Creeks have undergone extensive downcutting.

Despite the damage sustained by the East Bay Redwoods in the 19th century, today they host a number of plant species endemic to the Redwood Forest. Western sword fern, lady-fern, Western hazelnut and Big-leaf maple are uncommon in other places in Contra Costa County but grow frequently in the East Bay Redwoods. California bay and Madrone are found commonly among the redwoods.

Local fauna include Black-tailed deer, Coyotes, Raccoons along with a wide variety of songbirds and birds of prey. The redwood forest provides a refuge for animals from harsh Mediterranean summer conditions in the Berkeley Hills by providing shade, cooler temperatures and water.

The creeks in the East Bay Redwoods, particularly Redwood and San Leandro Creeks are among a handful of East Bay waterways that retain their native coastal rainbow trout populations. The lack of urban development and favorable instream conditions have allowed these trout to persist, though they are threatened by drought and human interference in their habitat. Since the construction of Lake Chabot and Upper San Leandro Reservoir, the trout in Redwood and upper San Leandro creeks are non-hybridized.

== History ==
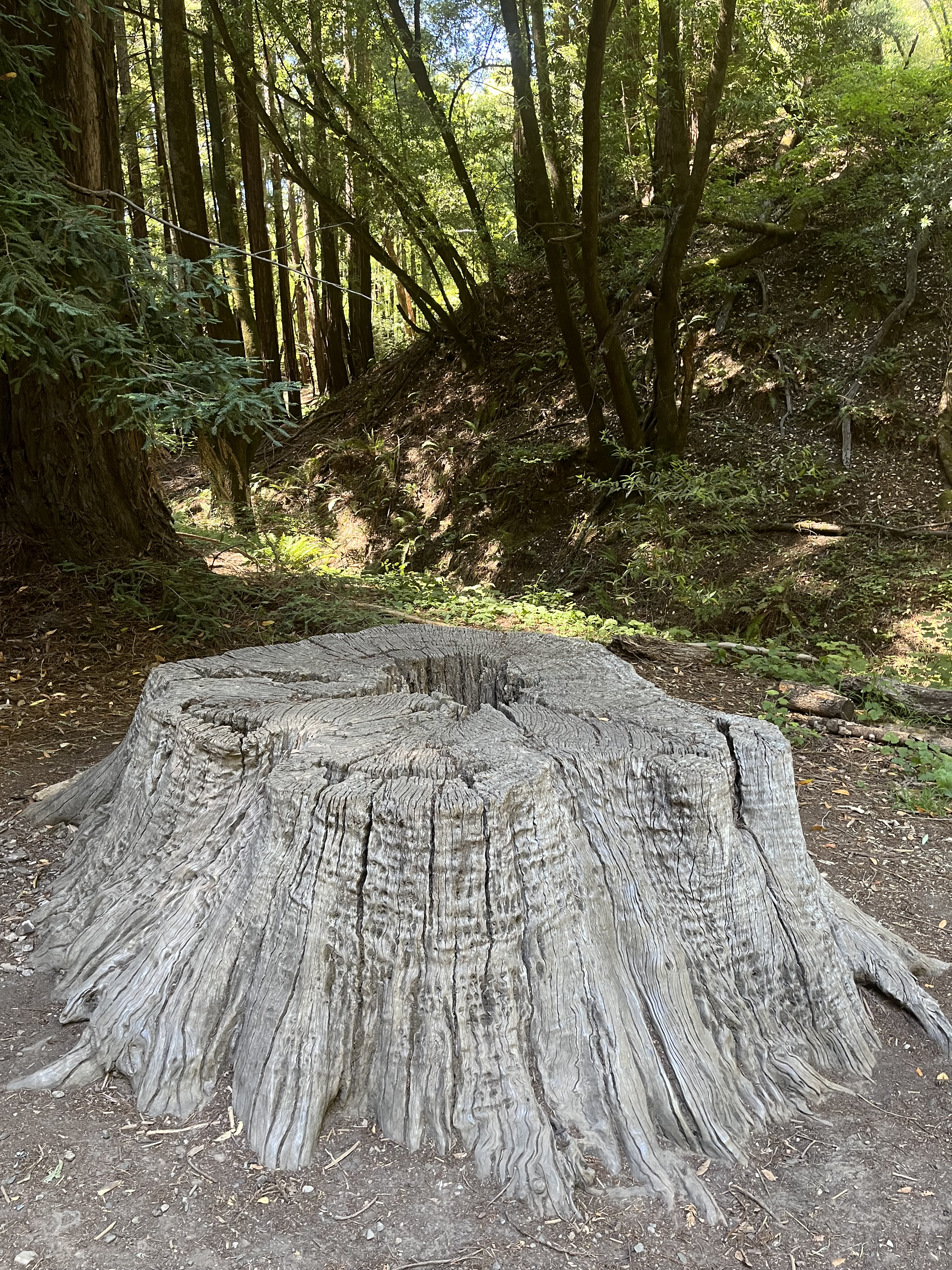
The stump of a cut redwood tree in Redwood Regional Park (June 25th, 2022)

The east bay redwoods were an important place for the local Saclan and Ohlone Native Americans both sprititually and materially; the forest provided these groups with resources not found in the habitats common to other parts of the dry east bay. Permanent and semi-permanent habitation sites have been identified within the redwoods which are a testament to a continued native presence in the area for centuries.

Europeans first encountered the east bay redwoods during the De Anza Expedition into the Bay area in 1776. With the establishment of Mission San José and the pueblo of San Jose, Europeans began to harvest trees from the east bay redwoods. Timber from the redwoods was cut for the needs of the mission and other facilities during the turn of the 19th century, but the impact on the forest overall was negligible. During the pre-American period in California, the redwoods were known as the San Antonio redwoods, named for the nearby port of San Antonio, now Oakland, California.

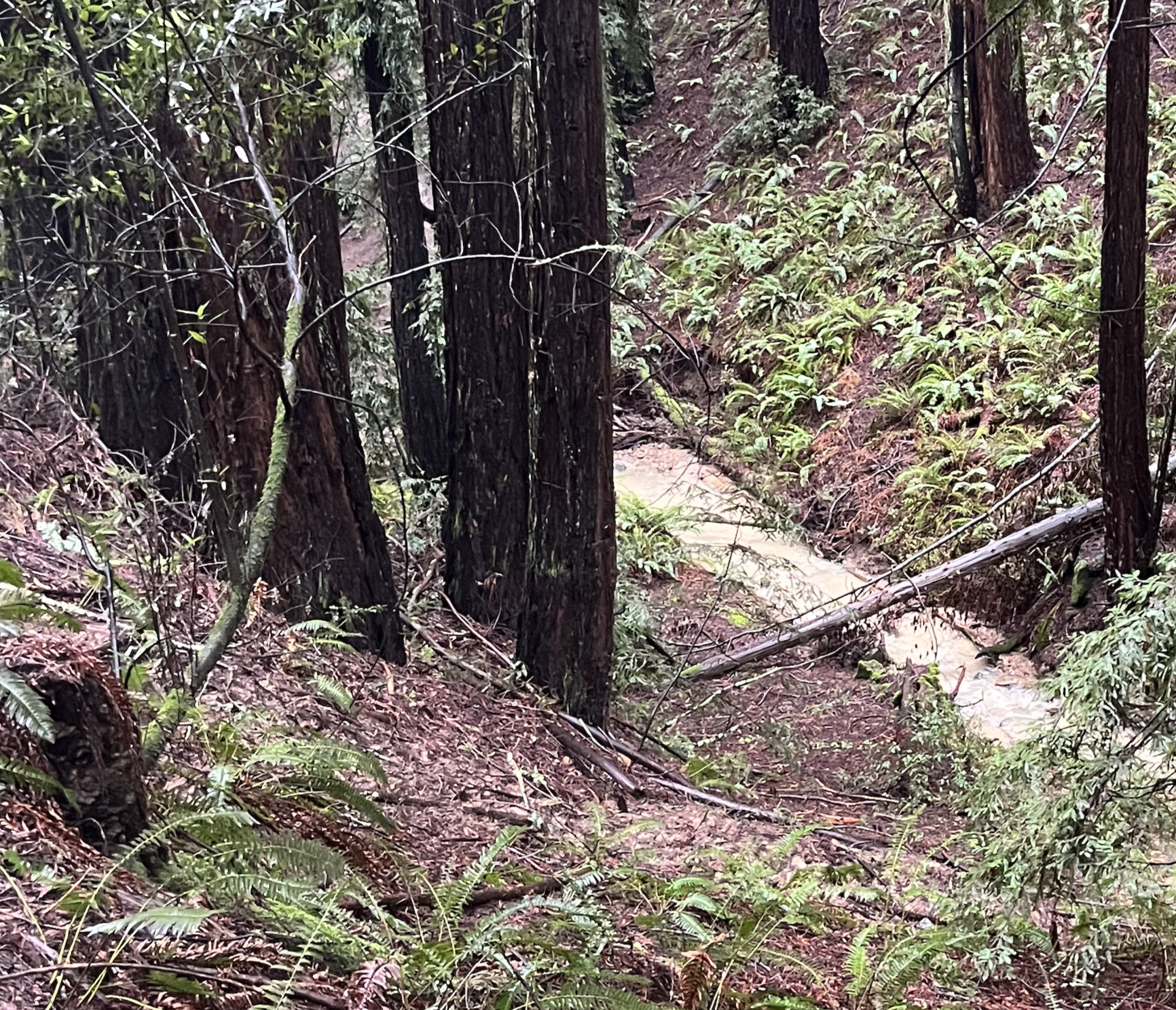
Redwood Creek near its source in Reinhardt Redwood Regional Park (March 12th, 2023)

With the Spanish cession of Alta California to Mexico in 1821, commercial exploitation of the east bay redwoods continued on a small scale.

In 1846, the Bartleson–Bidwell Party crossed the Sierra Nevada and became the first American immigrants to enter California by land; This event would mark the beginning of the American period in California. Many of them would end up spending time in the east bay redwoods as they offered one of the most easily obtainable sources of wealth in the territory.

After 1848, following the discovery of gold at Sutter's Mill, demand for lumber surged in California, particularly to fuel the growth of San Francisco.

Unsuccessful miners returning from the Sierra Nevada found work in the redwoods. As mission and rancho land in the east bay was privatized and settled through the second half of the 19th century, demand for timber increased further to build new towns and other projects. The 1850s saw a flurry of logging activity in response to the flood of American settlers in the territory; James Lamson, a one-time logger and diarist wrote of the scene in the east bay redwoods in 1853:

"These woods were filled in all directions with a busy throng of men, and the forests were fast disappearing before them."

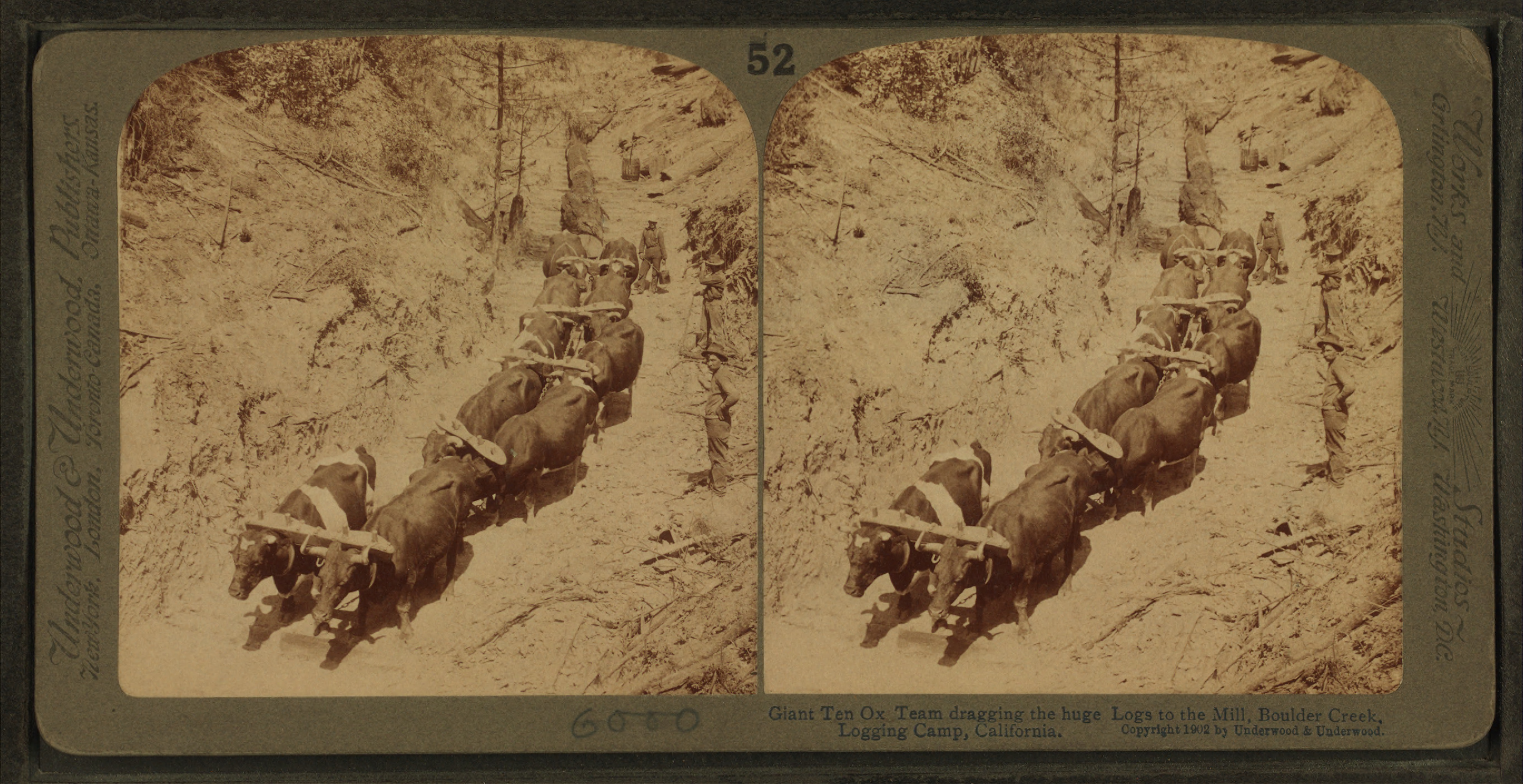
Ox hauling redwood logs for processing at a mill, Santa Cruz Mountains in the 19th century. Scenes such as this would have been common in the east bay redwoods during the early 1850s

The redwoods were one of the most populated areas of the East Bay during the first decade of American control in the region. During the first half of the 1850s, lumber produced by the mills in the east bay redwoods fueled the growth of towns like Martinez, Benicia, Hayward and Walnut Creek. Many of the roadways in the east bay can trace their origins back to the road systems developed for hauling lumber.

The present city of Lafayette, California formed as the result of it being a natural stopping point for ox teams hauling redwood timbers to the port at Martinez.

Being small when compared to other redwood forests in the Bay Area and under such great demand, the industry quickly stripped the east bay redwoods. By 1860, the redwoods in the east bay had been completely cleared, and the lumber industry that developed around them faded away.

After the 1906 San Francisco earthquake, the east bay redwoods were again logged.
