= Kaiser Creek =

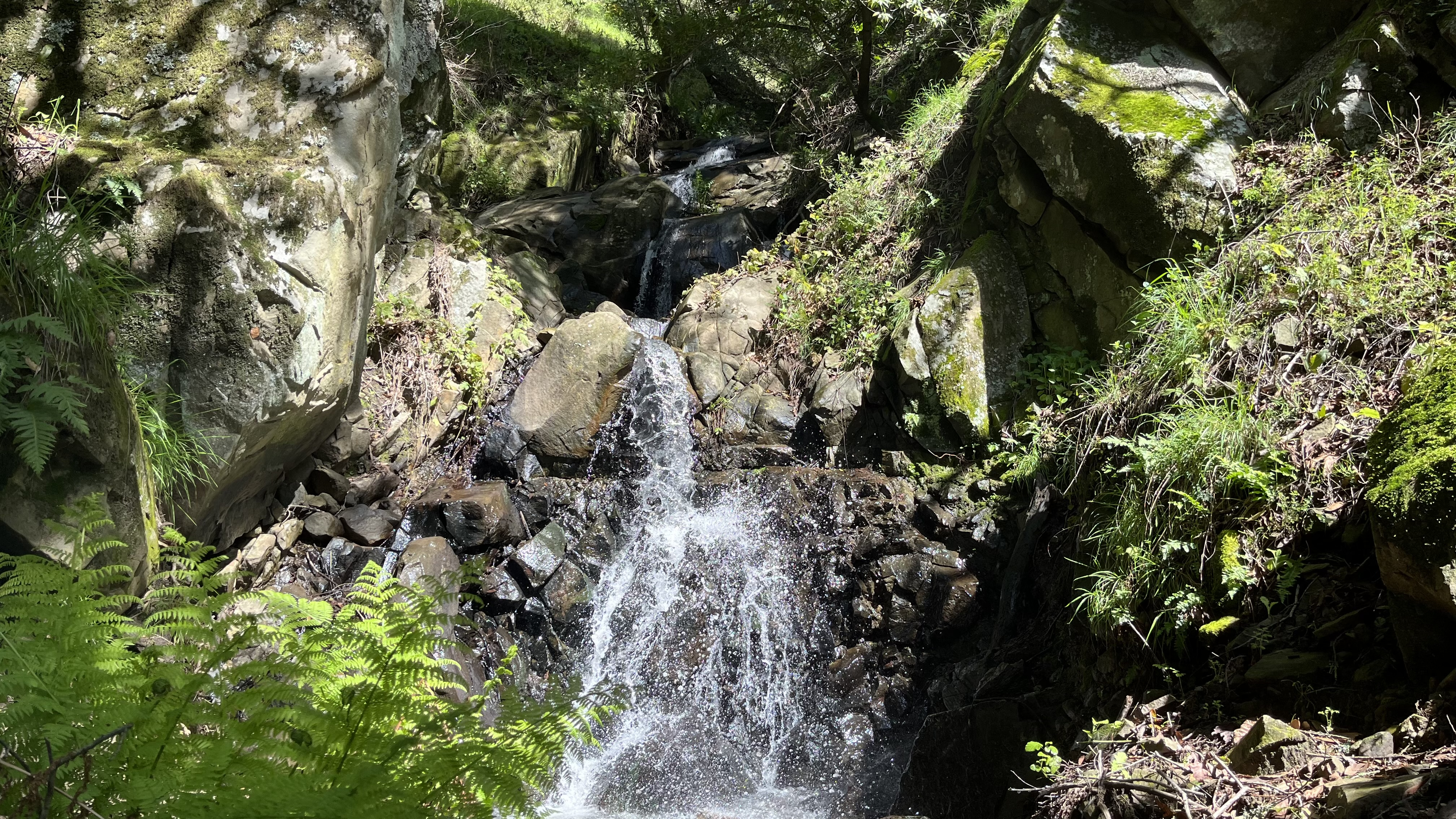
- Kaiser Creek has eroded through multiple thrusted blocks of Miocene sandstone, creating a number of steep cataracts (March 8th, 2024)

- Location of the mouth in California

Location
- State: California

Physical characteristics
- Source: Rocky Ridge (California)
  - location: Contra Costa County, California
  - coordinates: 37°48′54″N 122°03′41″W
  - elevation: 2024ft
- Mouth: Upper San Leandro Reservoir
  - location: Contra Costa County, California
  - coordinates: 37°47′19.25″N 122°5′35.68″W
- Length: 3 m (9.8 ft)

Basin features
- River system: San Leandro Creek
- Landmarks: Rocky Ridge, California
- Tributaries
  - right: Callahan Creek

Kaiser Creek is an approximately 3 mile (4.8 km) long perennial creek in western Contra Costa and Alameda Counties, California, in the San Francisco Bay Area. It is a tributary of the Upper San Leandro Reservoir, part of the larger San Leandro Creek system.

== Course ==
Kaiser Creek begins as a number of springs and seeps along the crest of Rocky Ridge at an elevation of 2,024 feet (617 m) in the EBMUD San Leandro watershed. In its initial course, Kaiser Creek has a steep descent westward through a narrow canyon carved out of the Briones Sandstone. A series of waterfalls define the upper course of Kaiser Creek, where it has eroded through the uplift that forms Rocky Ridge.

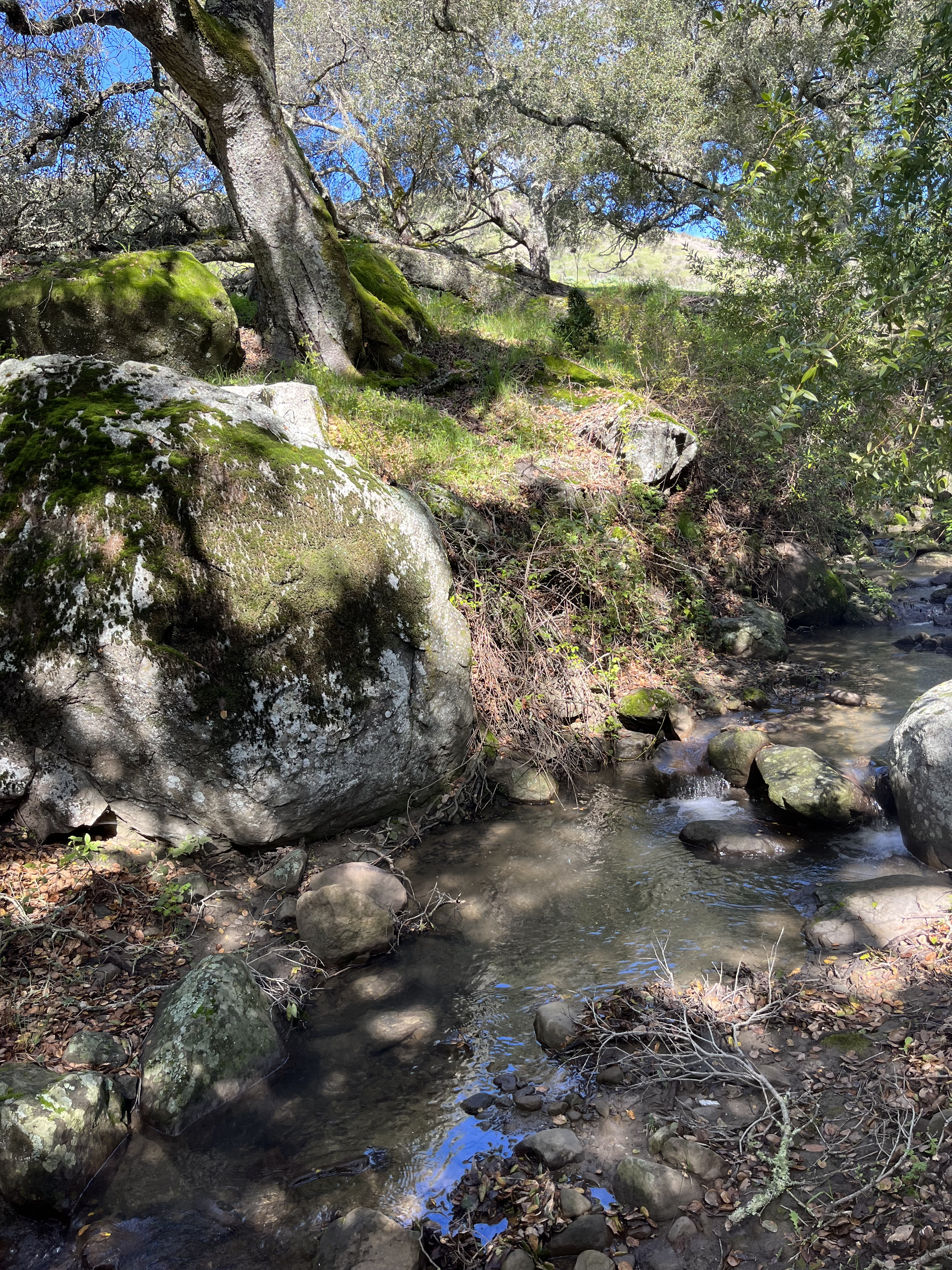
Callahan Creek is a major tributary of Kaiser Creek (March 11th, 2024)

It receives a named tributary, Callahan Creek, close to its headwaters.

After descending off of the ridge, it meanders westward through a forested valley for approximately 2 miles to its confluence with Buckhorn Creek at the Upper San Leandro Reservoir.

Historically, Kaiser Creek would have received Buckhorn Creek as a tributary and flowed for approximately one mile further before joining the main stem of San Leandro Creek which flows south and west, draining into San Francisco Bay at Arrowhead Marsh; but the construction of the Upper San Leandro Reservoir has seasonally inundated the confluence of these two creeks.

Kaiser Creek maintains a strong flow well into the dry season and rarely ceases to flow, unlike neighboring watersheds.

== Geography & Geology ==
=== Geography ===
Kaiser Creek has its source on Rocky Ridge in the Inner Coast Ranges, one of the highest and most prominent points in Contra Costa County, California. It soon crosses into Alameda County towards the rest of the San Leandro Creek watershed. Its catchment exhibits a character typical of many other headwater streams in the Inner Coast Ranges, with steep ridge topography intersected by numerous small valleys. Vegetation in the watershed is characteristic of much of the East Bay region, dominated by oak-laurel forests and grassland. The area has a Cool-summer mediterranean climate, modulated by frequent fogs from the Pacific Ocean.

Kaiser Creek is located in the East Bay Municipal Utilities District (EBMUD) Upper San Leandro Reservoir watershed, a 49 square mile area of protected land draining into the Upper San Leandro Reservoir. Access to the watershed is restricted by a permit system and visitors to the area are expected to abide by a set of guidelines put in place to preserve not only the watershed but the habitat contained within it.

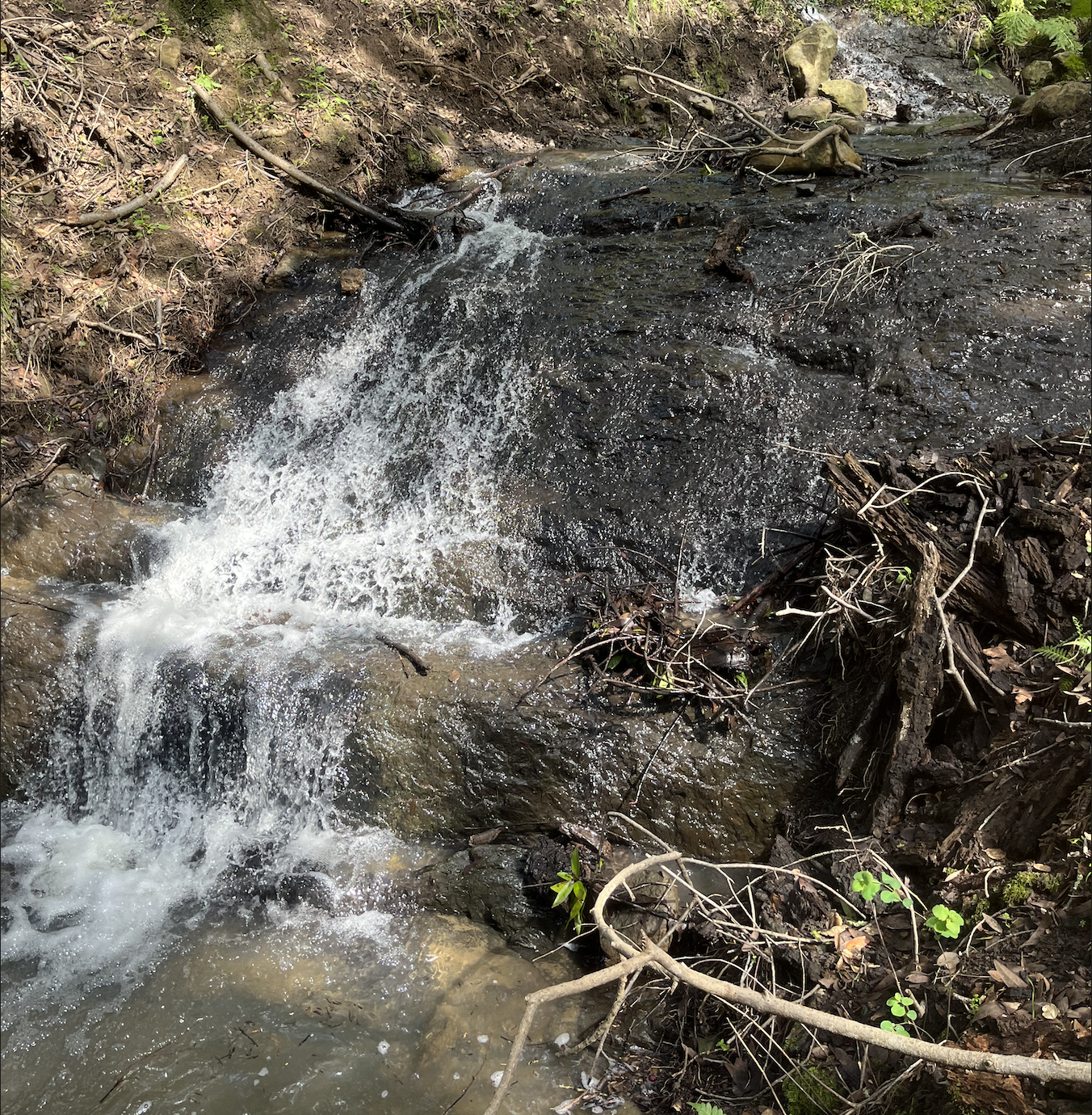
Kaiser Creek flowing over a localized occurrence of basalt (~9 ma), a very uncommon rock type east of the Berkeley Hills and more characteristic of the Orinda group's sister formation, the Petaluma group, now located over 20 miles north due to faulting. (March 11th, 2024)

A dirt road, Kaiser Creek road, follows the creek from Upper San Leandro Reservoir to Rocky Ridge Road, on Rocky Ridge. The road represents the only large-scale development in the Kaiser Creek watershed. Water is drawn from the upper reaches of the creek at certain times of year for the purpose of providing it to cattle. There are no towns or residential developments in the watershed, however the nearest town is Moraga, California and the residential communities located to the north.

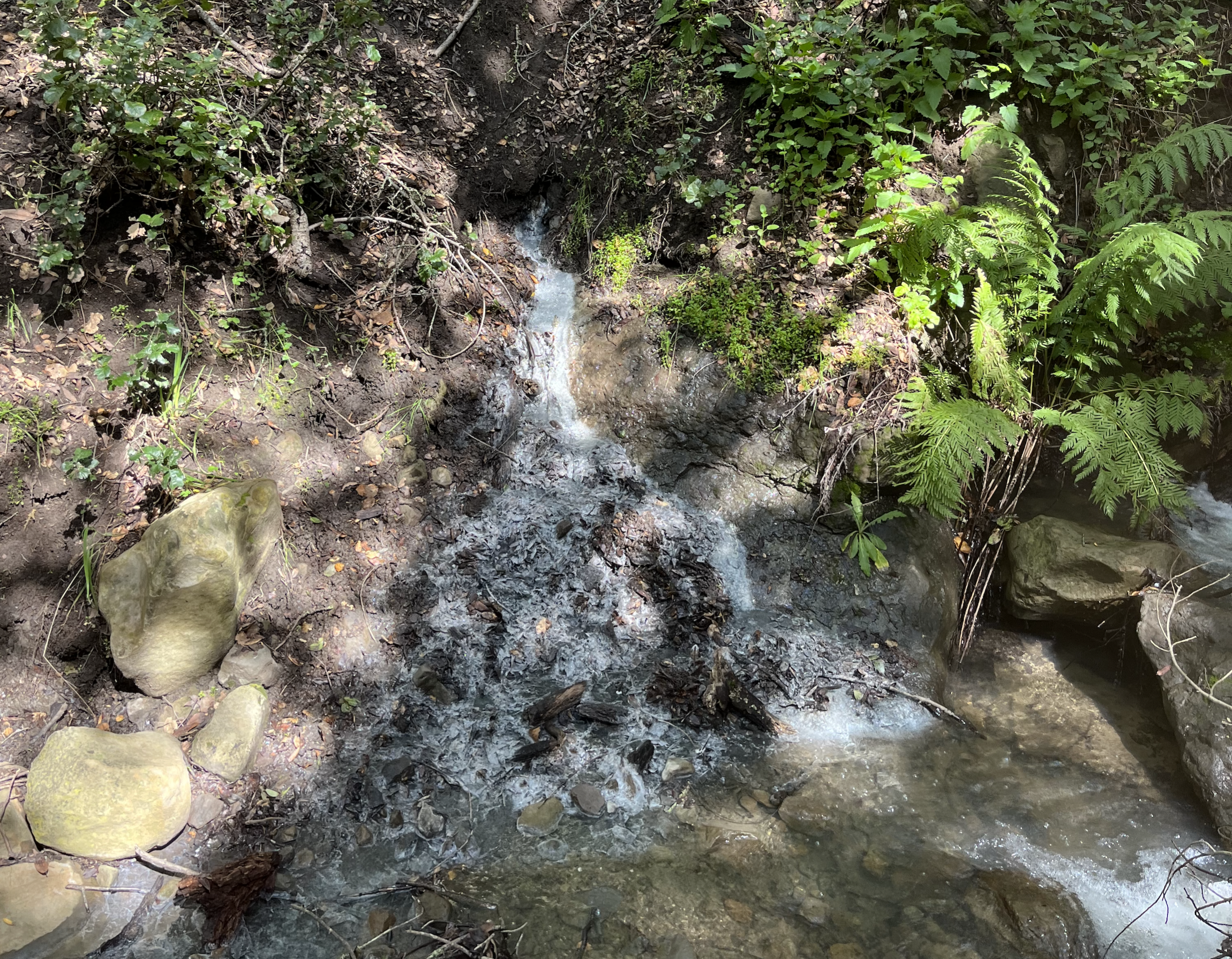
A spring of sulphur emits from the underside of an outcrop of Briones sandstone along Kaiser Creek, staining the surrounding soil white (March 11th, 2024)

=== Geology ===
Much of the rock in the Kaiser Creek watershed is relatively young and soft sandstone of the Briones group, as well as members of the Orinda group, mainly composed of sandstones, mudstones, conglomerates and a single occurrence of basalt underlying Kaiser Creek high in its course, dubbed the Kaiser Creek Basalt. All of the rock is dated from the late Miocene to the Pliocene (~10 Mya – 2.5 Mya)

The Kaiser Creek watershed lies in the area between the Hayward and Calaveras Faults and is thus subject to the intense compressional forces created as these two faults move past one another. This is evidenced by steeply-angled strata exposed throughout the creek's course, especially near its source. A number of springs are created by the active geologic setting and porous rock, which increase the flow of Kaiser Creek and sustain it through the dry season.

The steep valleys cut by Kaiser Creek and its tributaries are heavily filled with alluvial gravels and clays washed down from the surrounding hills.

The Kaiser Creek syncline transects the creek's course east of Upper San Leandro Reservoir, and is cut by numerous gulleys eroded through millennia of precipitation. The structure is additionally broken up by a number of transform faults which trend north to south through the area. The upper portion of the Kaiser Creek watershed is intersected by the Lafayette Fault, a minor transform fault that runs to the north and south associated with the Calaveras fault system.

== History ==
Kaiser Creek lies at the fringes of both historical Jalquin Ohlone and Saclan Bay Miwok territory. Kaiser Creek, like all watersources in California, was a deeply important place both materially and spiritually for native inhabitants of the area. Native groups used Kaiser Creek and its neighbors for fishing, bathing, cooking and processing seeds and nuts in bedrock mortars, staples of native Californian life.

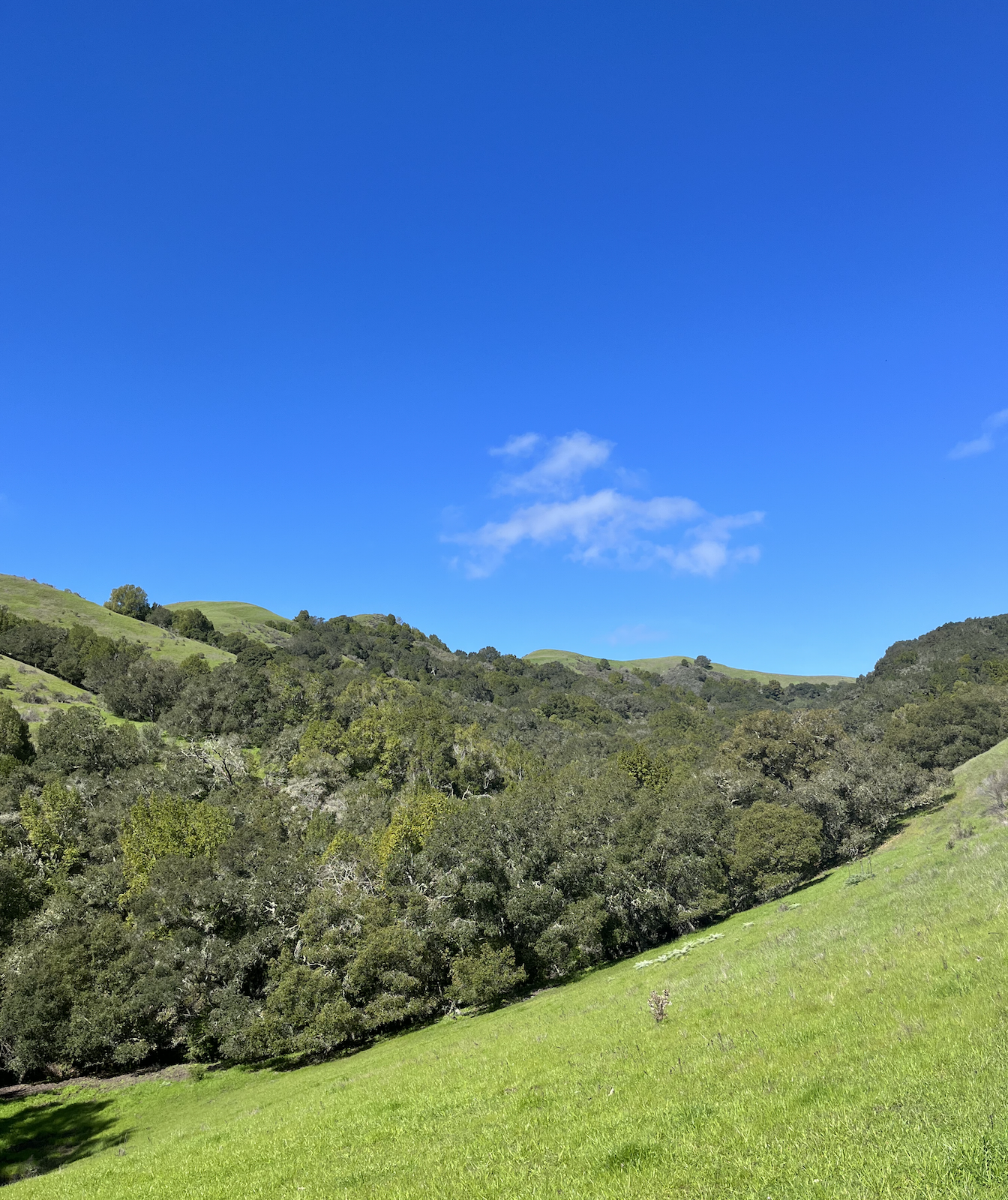
Topography and vegetation typical of the Kaiser Creek watershed. The rich array of habitats in the area would have drawn game and the area's native inhabitants alike (March 11th, 2024)

With perennial flows in most years, Kaiser Creek was an attractive place for native groups to erect permanent and temporary dwellings. Ample evidence of Native American occupation has been noted in the San Leandro Creek watershed, including bedrock mortars and other stonework, attesting to a continued native presence in the area for centuries. Sites such as these are priceless historical resources, and their locations are not revealed to the public to prevent looting or vandalism.

In the late 19th century, the Kaiser Creek watershed was subdivided and sold to homesteaders who used the small areas of alluvial soil along the valley bottom to farm fruits and vegetables. Cattle were and still are grazed in the meadows and grassy hills of the watershed.

In the early 20th century, in response to a rapidly-growing population, EBMUD began land acquisitions in Kaiser Creek and adjacent watersheds in order to begin work on the Upper San Leandro Reservoir. By 1926, water began filling behind the dam, inundating substantial areas of the lower Kaiser Creek watershed around its confluence with San Leandro Creek. The town of Valle Vista as well as former Native American habitation and food processing sites along Kaiser Creek were submerged following the construction of the dam.

In the 1980s and again in the 2000s, proposals for a new reservoir in the canyons of Buckhorn and Kaiser Creeks, called Buckhorn Reservoir, were reviewed and ultimately denied on account of heavy public opposition, potential environmental impacts and a lack of infrastructure in the area.

== Ecology ==
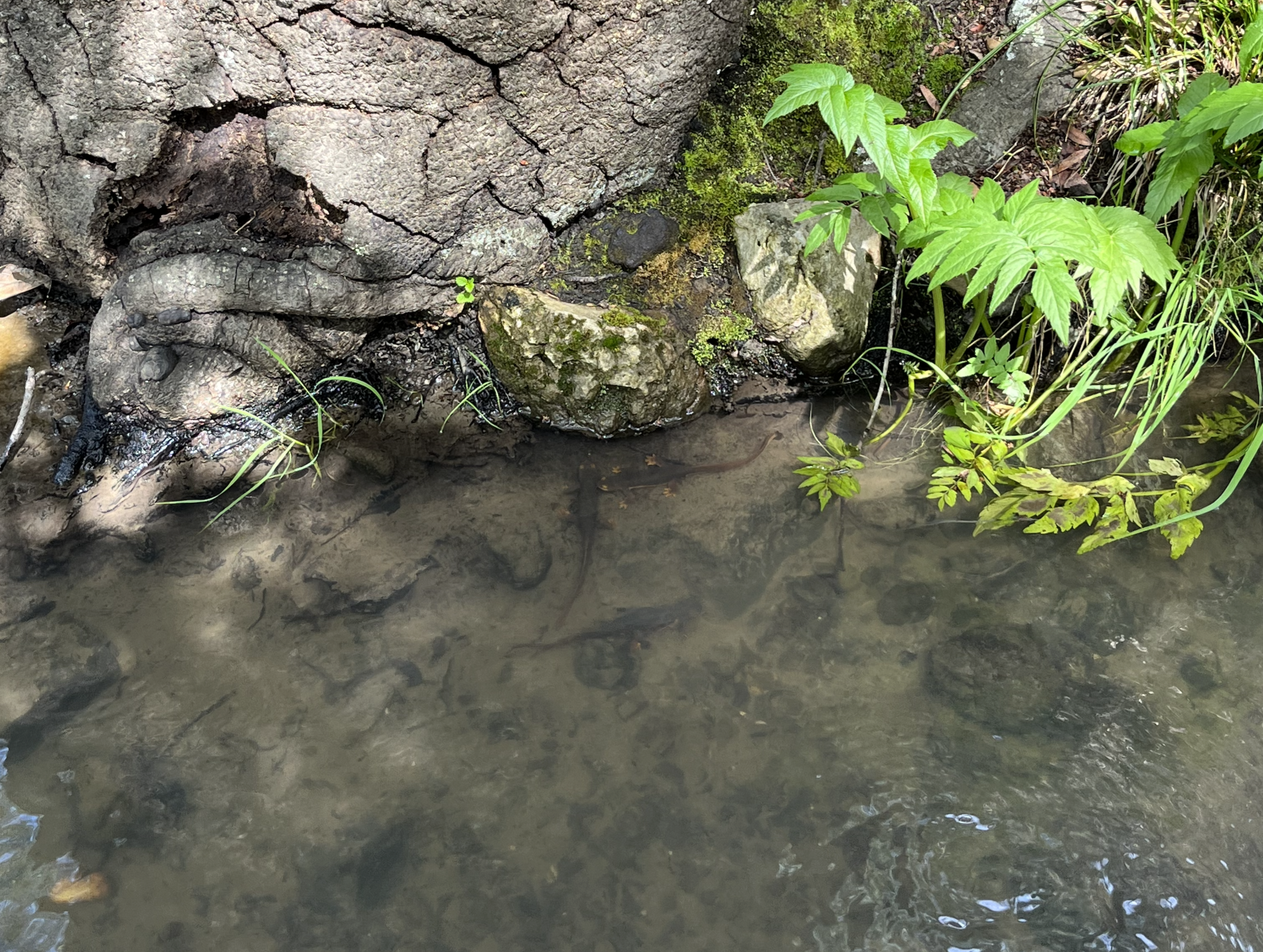
California newts, a threatened species, utilize the excellent habitat in Kaiser Creek for mating (March 11th, 2024)

Due to its isolated position deep in the East Bay Hills and its location within EBMUD watershed lands, Kaiser Creek has been spared from the ecological changes common among other streams in the Bay Area. It preserves a landscape and ecological community that is being rapidly destroyed by urban and suburban development. The largest human influence in the watershed is undoubtedly cattle grazing, which hinders the development of native perennial grasslands in favor of invasive annual grasslands, increases sedimentation in Kaiser Creek and reduces forage for native wildlife. Cattle grazing can be a useful tool in reducing excess vegetation during wildfire season, however.

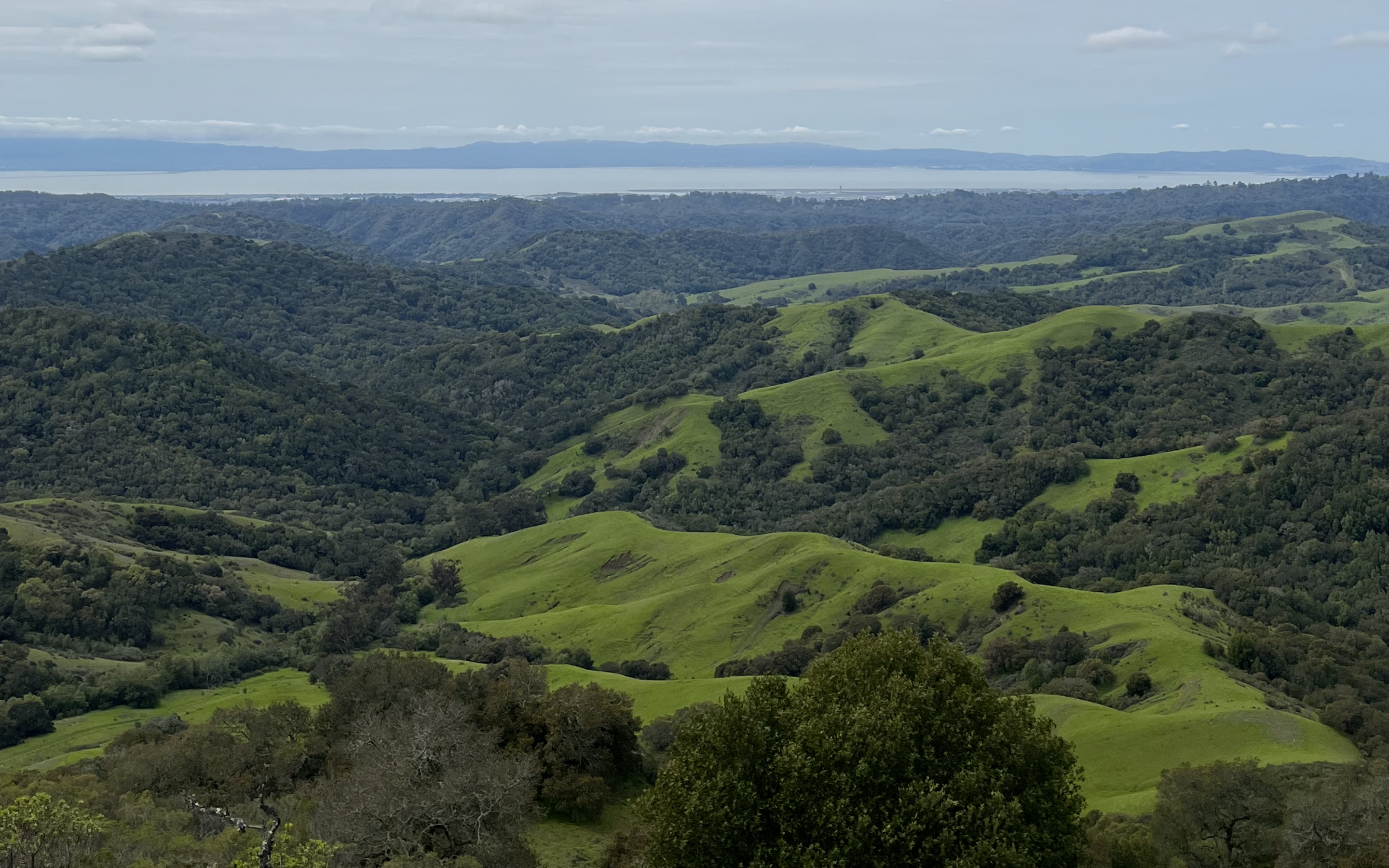
A view from Kaiser Creek's source on Rocky Ridge reveals much of its watershed and the San Francisco Bay beyond. A belt of alder trees lines its course out of the hills (April 8th, 2023)

Kaiser Creek flows through a steep canyon flanked by rounded hills covered in chaparral and woodlands. Dense forests of Coast live oak, Valley oak, California bay and California buckeye cover the shaded areas in the Kaiser Creek watershed while open grasslands predominate on exposed slopes. The creek and its tributaries are shaded by a variety of oaks and laurel, White alder and Arroyo willow. White alder in particular are the dominant streamside tree along much of Kaiser Creek. Higher elevation areas in the watershed on Rocky Ridge have extensive areas of chaparral and large outcrops of sandstone.

Because of the Kaiser Creek watershed's protected status, it is home to abundant wildlife including Black-tailed deer, Coyote, Cottontail rabbits, Bobcats and a variety of reptiles and amphibians including the Alameda whipsnake and California newt. The Northern Pacific Rattlesnake is the only venomous reptile native to the area.

Forests and prairies in the watershed are inhabited by a large and vocal population of songbirds and raptors like the Red-shouldered hawk. Rock outcrops high in the watershed provide nesting and roosting habitat for turkey vultures and a variety of other large birds.

=== Rainbow Trout Population ===
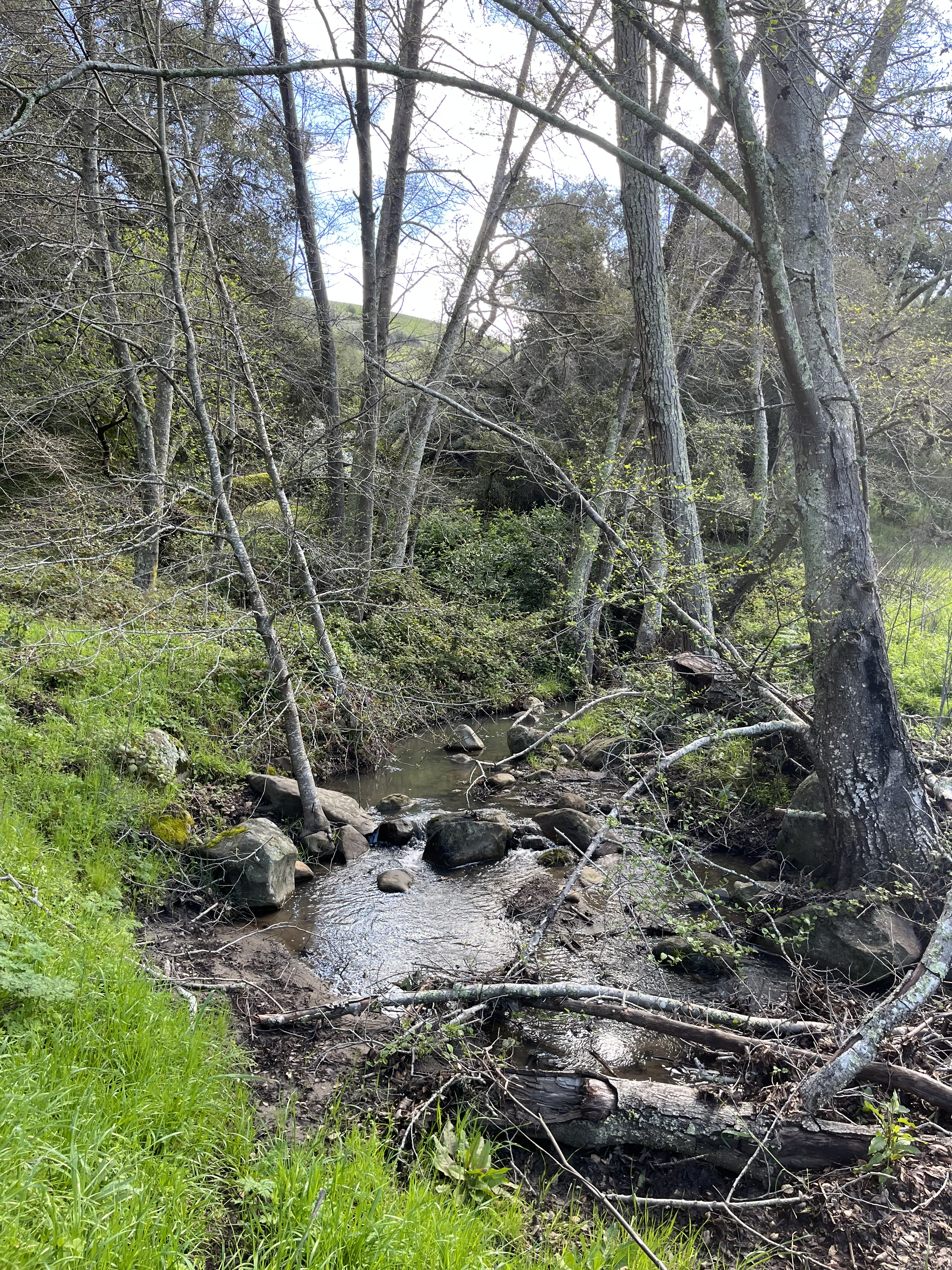
With cool, well-oxygenated perennial flow and ample shade provided by a native tree canopy, Kaiser Creek is a haven for rainbow trout through the hot, rainless summers in Central California and an attractive place for them to spawn in the winter (February 27th, 2024)

Kaiser Creek is unique among streams of the East Bay in that it retains a population of non-hybridized Coastal rainbow trout. As a result of rapid urbanization, drastic land use changes and a lack of understanding of local ecosystems in the 20th century, rainbow trout were extirpated from the majority of watersheds across the Bay Area. Kaiser Creek maintains ample flow through the dry season in most years, making it an exceptionally valuable resource for native trout.

A report conducted by the Center for Ecosystem Management and Restoration (CEMAR) on the present distribution of Steelhead in the streams of San Francisco Bay Area stated that:

"... O. mykiss (Rainbow Trout) from Redwood and Kaiser creeks represent a unique population of non-hybridized coastal rainbow trout that has been isolated from migrating steelhead for over 112 years (i.e., since construction of Chabot Dam in 1875)"

The rainbow trout in Kaiser Creek represent an incredibly rare and sensitive population of native, non-hatchery trout. Fishing or interfering with them in any way is strictly prohibited. Though studies have shown that Kaiser Creek is able to harbor mature trout over the summer dry period from May to November, persistent drought conditions and human interference in their habitat continue to threaten the population.

== See also ==
- San Leandro Creek
- Buckhorn Creek
- Rocky Ridge
- East Bay
- California Coast Ranges
- Saclan
- Ohlone
