= Buckhorn Creek (California) =

Creek in Central California

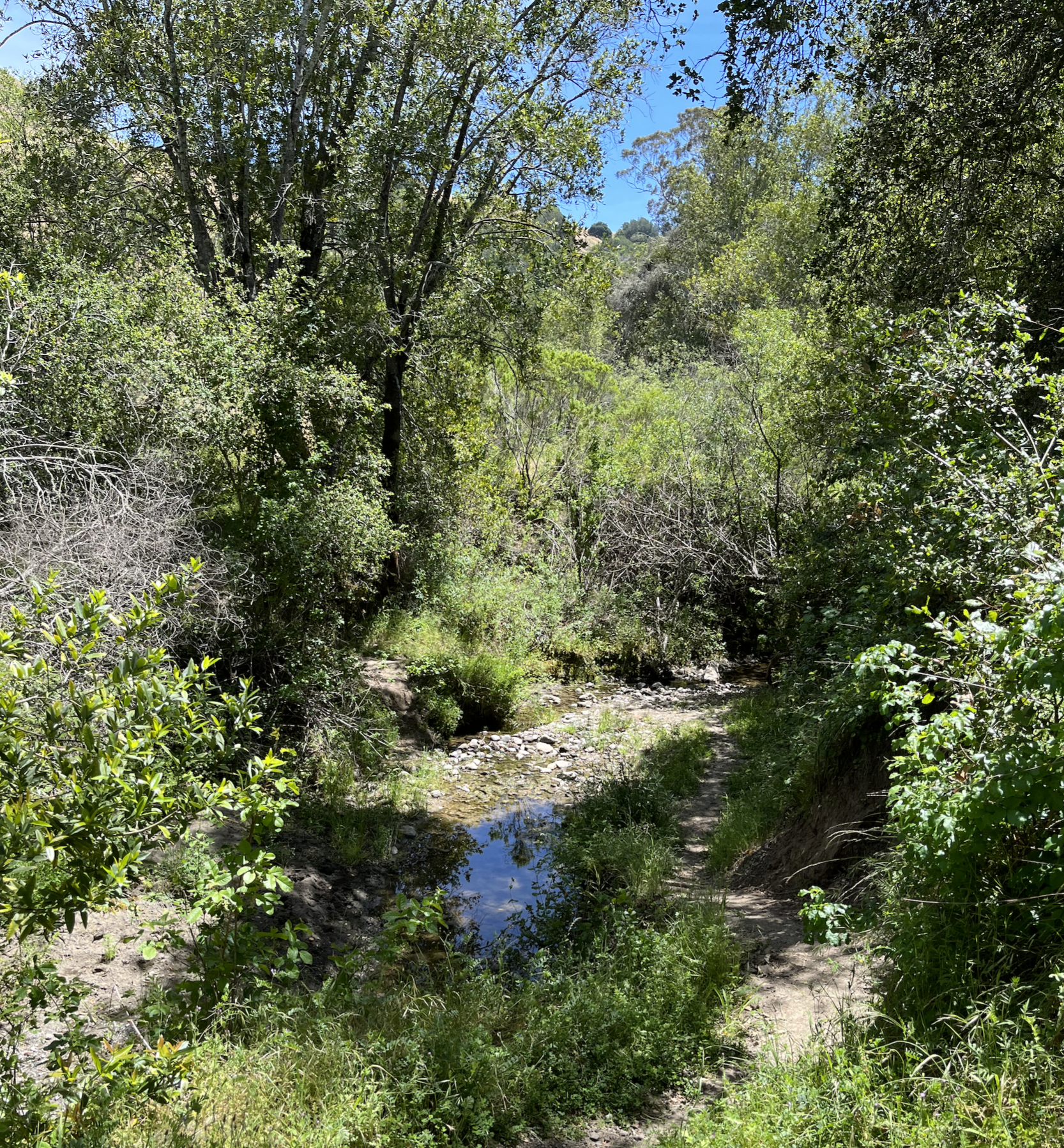
- Thick vegetation lines the banks of Buckhorn Creek for the entirety of its course out of the Berkeley Hills (May 19th, 2022)

Location
- Country: United States
- State: California
- Region: Bay Area
- District: Contra Costa County

Physical characteristics
- Mouth: Upper San Leandro Reservoir
  - coordinates: 37°47′18″N 122°05′39″W
- Length: ~2.1 miles

Basin features
- Cities: Moraga, California

Buckhorn Creek is a 2.1-mile-long creek in Contra Costa County, California, in the San Francisco Bay Area. It gets its name from the Buckhorn family who settled on the creek in the late 19th century.

== Course ==
Buckhorn Creek begins on the western slopes of Rocky Ridge in Western Contra Costa County at an elevation of 2,020 feet above sea level. It runs generally west off of Rocky Ridge before abruptly turning to the south where it runs for approximately 1.5 miles to its confluence with Kaiser creek at the Upper San Leandro Reservoir.

== History ==
The Buckhorn Creek watershed exists near the historical boundary between groups of the Ohlone people, who occupied much of the southern and eastern Bay Area and those of the Bay Miwok, who occupied the northern part of the East Bay and the region about Mount Diablo. For this reason, it is difficult to assert that Buckhorn creek was in the "territory" of any one group. Evidence of native activity in Buckhorn Creek canyon itself is sparse, though the area as a whole is rich in archaeological material. Because of its seasonal nature, Buckhorn Creek canyon was likely occupied temporarily by groups of hunters at favorable times, rather than permanently. Local native groups often established their main villages on larger and more consistent water sources like Las Trampas Creek, Lafayette Creek and San Leandro Creek, among many others.

== Geography ==
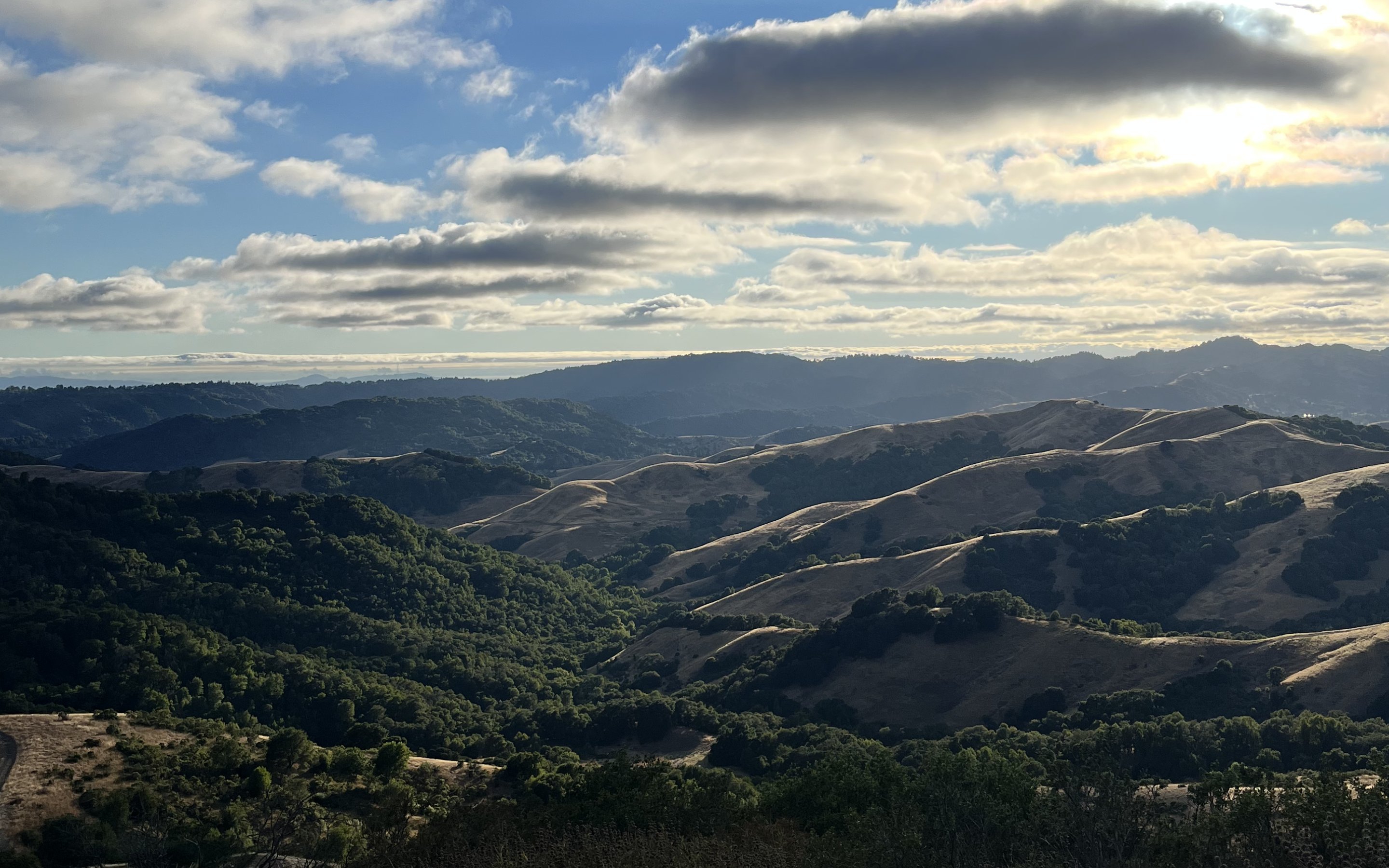
Looking down Buckhorn Creek Canyon from its source on Rocky Ridge. The region's steep terrain has precluded development in the catchment (July 6th, 2022)

Buckhorn Creek is a tributary to San Leandro Creek, one of the largest streams draining into the San Francisco Bay. It drains a small portion of the Berkeley Hills which are a subrange of the California Coast Ranges. The Buckhorn Creek watershed is characterized by the steep, rounded hills typical of much of the East Bay region. The climate of the area is classified as Cool-summer mediterranean, defined by wet winters and dry summers punctuated by frequent marine fogs.

Though there is little development in the Buckhorn Creek watershed besides fire roads, trails and ranching hardware, nearby communities include Moraga, California and the campus of Saint Mary's College of California. Buckhorn Creek is isolated by rugged terrain and a lack of development in much of the surrounding area.

The Buckhorn Creek watershed is entirely contained within the EBMUD San Leandro watershed, a nearly 50 square mile area of protected land surrounding the Upper San Leandro Reservoir, Lake Chabot and the area west of Rocky Ridge. Access to the Buckhorn Creek watershed is restricted by a permit system. Buckhorn Creek is managed to ensure clean and unpolluted inflow to the Upper San Leandro Reservoir, which is a major source of drinking water for the area's dense population. The creek can be reached via hiking trail at access points at Rancho Laguna Park and Saint Mary's College.

== Ecology ==
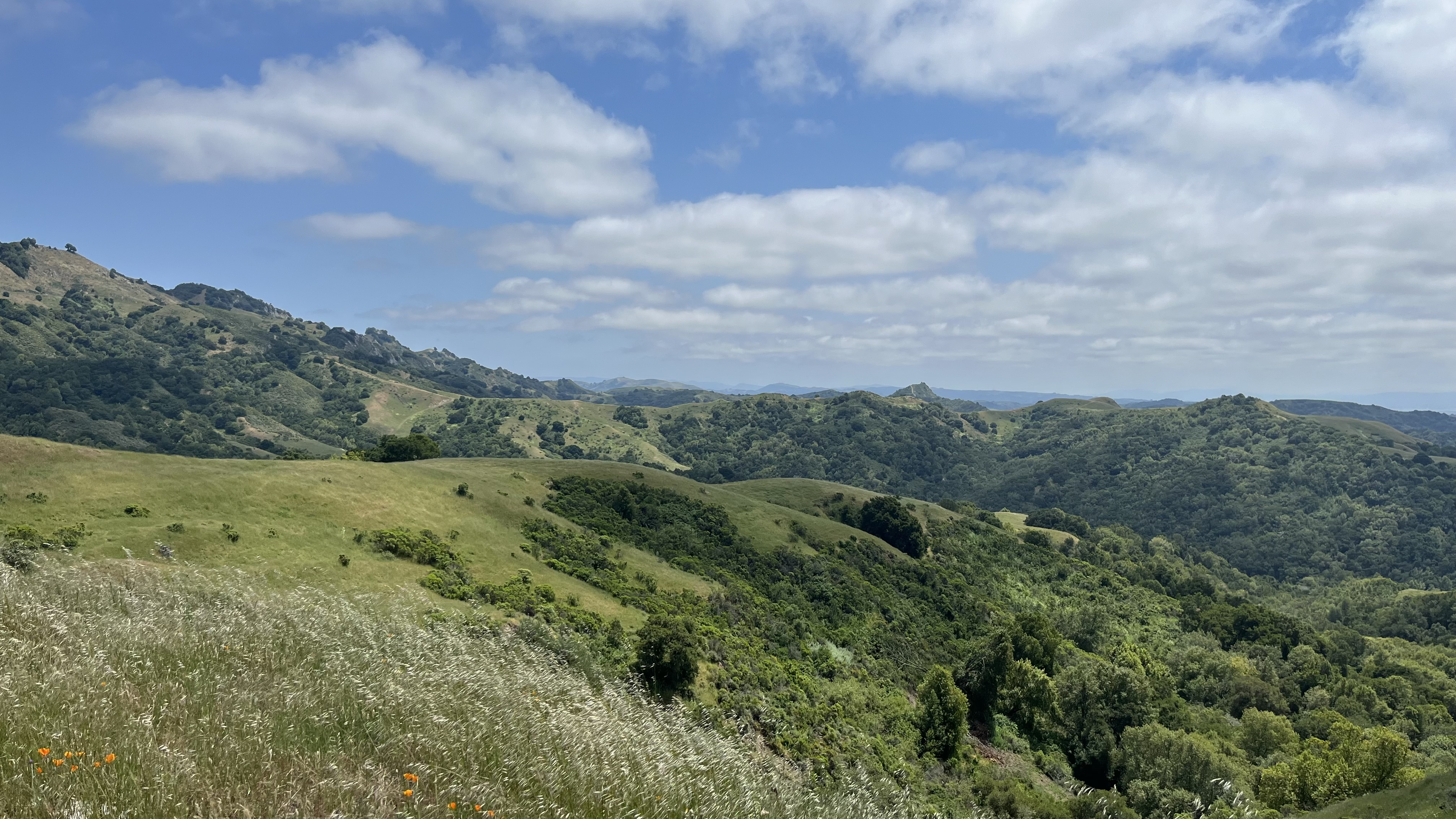
A varied landscape of California mixed evergreen forest, Chaparral and grassland in Buckhorn Creek Canyon. Buckhorn Creek sits at the edge of one of the largest stretches of undeveloped land left in the Bay Area. (May 22nd, 2023)

Despite originating in Contra Costa County, home to 1.61 million people, 1,626 per square mile, Buckhorn Creek is almost entirely undeveloped and protected from its source to its outlet. This makes it unique among the streams of the Bay Area, one of California's most densely populated regions with over 7 million people.

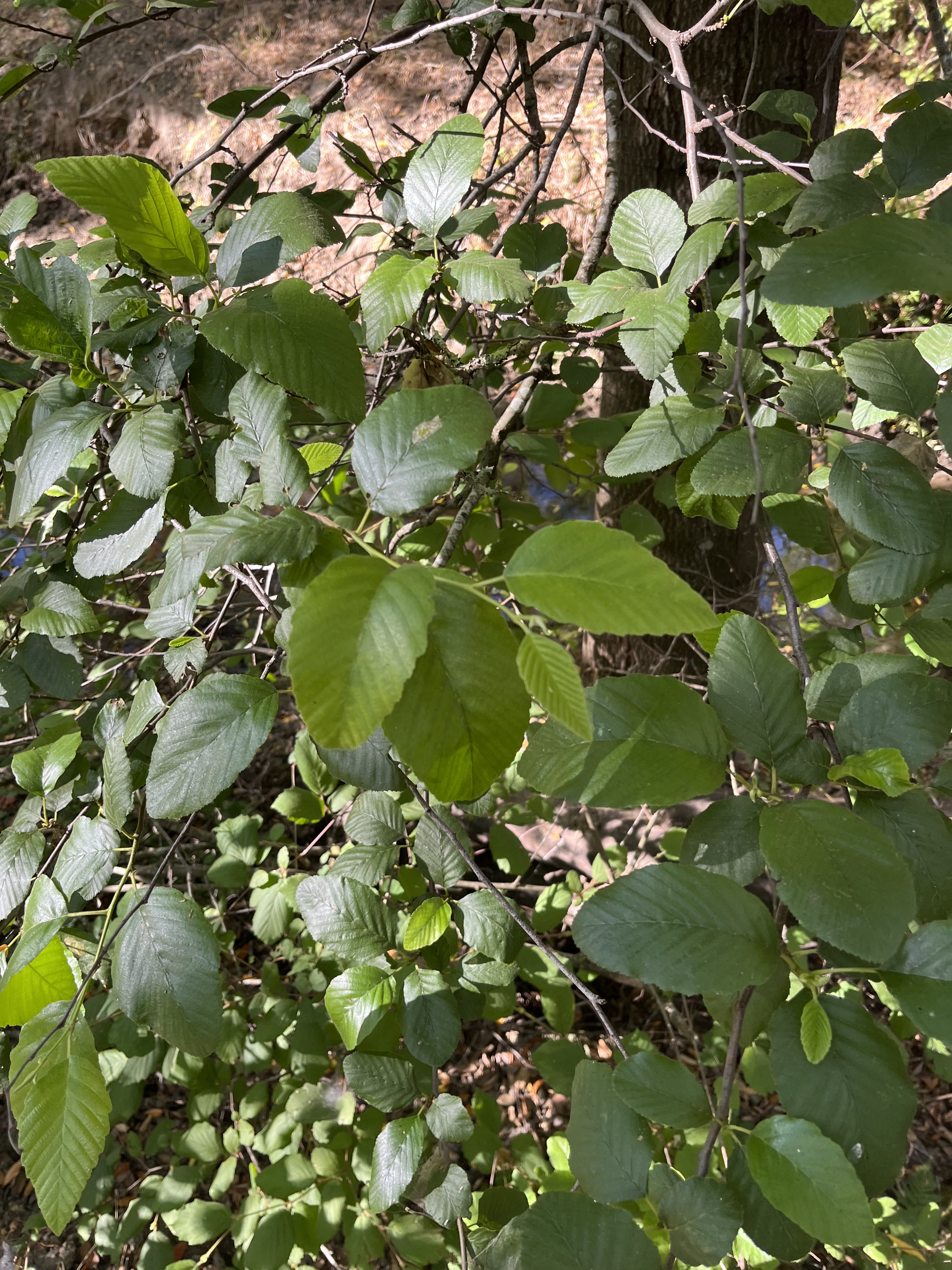
White Alder (Alnus rhombifolia) growing along Buckhorn Creek (July 6th, 2022)

A large proportion of the streams draining into the San Francisco Estuary have undergone significant habitat degradation as a result of the intensive residential and industrial development undertaken in the region in the last century. Buckhorn Creek, however, is unaffected by residential or industrial development and exhibits much more intact habitat than many other streams in the region. Mixed forests of mature Valley oak, Coast Live oak, Black oak, California buckeye and California Bay dominate much of the watershed's lower elevation areas while annual grasslands and chaparral cover the rugged hilltops and exposed slopes.

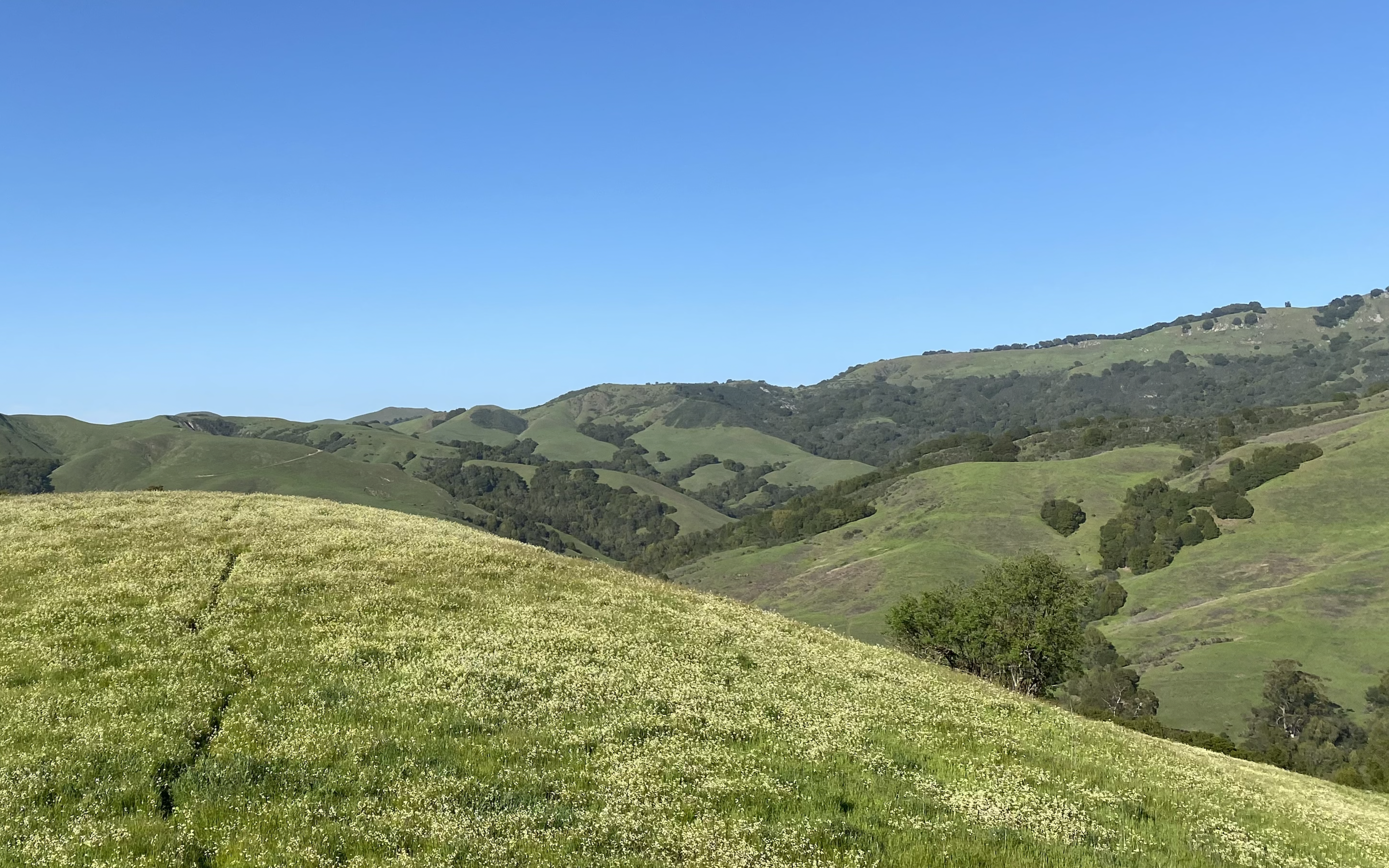
Wildflowers blooming on the hills above Buckhorn Creek with Rocky Ridge rising in the background (April 6th, 2021)

Buckhorn Creek's flow is heavily dependent on rainfall and can become greatly diminished during the dry period from June to November. During droughts there may only be water in pools in some sections of the stream.

Riparian vegetation along the creek includes arroyo willow, white alder and Fremont cottonwood.

Buckhorn Creek is a crucial source of water for the vibrant wildlife communities inhabiting the area. The creek supports numerous species of birds, both migratory and resident. Great horned owl and Screech owl are commonly seen in the evenings near the creek. Black-tailed deer, coyotes, bobcats, gray foxes and cottontail rabbit among many other species live in the Buckhorn Creek watershed.

In the 1980s and again in the 2000s, in response to persistent drought conditions, proposals were submitted to expand the East Bay's water storage capacity by inundating Buckhorn Creek and Kaiser Creek in what was to be called the "Buckhorn Reservoir". The reservoir would have had a capacity of 143,000 acre-feet and would have inundated the majority of both valleys and all of the habitat contained therein. Fierce opposition from both environmentalist groups and members of the local community caused EBMUD to shelf the project.

=== Rainbow trout population ===
Buckhorn Creek supports a population of native Coastal rainbow trout in years where there is enough flow to support the fish over the dry summer season. The Central California Coast Steelhead DPS is federally listed as threatened as a result of habitat loss and degradation, as well as the widespread installation of migration barriers. Rainbow trout migrate from Upper San Leandro Reservoir to Buckhorn Creek to spawn during periods of high water. They have been observed in the lower and upper reaches of the creek on multiple occasions between the 1970s and early 2000s. However, due to its relative low flow and poor instream substrate for spawning, Buckhorn Creek has limited value to trout restoration.

== See also ==
- Rocky Ridge
- Kaiser Creek
- East Bay
