= Upper San Leandro Reservoir =

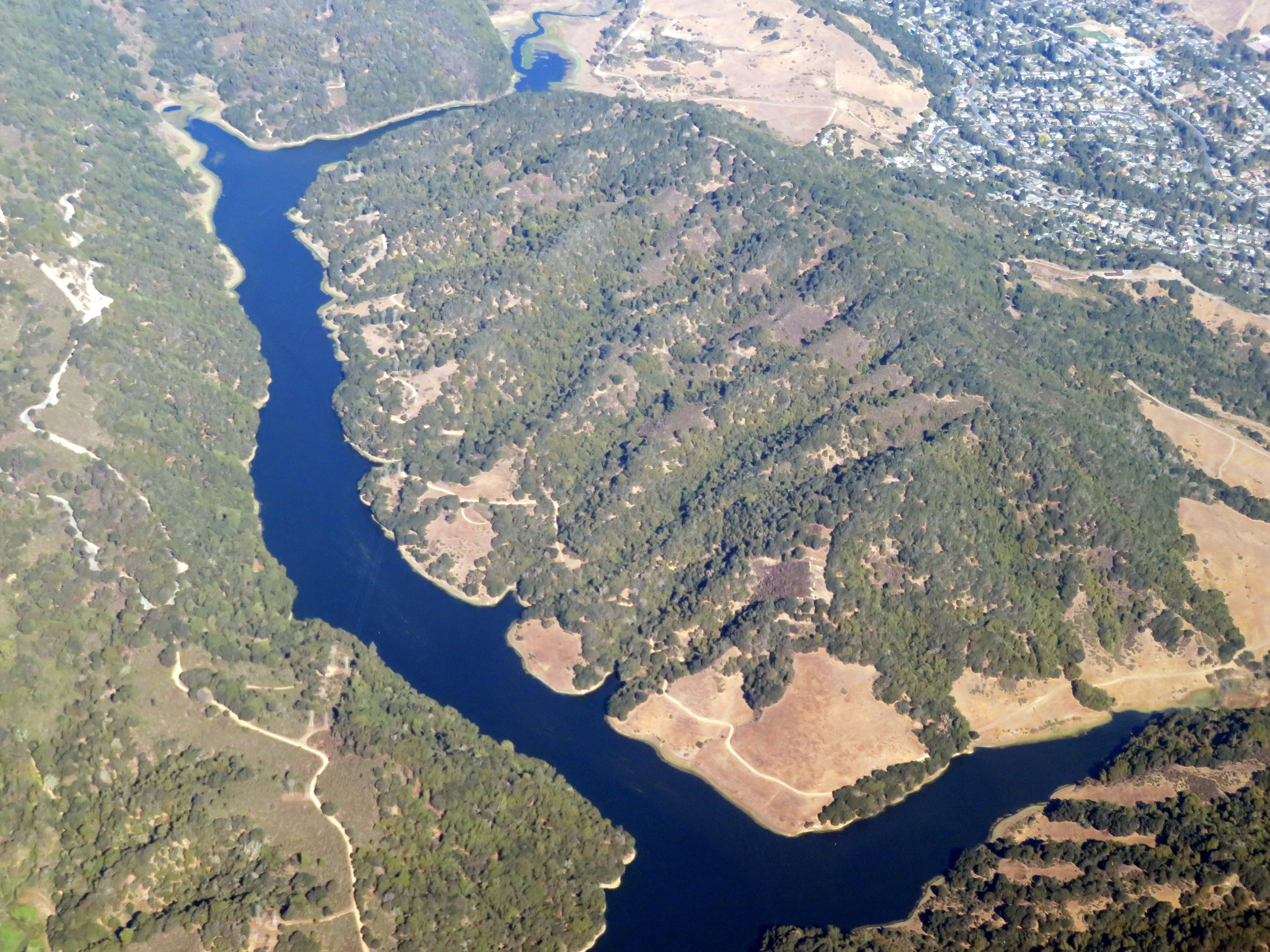
- Aerial view of part of the reservoir in 2020

- Location within California
- Location: San Leandro, California
- Coordinates: 37°46′33″N 122°07′03″W
- Primary outflows: San Leandro Creek
- Catchment area: 21.5 mi^{2} (56 km^{2})
- Managing agency: East Bay Municipal Utility District
- First flooded: 1926
- Max. length: 6 mi (9.7 km)
- Surface area: 620 acres (250 ha)
- Water volume: 42,000 acre⋅ft (52,000,000 m^{3})
- Surface elevation: 459 ft (140 m)

Upper San Leandro Reservoir is an artificial lake in Alameda County and Contra Costa County, California which provides water for the East Bay Municipal Utility District (EBMUD). It is impounded by the earth-filled San Leandro Dam on San Leandro Creek, located at the southeast end of the lake.

Although it receives some runoff from its local watershed, most of the water is imported via the Mokelumne Aqueduct. The reservoir has a capacity of about 42,000 acre-feet (52,000,000 m^{3}), though its normal volume is about 30,250 acre-feet (37,310,000 m^{3}). The reservoir name includes "Upper" to distinguish it from Lake Chabot, several miles downstream, which was originally known as "Lower San Leandro Reservoir".

== Original dam ==
The reservoir was originally formed in 1926 when the first San Leandro Dam was completed, and it was first filled by the Mokelumne Aqueduct in 1929. It inundated a long section of the San Leandro Creek valley, including the towns of Valle Vista and Redwood. The original dam was constructed between 1924 and 1926 using the hydraulic fill method and was considered seismically inadequate.

== New dam ==
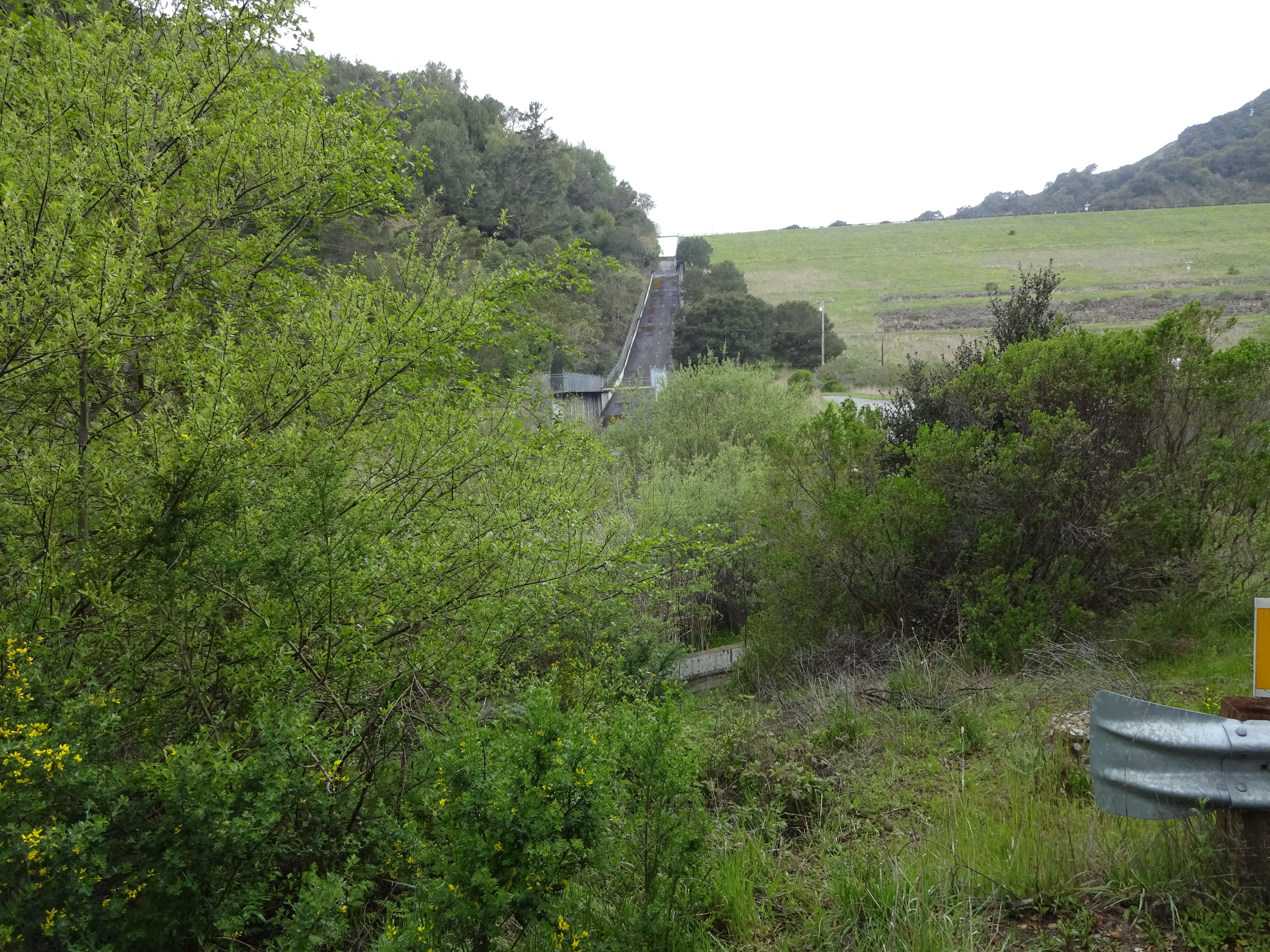
Dam constructed in 1977, with the spillway toward the left. The earth-filled dam is green because it is covered with grass.

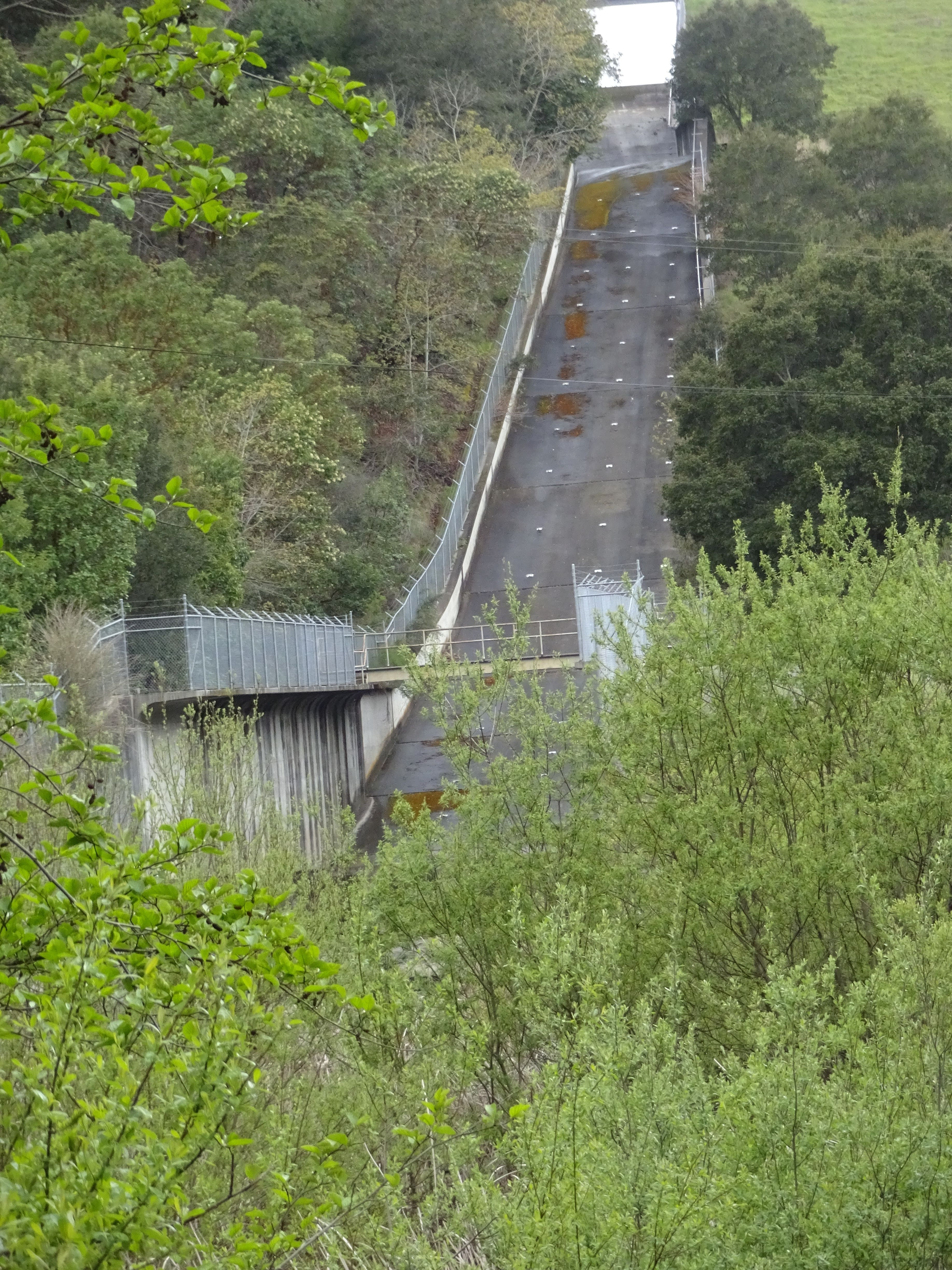
Spillway constructed in 1977

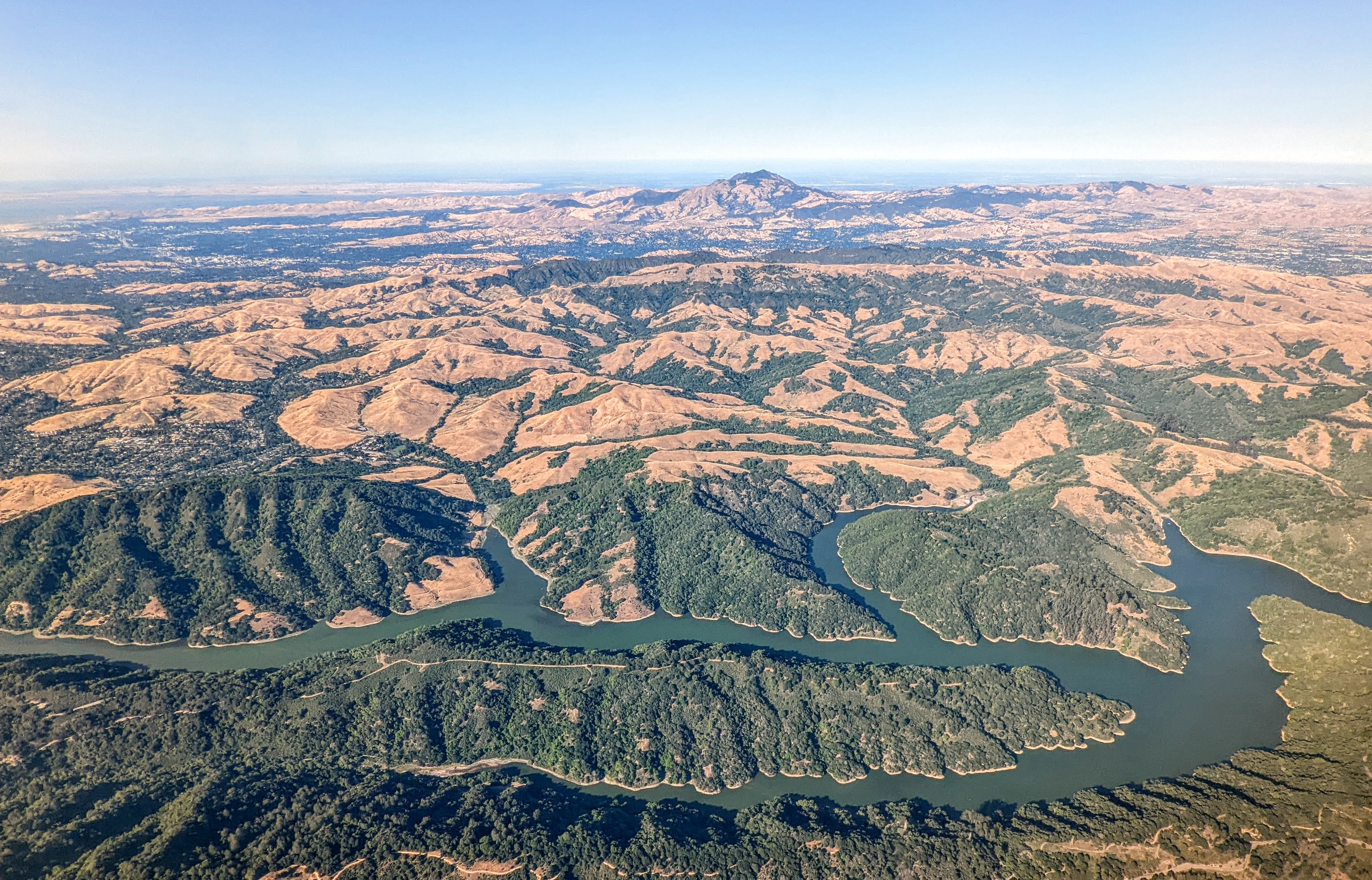
Aerial view with several branches of the reservoir

A new earth-filled dam was constructed in 1977, directly downstream of the old one, to provide protection against earthquakes. The new dam is 182 feet (55 m) high and 1,300 feet (400 m) long, containing 88,890 cubic yards (67,960 m^{3}) of material.

Tributaries that flow into the lake include San Leandro, Moraga, King Canyon, Kaiser, Buckhorn and Redwood Creeks. The reservoir and its feeder streams have a population of landlocked rainbow trout whose migration to San Francisco Bay was blocked by the dam.

The reservoir is closed to boating and fishing, in order to protect water quality. However, there is a public trail system surrounding the lake.

== See also ==
- List of dams and reservoirs in California
