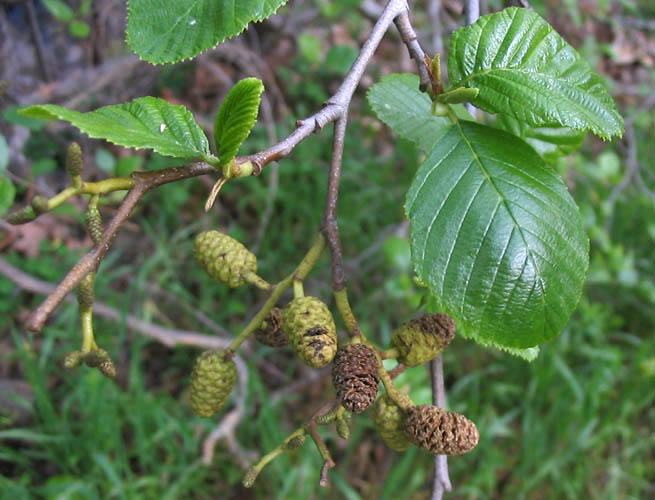
- Foliage and fruit

Conservation status
- Least Concern (IUCN 3.1)

Scientific classification
- Kingdom: Plantae
- Clade: Embryophytes
- Clade: Tracheophytes
- Clade: Angiosperms
- Clade: Eudicots
- Clade: Rosids
- Order: Fagales
- Family: Betulaceae
- Genus: Alnus
- Subgenus: Alnus subg. Alnus
- Species: A. rhombifolia

Binomial name
- Alnus rhombifolia Nutt.
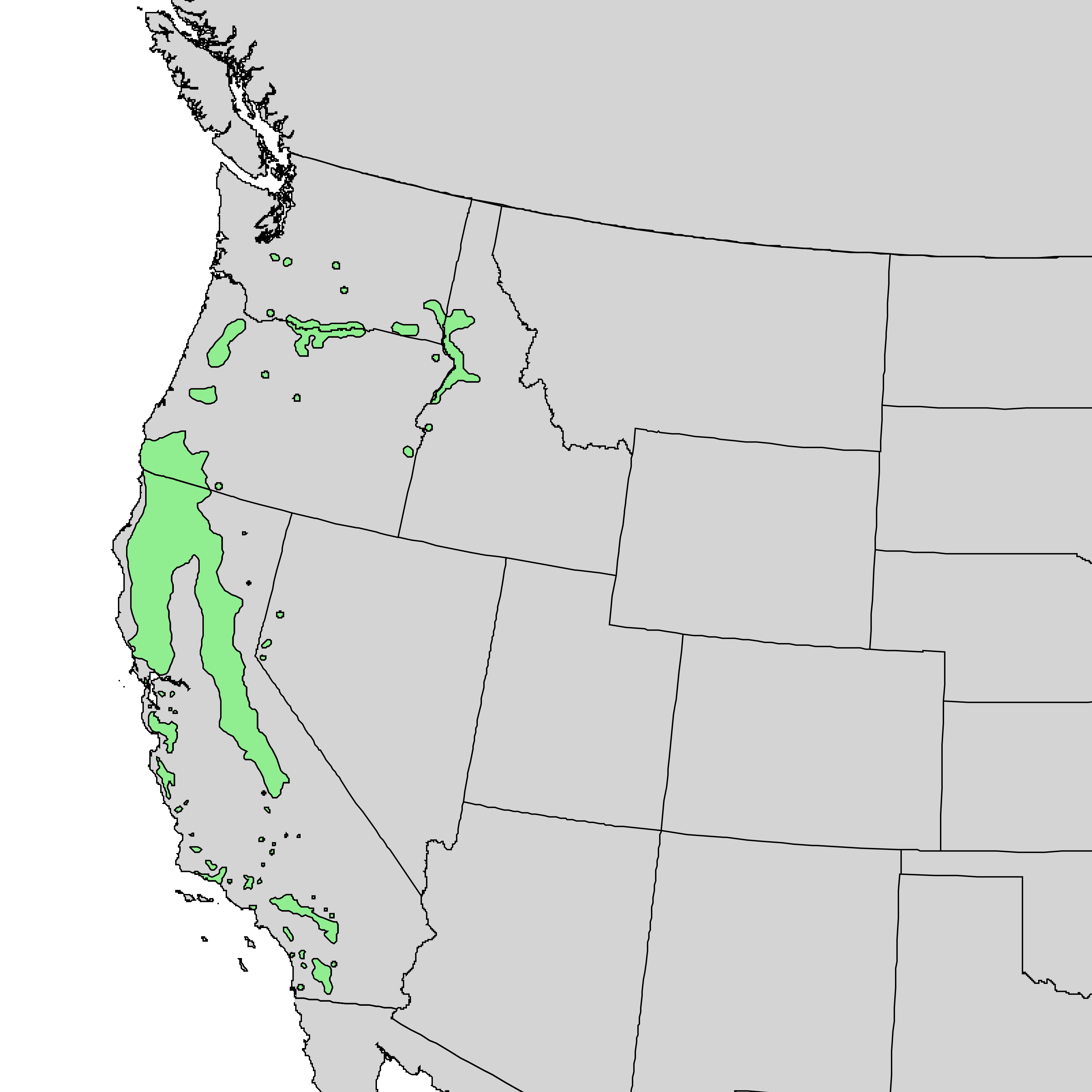
- Natural range of Alnus rhombifolia

Synonyms
- Alnus californica (Regel) H.J.P.Winkl.; Alnus glutinosa lusus californica Regel; Alnus rhombifolia var. bernardina Munz & I.M.Johnst.; Alnus rhombifolia var. ovalis H.J.P.Winkl.; Alnus rhombifolia var. typica Callier, not validly publ.

= Alnus rhombifolia =

White alder

Species of tree

Alnus rhombifolia, the white alder, is an alder tree native to western North America, from British Columbia and Washington east to western Montana, southeast to the Sierra Nevada, and south through the Peninsular Ranges and Colorado Desert oases in Southern California. It occurs in riparian zone habitats at an elevational range of 100–2,400 metres (330–7,870 ft). While not reported in northern Baja California, it has been predicted on the basis of its climatic adaptation to occur there also. Alnus rhombifolia is primarily found in the chaparral and woodlands, montane, and temperate forests ecoregions.

== Description ==
Alnus rhombifolia is a medium-sized deciduous tree growing to 15–25 metres (49–82 ft) (rarely to 35 metres (115 ft)) tall, with pale gray bark, smooth on young trees, becoming scaly on old trees. The leaves are alternate, rhombic to narrow elliptic, 4–10 centimetres (1.6–3.9 in) long and 2–5 centimetres (0.79–1.97 in) broad, with a finely serrated margin and a rounded to acute apex; they are thinly hairy below.

The flowers are produced in catkins. The male catkins are pendulous, slender, 3–10 centimetres (1.2–3.9 in) long, yellowish, and produced in clusters of two to seven; pollination is in early spring, before the leaves emerge. The female catkins are ovoid, when mature in autumn 10–22 millimetres (0.39–0.87 in) long and 7–10 millimetres (0.28–0.39 in) broad, on a 1–10 millimetres (0.039–0.394 in) stem, superficially resembling a small conifer cone. The small winged seeds disperse through the winter, leaving the old woody, blackish 'cones' on the tree for up to a year after.

The white alder is closely related to the red alder (Alnus rubra), differing in the leaf margins being flat, not curled under. Like other alders, it is able to fix nitrogen, and tolerates infertile soils.

== Uses ==
=== Wood ===
Chumash people used white alder for its wood; however, it appears to have been used less in woodworking than oak and sycamore wood. Anthropologist and ethnobiologist Jan Timbrook noted that "many published references to uses of 'alder tree' probably derive from the use of a Spanish dictionary to translate the word aliso," which actually referred to sycamores in California. Pedro Fages reported during an early Spanish expedition into Alta California that the Chumash made wooden platters from the roots of oak and alder trees. Ethnologist J. P. Harrington's consultants reported that alder wood was used to make bowls, trays and spoons. The spoons were described to be about a foot long, with straight handles and round, hollowed bowls.

Timbrook also noted that the Chumash word used for white alder, mow, "was also applied to a kind of sugar called panocha de carrizo which was traded by the Yokuts," made from native Phragmites australis.

=== Dye ===
Alder bark was used to make dye. In northern California, alder bark dye was used as a colorant for woodwardia ferns used in baskets by indigenous people like the Yurok, Karuk, and Hupa. The Ohlone also used the bark as a dye and are also reported to have consumed the inner bark. Chumash people dyed cordage by soaking it in a bark solution for a day and a night. A bright orange dye was produced by the Maidu by chewing the bark; the salivary enzymes may have helped set the dye.

=== Medicinal ===
Some Plateau Indian tribes use white alder for female health treatment needs. Alder-bark tea was reportedly used by some California indigenous people for medicinal purposes.
