= San Leandro Creek =

San Leandro Creek Arroyo de San Leandro, Rio San Leandro
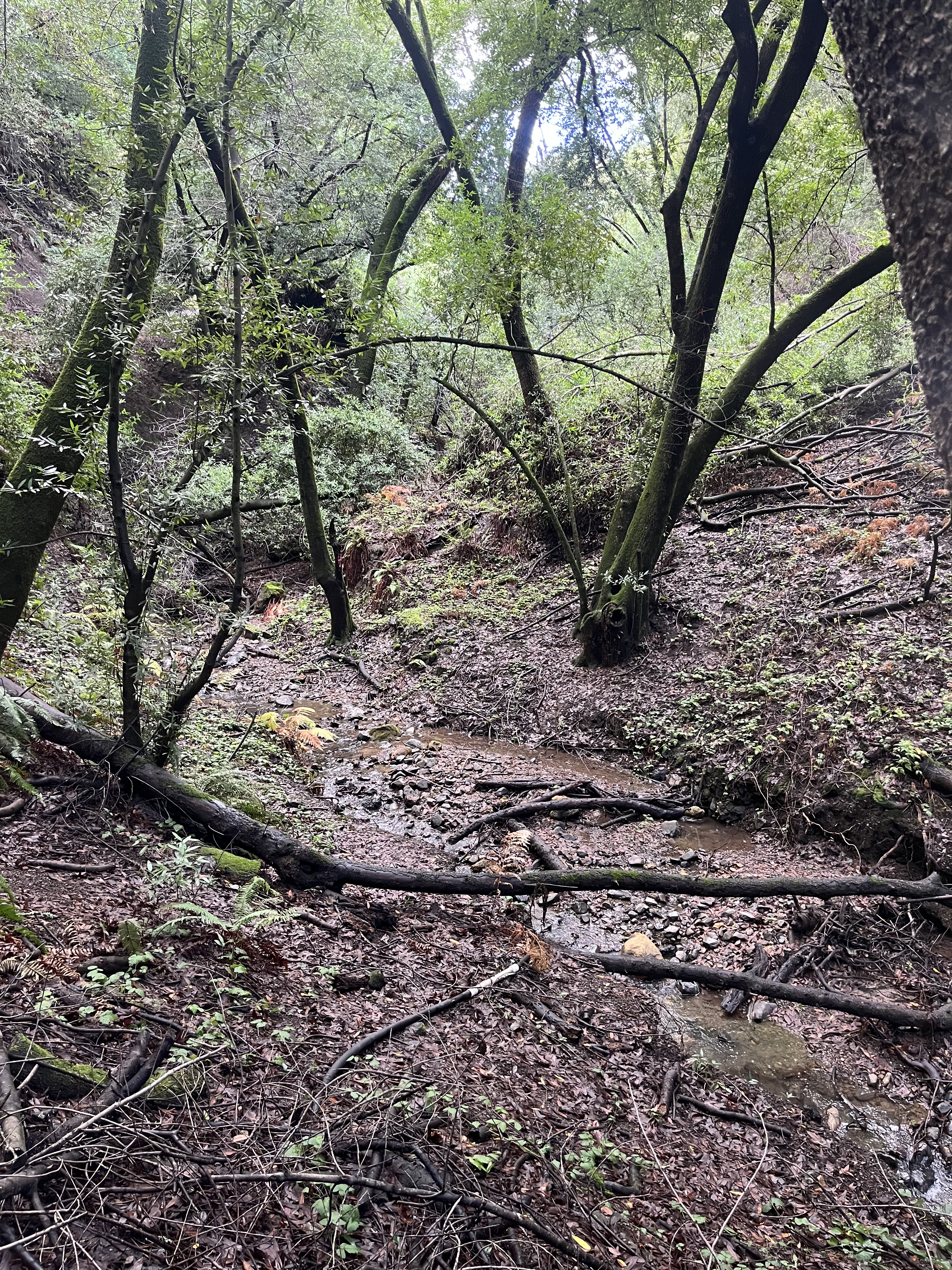
- The upper watershed of San Leandro Creek is densely forested and rugged, in contrast with its highly-urbanized lower reaches (January 3rd, 2023)

- Location of the mouth of San Leandro Creek in California
- Etymology: Spanish

Location
- Country: United States
- State: California
- Region: Alameda County, Contra Costa County
- City: San Leandro, California

Physical characteristics
- Source
  - location: east of Oakland, California
  - coordinates: 37°50′47″N 122°11′43″W
  - elevation: 1,140 ft (350 m)
- Mouth: San Francisco Bay
  - location: Oakland, California, just north of Oakland International Airport
  - coordinates: 37°44′34″N 122°12′28″W
  - elevation: 0 ft (0 m)

Basin features
- Tributaries
  - left: Indian Creek, Moraga Creek, Buckhorn Creek, Kaiser Creek, Miller Creek
  - right: Redwood Creek, Grass Valley Creek

San Leandro Creek (Spanish: Arroyo de San Leandro) is a 21.7-mile-long (34.9 km) year-round natural stream in the hills above Oakland in Alameda County and Contra Costa County of the East Bay in northern California.

== Geography ==
It flows along the east face of the hills, east of Oakland and San Leandro. It runs into Upper San Leandro Reservoir and then Lake Chabot, both reservoirs are North of the unincorporated town of Castro Valley. It then flows through the city of San Leandro, and after crossing Hegenberger Road just north of Oakland International Airport on into San Leandro Bay of San Francisco Bay.

== Watershed ==
The San Leandro Creek watershed drains 49.4 square miles (128 km^{2}). Although the creek is channeled and culverted in places, it is remarkable among East Bay streams for being mostly uncovered throughout most of its course. It is joined by Indian Creek, and then at Upper San Leandro Reservoir it is joined by Moraga Creek, Redwood Creek, Buckhorn Creek and Kaiser Creek, then just below the spillway by Miller Creek. At Lake Chabot in Anthony Chabot Regional Park it is joined by Grass Valley Creek, then descends to San Leandro Bay.

The Redwood Creek tributary is protected by Redwood Regional Park, which contains the largest remaining natural stand of coast redwood (Sequoia sempervirens) found in the East Bay.

The creek terminates in Arrowhead Marsh in Oakland, one of the few marshlands left in the East Bay. The marsh formed in San Leandro Bay between 1855 and 1895 from sediments washed down San Leandro Creek during construction of the Lake Chabot dam and also from the logging of the San Antonio Forest.

== History ==
Rainbow trout species identified
- Interactive map of Rainbow trout species identified
- Location: 50 yards past Redwood Gate entrance kiosk, Redwood Regional Park

California Historical Landmark
- Designated: 1986
- Reference no.: 970

San Leandro Creek was formerly named Arroyo de San Leandro, likely named by the Spanish for St. Leander, 6th-century archbishop of Seville, "Apostle of the Goths". It was crossed by El Camino Viejo, now State Route 185.

The creek is known for having been the site of the first rainbow trout hatchery in the world, drawing on the locally native variety of the species. The fish raised in this hatchery were sent as far away as New York. Although rainbow trout (Oncorhynchus mykiss), was initially identified in 1792 in Kamchatka, Siberia by Johann Julius Walbaum, William P. Gibbons, founder of the California Academy of Sciences, believed in 1855 that he had discovered a new species of trout in San Leandro Creek, which he named Salmo iridea (now the coastal rainbow trout subspecies Oncorhynchus mykiss irideus). The site was then declared a California Historical Landmark.

In 1874 work began on Lake Chabot Dam and it was completed in 1875, forming a 315-acre (127 ha) lake. Lake Chabot serves as a standby emergency water supply but was opened to limited recreation in the 1960s. Four miles upstream, a second dam built in 1926 formed San Leandro Reservoir.

== Ecology ==
It sustains the redwood groves in the unincorporated town of Canyon, California and was formerly lined with numerous oaks and willows in its lower course.

Physical evidence indicates that Chinook salmon (Oncorhynchus tshawytscha) historically spawned in four San Francisco Bay Area watersheds, San Leandro Creek in Alameda County, Walnut Creek, Alameda Creek, and San Leandro Creek. In the 1870s, “quinnant”, or Chinook salmon were reported from lower San Leandro Creek and persisted in Lake Chabot for several years following the completion of Lake Chabot Dam in 1875. California Department of Fish and Game Warden George Smalley reported runs of coho salmon (Oncorhynchus kisutch) and steelhead trout (Oncorhynchus mykiss irideus) in San Leandro Creek “…in the early days” and “…that after the completion of the Upper San Leandro Reservoir a run still persisted to the base of the dam for many years”. Leidy considered this single historical account of coho in the creek "reliable...since we believe that suitable habitat was present in the watershed." As mentioned above, Gibbons discovered rainbow trout in San Leandro Creek in 1855. Thus, three species of Oncorhynchus once inhabited San Leandro Creek.

Today, Lake Chabot's rainbow trout are hatchery fish, but the rainbow trout in San Leandro Reservoir are descended from native steelhead which were trapped when San Leandro Dam was constructed on Redwood Creek in 1926. The San Leandro trout have maintained genetic integrity with native coastal rainbow trout since they have not been mixed with hatchery trout, and were used in a 1983 reintroduction of steelhead to Wildcat Creek in Tilden Regional Park.

== See also ==
- List of watercourses in the San Francisco Bay Area
