= Bollinger Canyon Creek =

Creek in Central California

Bollinger Canyon Creek Bollinger Creek
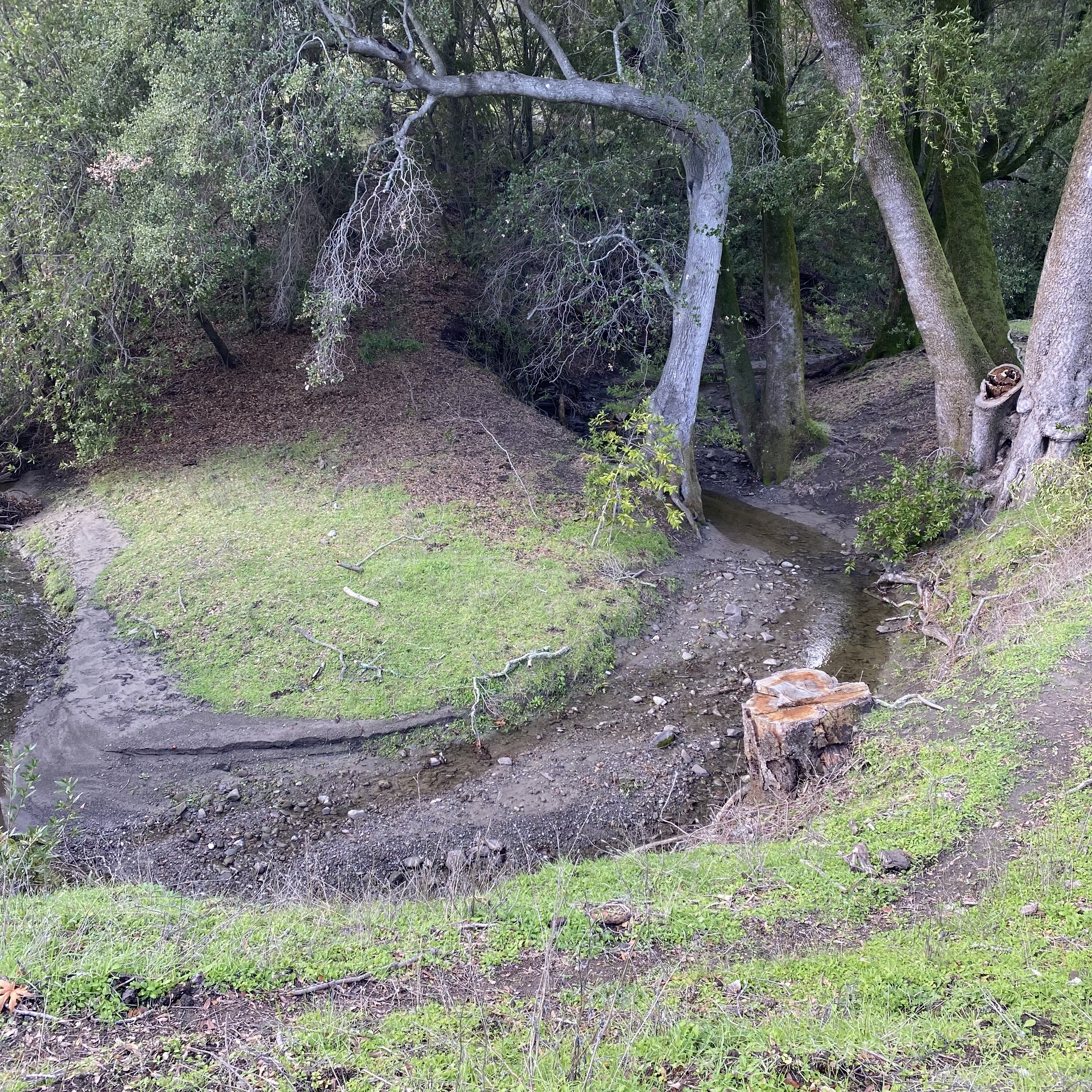
- Upper Bollinger Canyon Creek shaded by mature California Bay and Coast live oak in Las Trampas Regional Wilderness (December 19th, 2021)

Location
- Country: United States
- State: California
- Region: Bay Area
- District: Contra Costa County

Physical characteristics
- Mouth: San Ramon Creek
  - coordinates: 37°46′15″N 121°59′24″W
- Length: 6.72 miles

Basin features
- River system: Walnut Creek
- Cities: San Ramon, CA

Bollinger Canyon Creek is an approximately 6.72-mile-long (10.81 km) stream in Contra Costa County, California in the San Francisco Bay Area. It is a tributary of San Ramon Creek which is part of the Walnut Creek watershed. The creek derives its name from the surname of a family who settled in the area in the 19th century.

== Course ==
Bollinger Canyon Creek begins as a number of ephemeral streams emitting from a horst valley, Bollinger Canyon, in the highest reaches of the Berkeley Hills, in California's Inner Coast Ranges.

The highest point in the drainage is around 2,000 feet above sea level. From a low divide which separates it with Las Trampas Creek, it runs southward through Bollinger Canyon, gradually descending in altitude until turning sharply to the east near Crow Canyon Road in San Ramon, California. It is joined by its only named tributary, San Catanio Creek. Shortly after, it is confined to concrete channels and it joins with San Ramon Creek near the city's downtown.

== Geography ==
Bollinger Creek exhibits a character similar to many other streams in Central California. It is vegetated with California mixed evergreen forest, chaparral and open grasslands, habitats typical of the East Bay region. Many of its tributaries only carry water during storms.

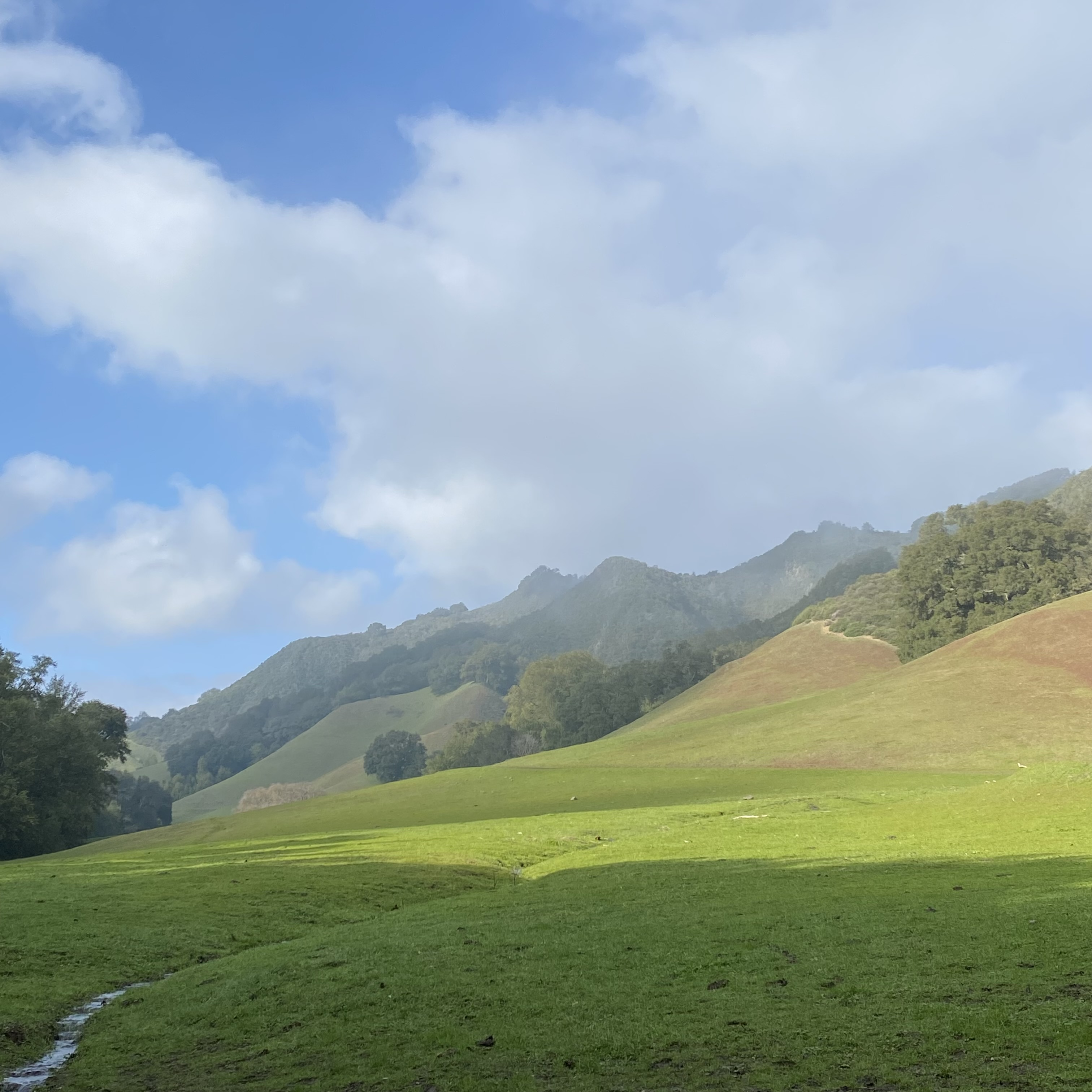
One of the many small tributaries flowing out of the walls of Bollinger Canyon into Bollinger Creek. (December 19th, 2021)

The region surrounding the creek has a cool-summer mediterranean climate which generally keeps temperatures mild. Due to its proximity to the Pacific Ocean, the creek and its watershed are often inundated with fog.

Virtually the entirety of the creek's course upstream from San Ramon, California is undeveloped, with ranching and open space making up the majority of land use.

Bollinger Creek's headwaters lie in EBRPD's Las Trampas Regional Wilderness, which is a popular area among locals for hiking, biking, birding and geology. The park features a number of hiking and biking paths that traverse Bollinger Canyon, Rocky Ridge and Las Trampas Ridge.

The porous formations of Briones Sandstone that comprise the canyon walls trap rainfall and aid the formation of the numerous springs that feed the creek.

== Ecology ==
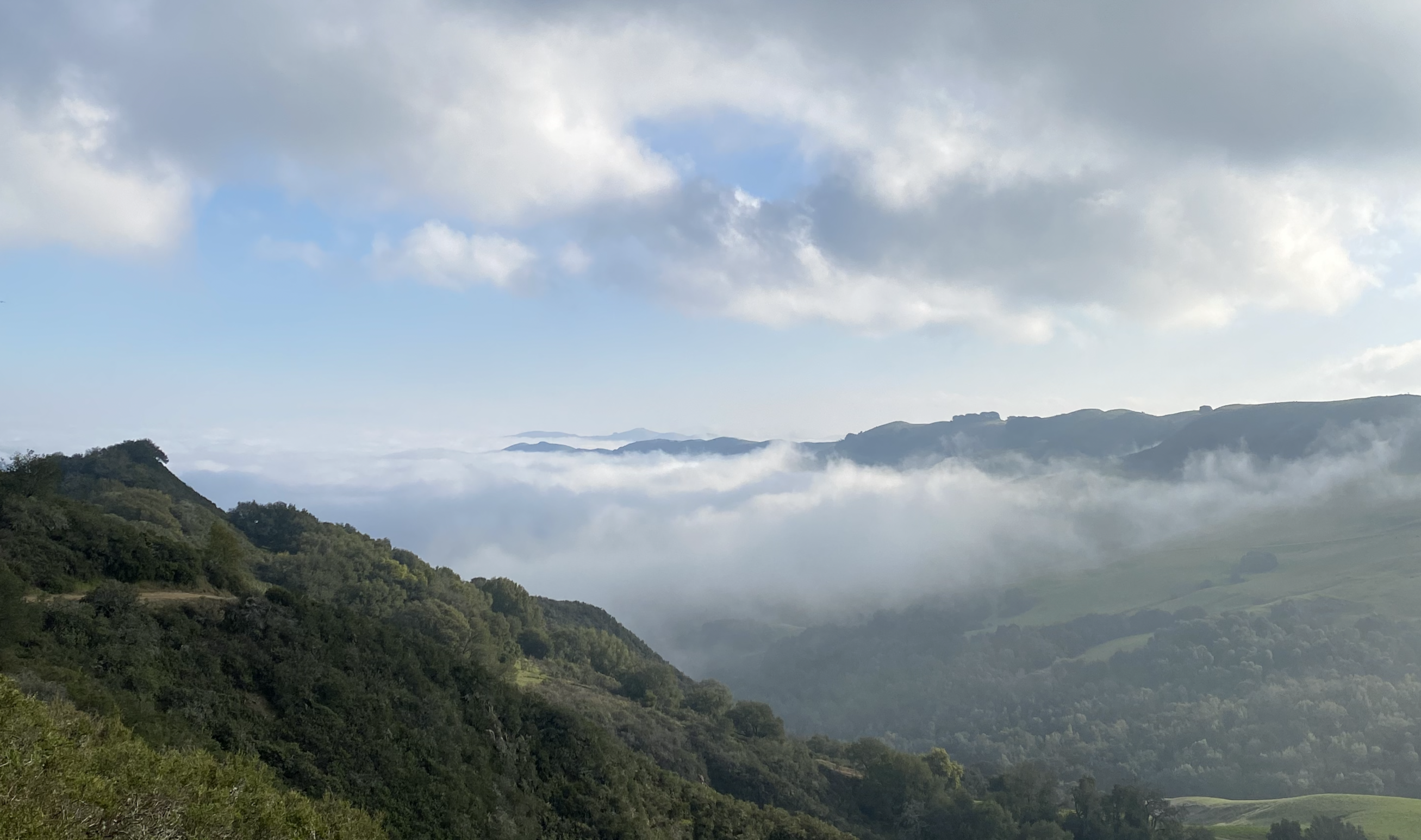
A fog bank creeping up to the divide between Las Trampas Creek and Bollinger Creek, with Rocky Ridge in the background (December, 19th, 2021)

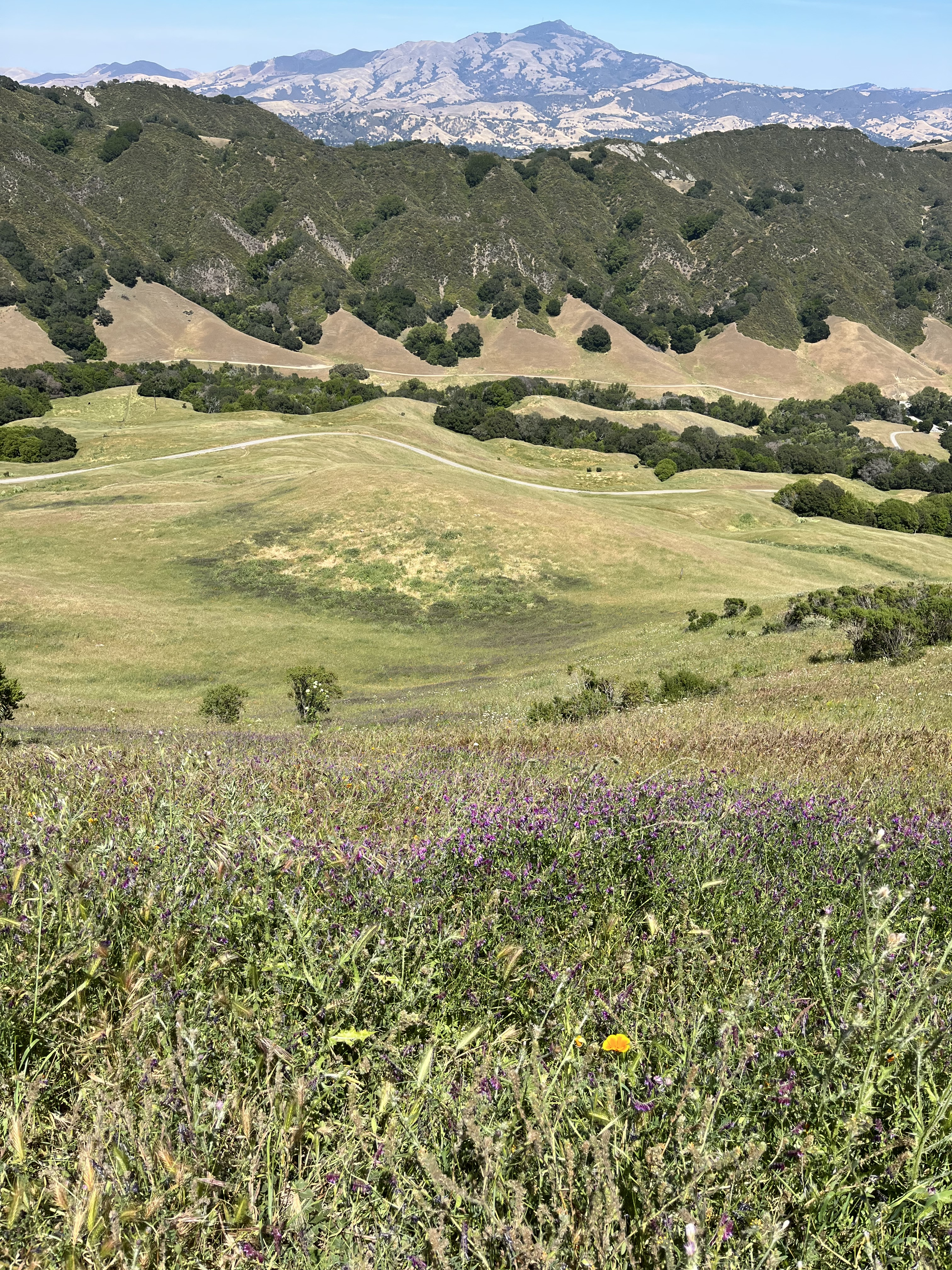
Late spring in Bollinger Canyon from Rocky Ridge; Bollinger Creek runs through a belt of oak and laurel trees with Las Trampas Ridge and Mount Diablo in the background. (May 24th, 2022)

Because much of its course is undeveloped, Bollinger Creek is an important habitat for local wildlife. Much of the land in the watershed is forested and rugged, providing habitat for a variety of wildlife species. Black-tailed deer, Coyote and boar are seen regularly.

A wide variety of raptors, among them Red-shouldered hawks and Great horned owls reside in the watershed, particularly on the steep rock outcrops on Las Trampas Ridge, as well as turkey vultures.

=== Trout Population ===
Bollinger Canyon Creek is unique in that it retains a population of Coastal rainbow trout which have been extirpated from much of the San Francisco Bay watershed through development and the installation of migration barriers like dams. It is speculated that this population is of hatchery origin and escaped from a stocked pond during a flood event. Regardless of their origin, the most recent survey of trout distribution in the region showed that rainbow trout were successfully reproducing in Bollinger Creek. The lack of development in Bollinger Canyon and the quality of the habitat found in the area has likely aided the trouts' establishment in the creek. The total population is unknown, and it is unclear how the trout fared during the severe droughts between 2012 and 2020.
