= Rocky Ridge (California) =

Mountain in SF Bay Area

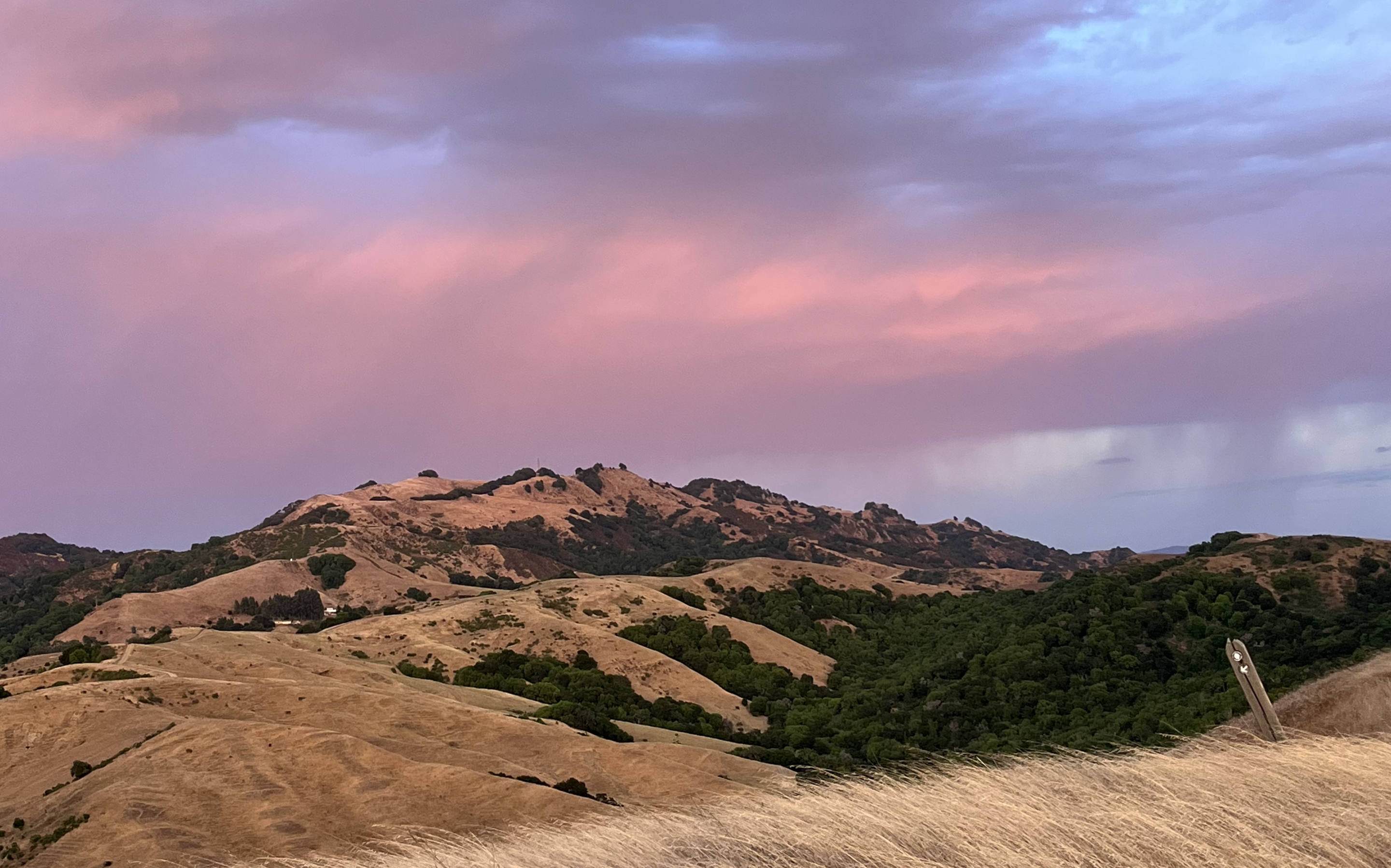
- Rocky Ridge during a rare summer rainstorm (August 13, 2023)

Highest point
- Elevation: 2,020 ft (620 m)
- Coordinates: 37°48′54″N 122°03′41″W

Geography
- Location: Contra Costa County, CA
- Country: United States
- State: California
- County: Contra Costa County
- Parent range: Inner Coast Ranges

Geology
- Rock type: sedimentary

Rocky Ridge is a 2,020 ft (620 m) ridge in the Inner Coast Ranges in western Contra Costa County, California, in the San Francisco Bay Area. Being the second-highest mountain in the county, it is visible from much of the surrounding area. The ridge is a very prominent feature in the geography of the towns of Lafayette, Moraga and Orinda, California.

== Etymology ==
The current name originates from the oddly-formed sedimentary rock outcrops that trace the crest of the ridge.

The original Saclan name for the ridge has been lost, however the current managers of the ridge, the EBRPD and EBMUD, believe it was commonly traversed by native groups.

== Geography ==
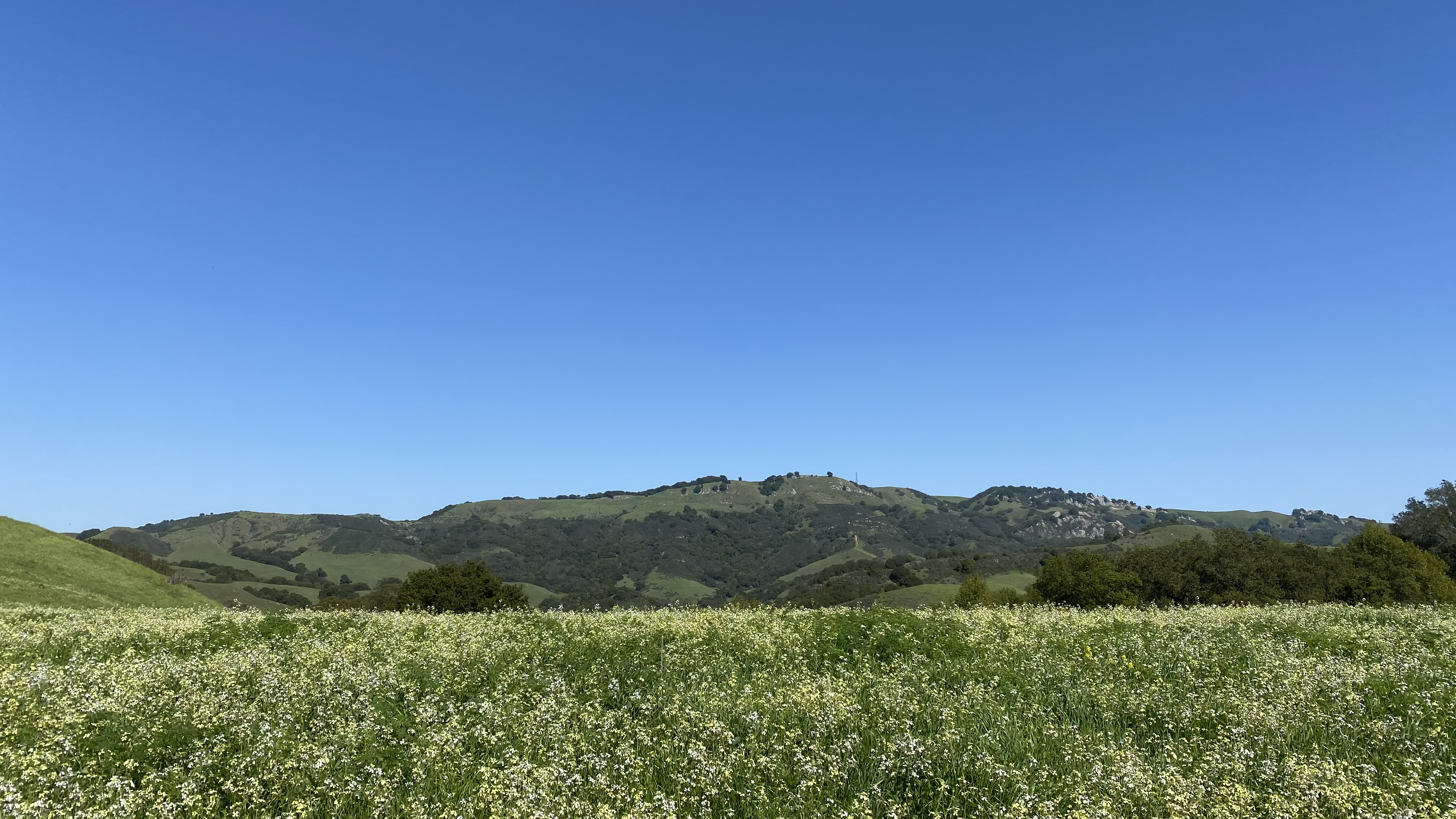
A view of Rocky Ridge's western face from the San Leandro Creek watershed during the Spring wildflower bloom. (April 1, 2021)

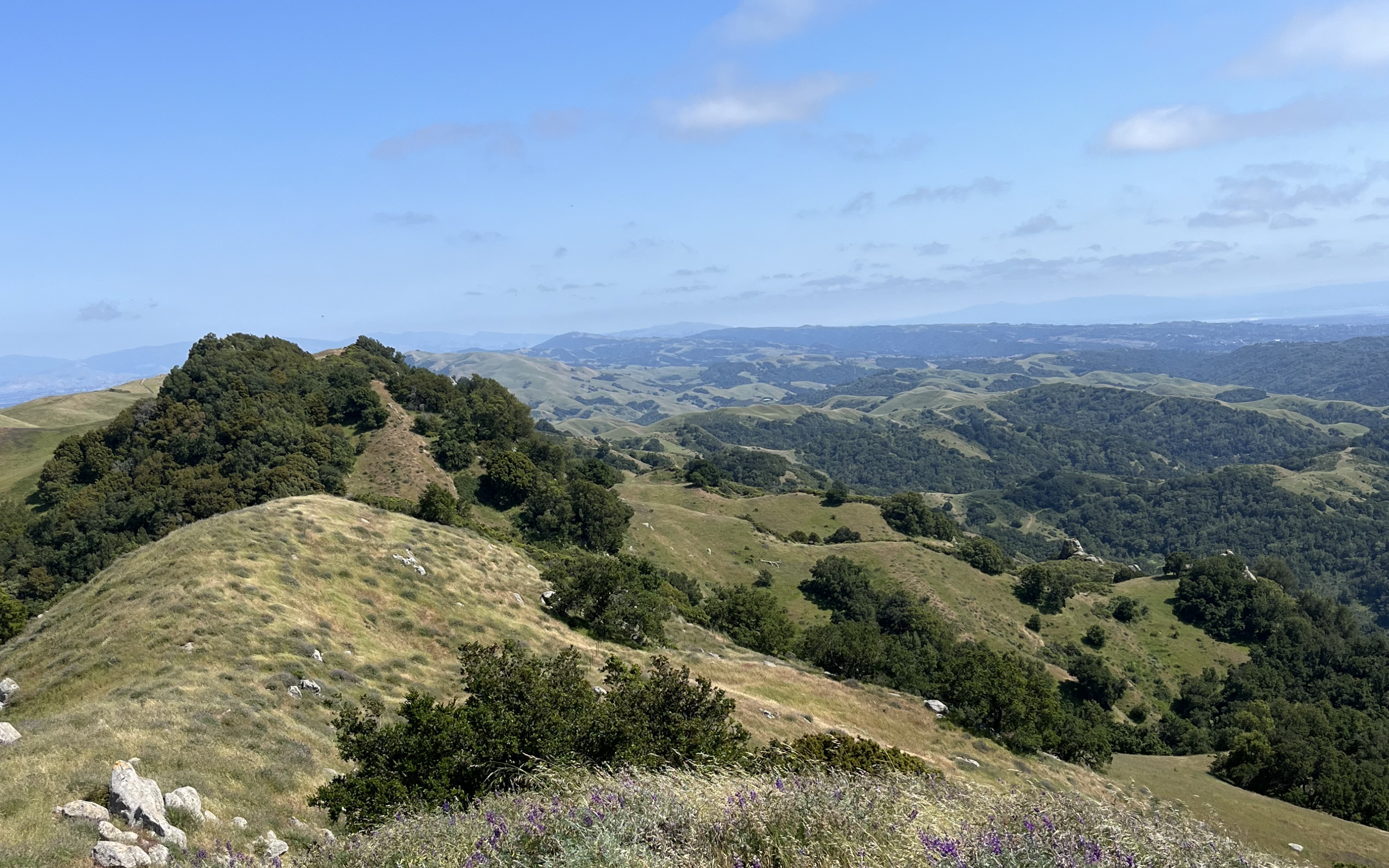
A view south from atop Rocky Ridge towards Alameda County and the valleys of Kaiser, Cull and Crow creeks. The region about Rocky Ridge represents one of the last large areas of undeveloped land in the East Bay (May 25, 2023)

Rocky Ridge is the highest point in the Berkeley Hills, which are a generally north–south trending subrange of the Inner Coast Ranges named for the nearby city of Berkeley, California. The region has a cool-summer Mediterranean climate and frequently receives fog from the nearby Pacific Ocean. Winters are wet and mild, while the summers are hot, but cooler than many other places in California due to the marine influence. The ridge typically receives about 27" of rainfall per year in addition to consistent moisture from fog on its upper portions throughout the year.

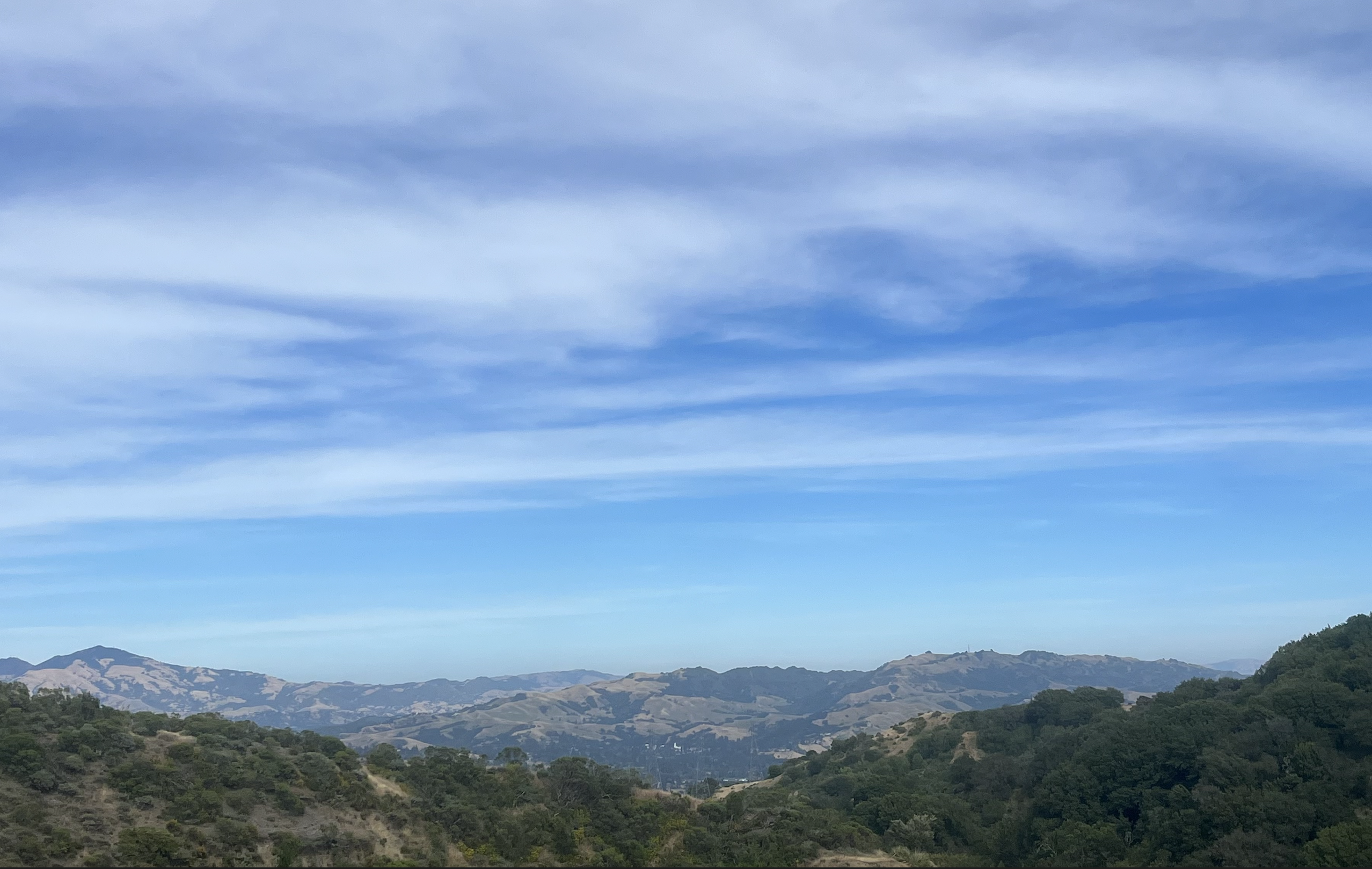
A view south and east from Round Top (1,764') in the Berkeley Hills, showing Rocky Ridge and its neighboring mountains. From left to right: Mount Diablo (3,449'), Las Trampas Peak (1,827') and Rocky Ridge (2,024') (June 2, 2024)

Rocky Ridge is the divide between the San Leandro Creek watershed which drains west to the San Francisco Bay, and the Walnut Creek watershed which drains north into the Carquinez Strait. Part of Rocky Ridge serves as the boundary line between Contra Costa County on the eastern side and Alameda County on the west. The eastern face of the ridge is included in the East Bay Regional Park District's Las Trampas Regional Wilderness and is a popular area for hiking and other outdoor activities. The western face of the ridge is part of EBMUD's San Leandro Creek Watershed and permits are required to enter. The roughly 50 square miles of watershed land on the ridge's western side is largely undeveloped and rugged.

A partially paved road built for access to a former Nike Missile launch site on top of the ridge is now used as a hiking path with connections to a wide assembly of single track paths maintained by both managers of the ridge. There is a telecommunications tower on the north end of the ridge.

As a result of its steepness and prominence, Rocky Ridge has an extensive viewshed that includes the city of San Francisco, the Golden Gate, Mount Tamalpais and San Mateo, Marin, Napa, Sonoma, Santa Clara and Alameda Counties, as well as Mount Diablo and its environs.

== Geology ==
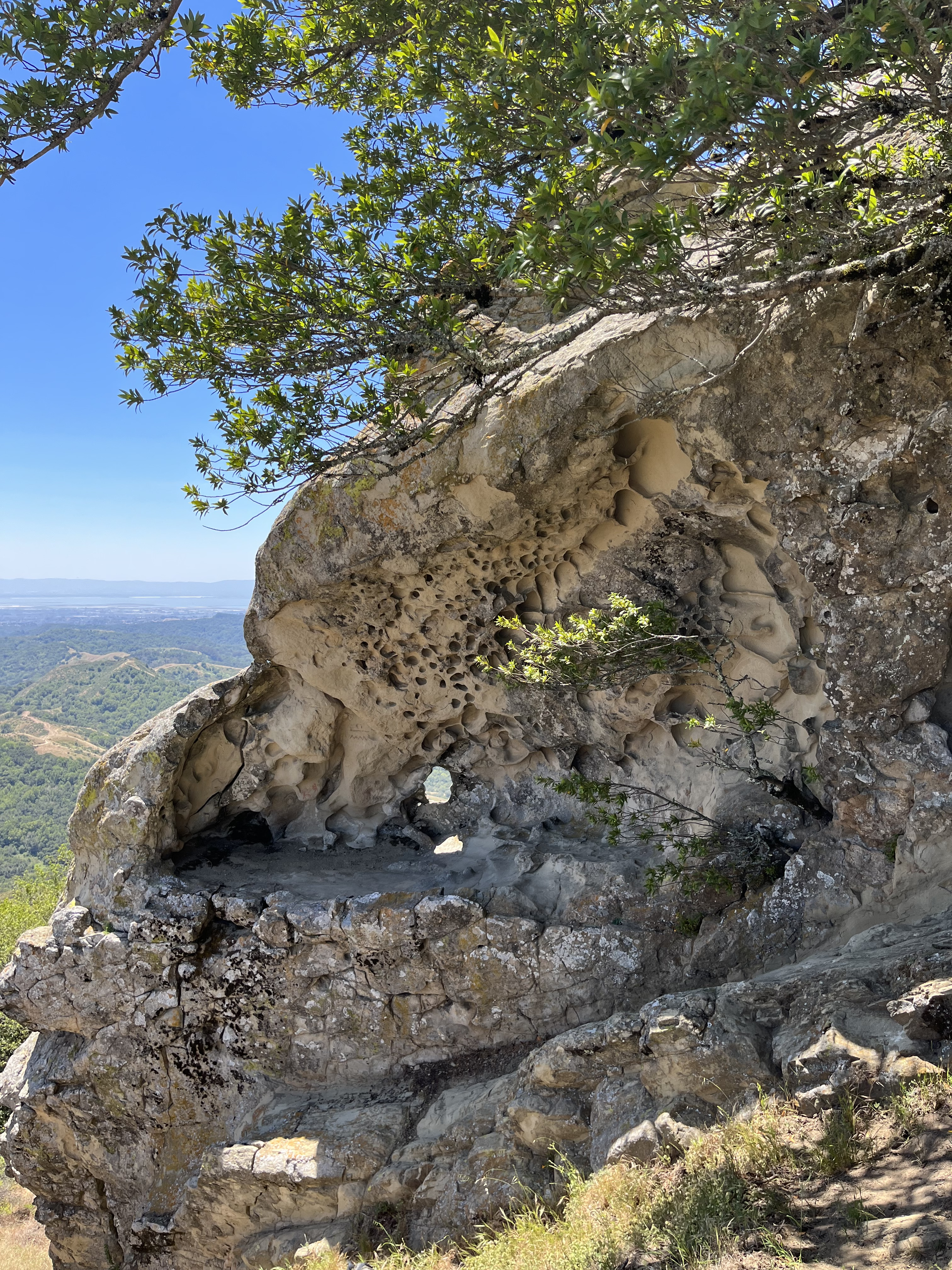
An example of the unique sedimentary formations of Cierbo Graywacke found along the crest of Rocky Ridge. Some outcrops stand 50 feet above ground level (May 24th, 2022)

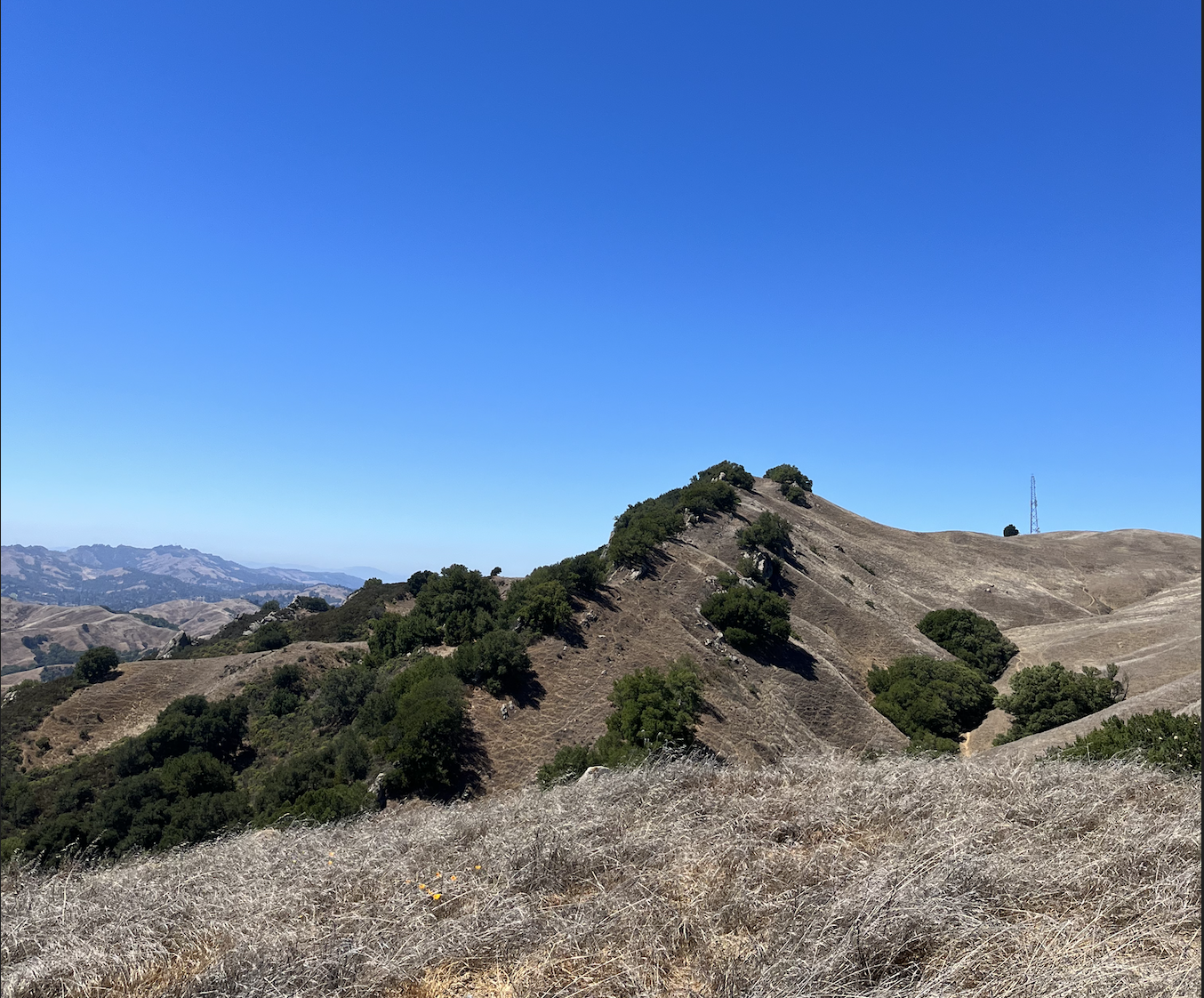
A north-facing view from atop the ridge shows the steep angle of uplift (August 12th, 2022)

Rocky Ridge is composed of marine sedimentary rock from the Miocene Epoch. The ridge was uplifted as a result of overthrusting and the millions of years of folding and faulting characteristic of much of the west coast, particularly the convergence of the Bollinger and Lafayette transform faults. The prominent scarp that follows the top of the ridge traces the path of the Bollinger fault. Land on the western side of the ridge is being pushed up and over the eastern side by tectonic forces and the ridge is currently increasing in height as a result. The intense and rapid uplift experienced by Rocky Ridge and its surroundings accounts for the extreme steepness of the ridge's upper portion.

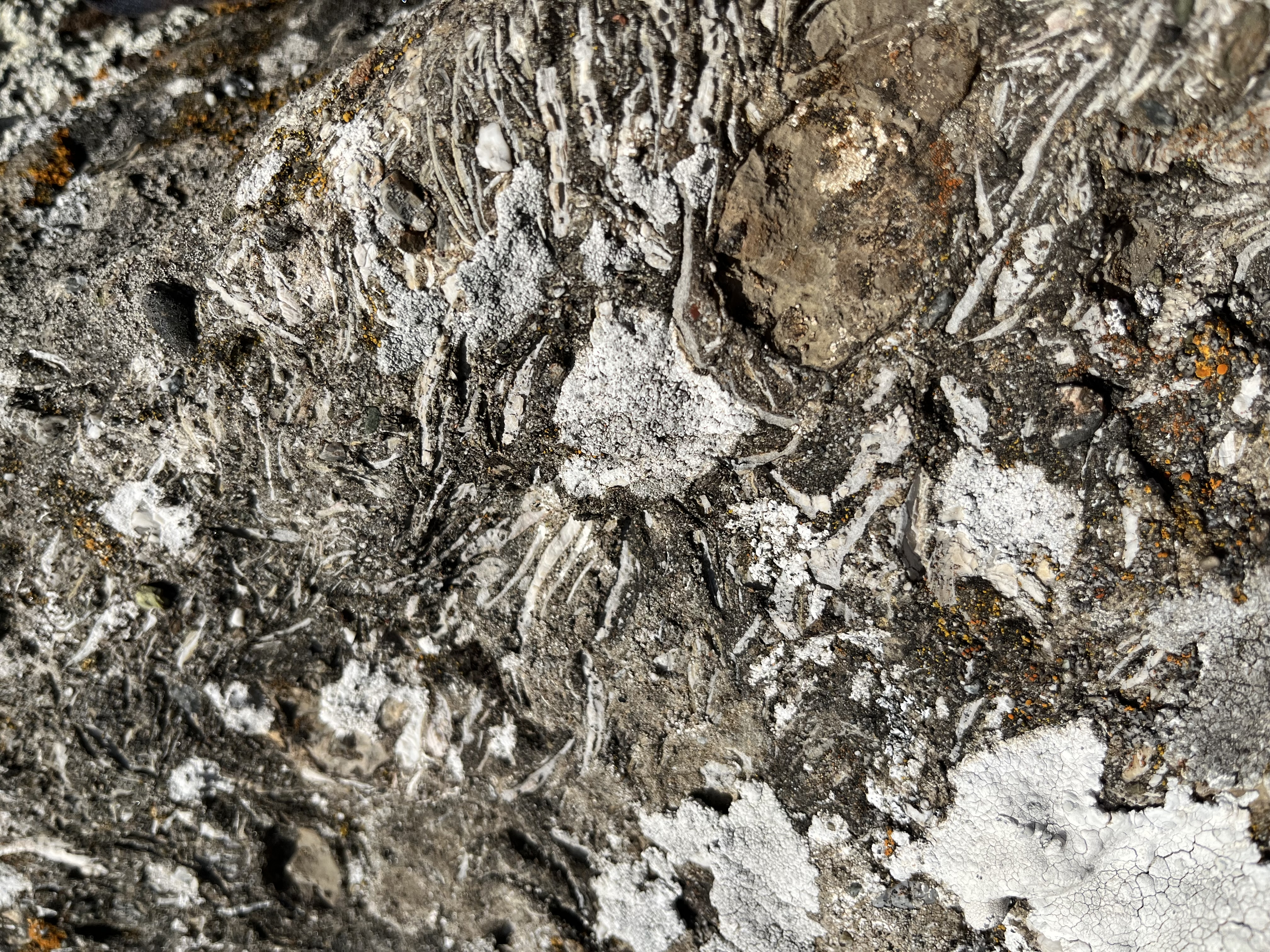
Briones Sandstone full of marine fossils on Rocky Ridge (July 6th, 2022)

Upturned beds of Briones Formation sandstone that comprise the crest of the ridge are very fossiliferous and many species of ancient marine sea creatures can be seen, as the seafloor where they were deposited is now thrown up into steep rock outcrops nearly 2000' above sea level.

Where the rock juts out of the soil along the crest of the ridge, numerous aeolian caves have formed over the millennia, imparting a unique character to the rock formations.

Multiple ephemeral and perennial springs emitting from the crest of the ridge form numerous creeks like Las Trampas Creek, Bollinger Creek, which flow north into Walnut Creek, and Buckhorn Creek, Kaiser Creek, Cull Creek and Crow Creek among others, which flow west into Upper San Leandro Reservoir and San Lorenzo Creek.

== Ecology ==
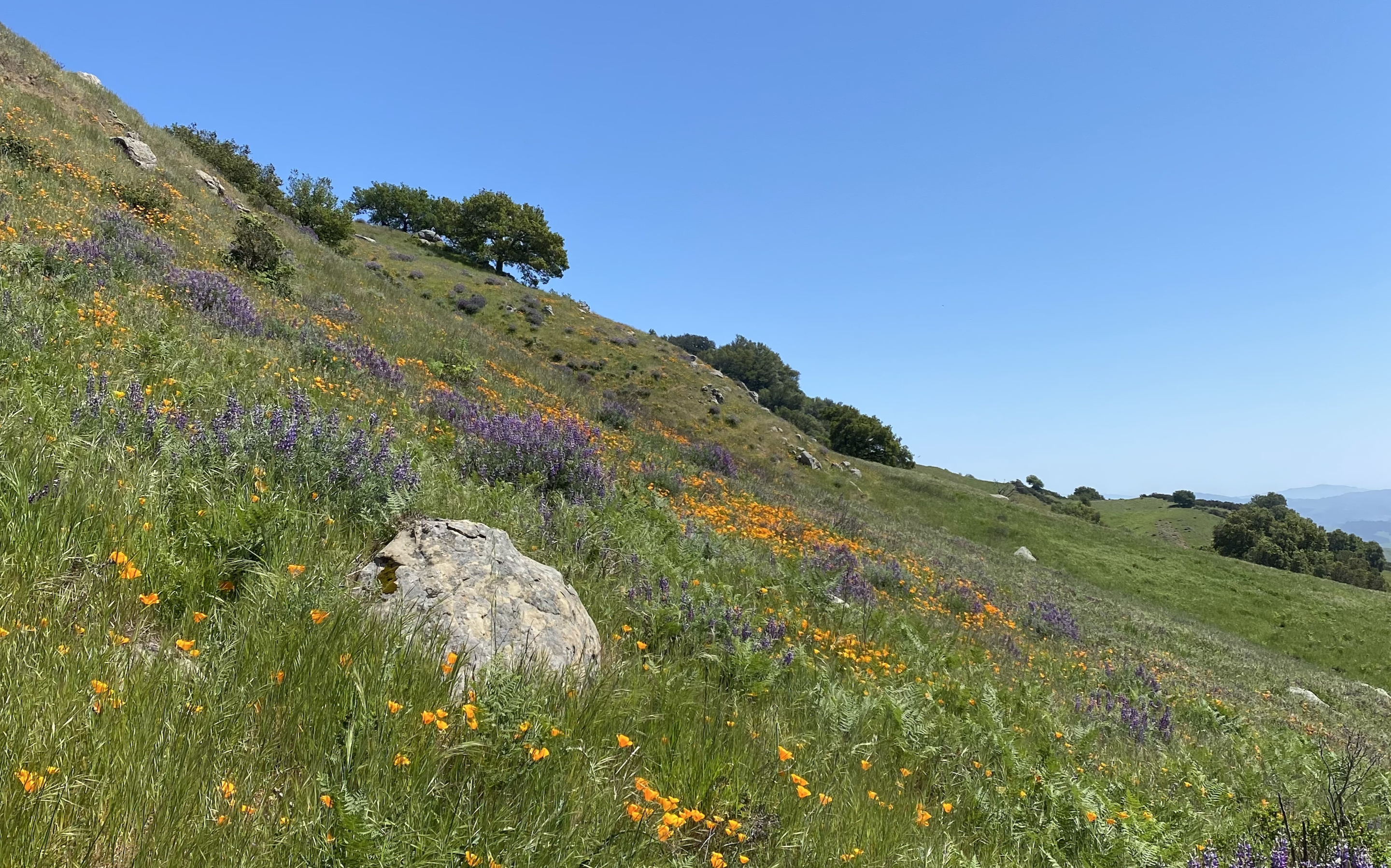
California Poppies and Lupinus albifrons blooming among ferns on the crest of Rocky Ridge (April 19, 2021)

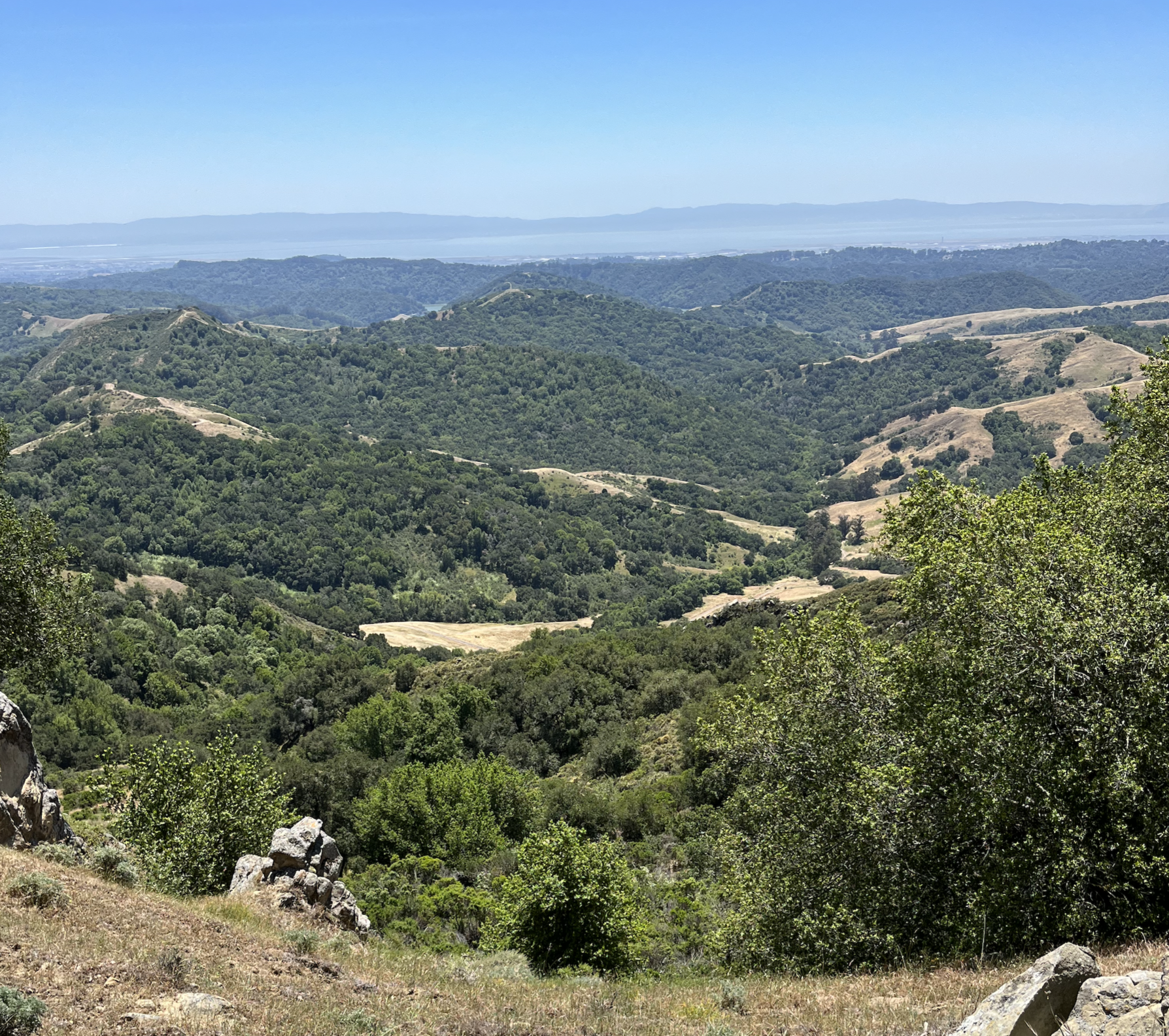
View of the San Francisco Bay and the upper watershed of San Leandro Creek covered in California evergreen forest and Chaparral from Rocky Ridge (May 24th, 2022)

Rocky Ridge is host to a number of different habitats typical of the California Coast Ranges. In lower elevations and in the valleys emanating from the ridge, there is extensive coverage of California mixed evergreen forest with Coast Live Oak, Valley oak, California Buckeye and California Bay being the dominant tree species. In riparian areas, Big-leaf maple and white alder are common alongside the regular suite of oaks. Higher in elevation, the ridge is dominated by chaparral and annual grassland (sp. Avena, sp. Bromus).

Cattle grazing in the area since the 1800s has severely altered the plant communities on the ridge and facilitated the establishment of invasive and exotic species. Soil compaction caused by herds also inhibits the establishment of native species.

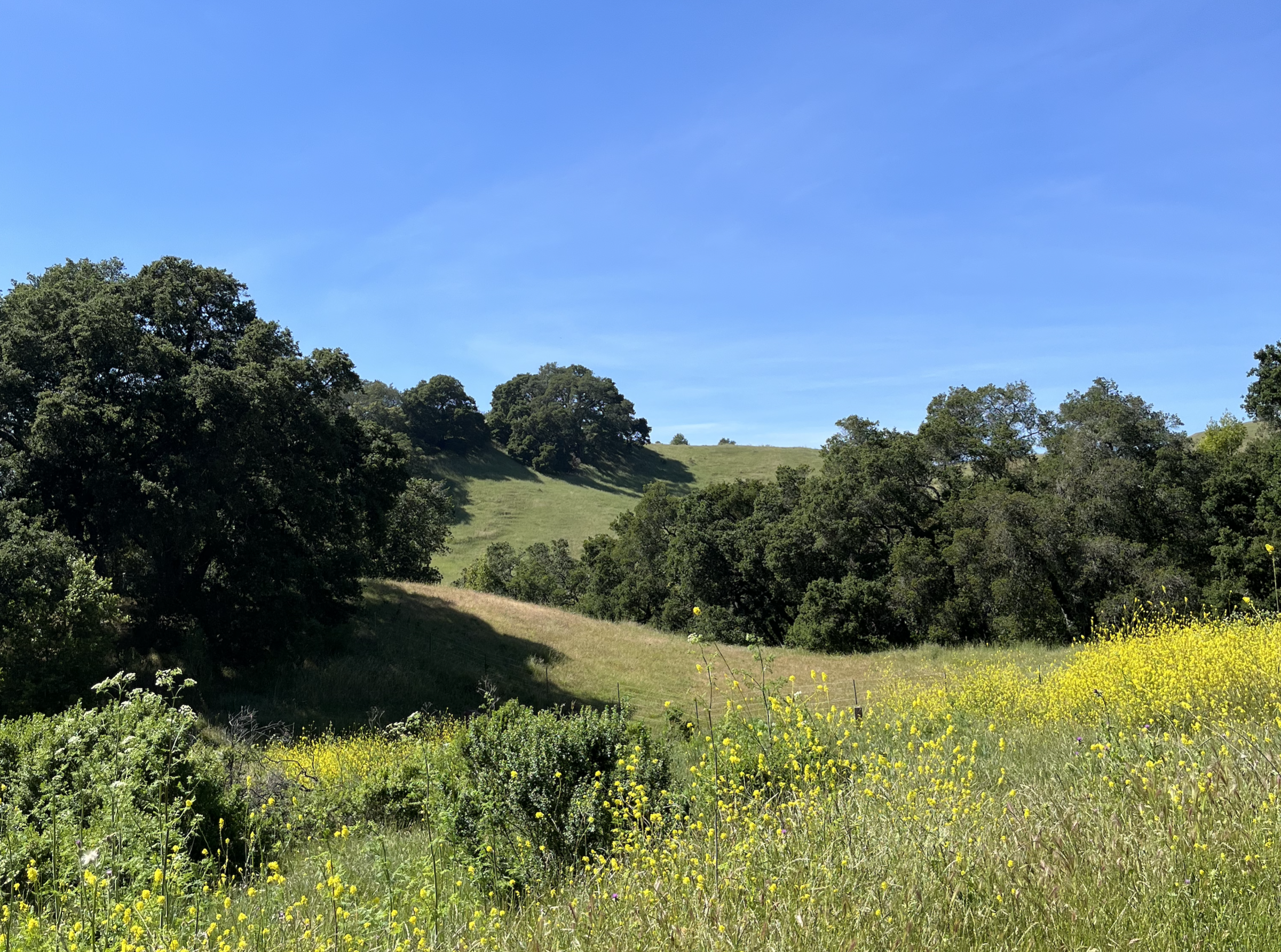
A savanna of Valley oak and Coast Live Oak with an understory of native and nonnative plants at the foot of Rocky Ridge (May 19th, 2022)

Along the crest of the ridge, where it is much wetter than lower elevations due to frequent fogs from the Pacific Ocean, a microhabitat exists in which moss-covered California Bay and oaks can be found growing amongst multiple species of ferns and woodland strawberry. Due to its relative high elevation and very steep slopes, moisture from fog is easily trapped by the ridge, allowing plants accustomed to wetter habitats to survive.

Rocky Ridge and the surrounding region are home to an abundance of wildlife, the largest and most common being the black-tailed deer. Coyotes, Bobcats, Cottontail rabbits, Prairie dogs as well as Red-shouldered hawk, Red-tailed hawk, Turkey vulture and a wide variety of songbirds are encountered commonly on the ridge. Hikers on the ridge should be wary of letting small dogs off leash in the early morning or evening due to the presence of coyotes. Less commonly seen animals include mountain lions and badgers, though they are known to inhabit the area.

== See also ==
- Las Trampas Peak
- Las Trampas Regional Wilderness
- Las Trampas Creek
- Bollinger Canyon Creek
- Buckhorn Creek
- Great Valley Sequence
- Steelhead and salmon distinct population segments
