= Cull Creek =

Creek in California

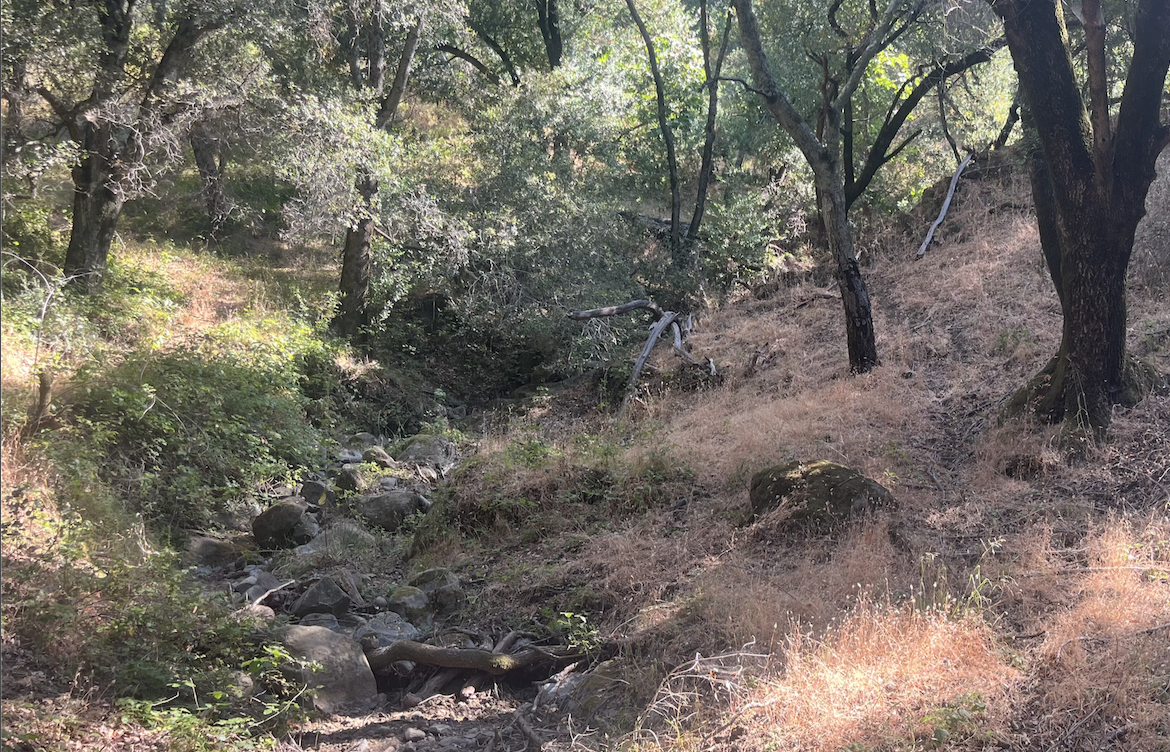
- The main branch of Cull Creek near its headwaters, dry during the summer (July 24th, 2024)

- Location of Cull Creek in California

Location
- Country: United States
- State: California
- County: Alameda County

Physical characteristics
- Source
  - location: Rocky Ridge (California)
- Mouth: Crow Creek (Alameda County)
  - coordinates: 37°42′05.8″N 122°03′14.9″W
- Length: 7.5 m (25 ft)

Cull Creek is a 7.5 mile long creek in Contra Costa and Alameda Counties, California. It is a tributary to Crow Creek, which is itself a tributary to San Lorenzo Creek.

== Course ==
Cull Creek begins in Las Trampas Regional Wilderness on Rocky Ridge, in San Ramon, California. From there, it flows generally south and west through a mix of private and conservation lands, as well as through Cull Canyon Regional Recreation Area, near which it joins San Lorenzo Creek. It is impounded by the Cull Creek Reservoir as well as farm ponds along its course.

== History ==
Cull Creek is within the historical territory of the Yrgin Ohlone people, who would have utilized it as not only a place to hunt, gather and bathe, but also as a place of spiritual significance. Their long and continued presence in the San Lorenzo Creek watershed is attested to by bedrock mortars and other stonework.

== Geography ==
Cull Creek drains an area of rugged and largely undeveloped terrain in the Berkeley Hills. Much of the land area in the upper watershed is used for cattle ranching or open space.

The lowest reaches of the watershed are extensively suburbanized. Cull Canyon Regional Recreation Area is located on the lower part of the creek, near its confluence with Crow Creek.

Cull Canyon Road parallels the course of Cull Creek high into its watershed, providing access to a number of private residences.

== Ecology ==
The Cull Creek watershed is characteristic of many streams in the East Bay. Much of its watershed is covered in coast mixed evergreen forest, with Coast Live Oak (Quercus agrifolia), Valley Oak (Quercus lobata), California Bay (Umbellularia Californica) and chaparral communities being the dominant species. Species like Gray Pine are not present on account of the proximity to the coastal fog belt.

Invasive annual grasslands associated with cattle ranching make up a considerable portion of the watershed area.

=== Rainbow Trout Population ===
Like many other streams in the San Lorenzo Creek watershed, and the wider Bay Area, Cull Creek historically hosted a population of Steelhead Trout (Oncorhyncus mykiss irideus). These fish would seasonally ascend the creek during the wet season to spawn.

A report by the Center for Ecosystem Management and Restoration (CEMAR) stated that Cull Creek "probably received use as a spawning area in some years".

A combination of habitat degradation, flow diversions and in-stream barriers to fish migration like dams, steelhead trout have been extirpated from Cull Creek, though sporadic sightings have occurred over the years. A farm pond constructed around mile 4 of Cull Creek is noted as a complete barrier to fish migration.

In 1963, Cull Creek was dammed to create the Cull Canyon Reservoir for the purposes of flood control. This, along with other alterations to the stream and its watershed, contributed to the extirpation of native trout and salmon species. A debate has begun over whether the dam should remain, as its storage capacity is severely diminished by the large amount of sediment deposited in the reservoir by Cull Creek.
