= Little Hills Picnic Ranch =

Reservation-only event venue in California

Little Hills Events
- Interactive map of Little Hills Events
- Type: Picnic park
- Location: Contra Costa County, California
- Nearest city: San Ramon, California
- Coordinates: 37.810°N 122.043°W
- Area: 100 acres (40 ha)
- Operator: East Bay Regional Park District
- Open: Open April through October, only by reservation with Palmdale Estates Events.
- Status: Operational

Little Hills , sometimes called the "Little Hills Events" or just "Little Hills" is a park and private event venue in Contra Costa County, California near San Ramon. It is located at 18013 Bollinger Canyon Road and is adjacent to Las Trampas Regional Wilderness. Managed by the East Bay Regional Parks District (EBRPD), it is classed as a "picnic park," accessible only by reservation. There are no facilities for camping.

== Overview ==
This park covers 100 acres (40 ha) and contains eight picnic sites. Facilities are available for basketball, tetherball, dunk tank, garden games, volleyball, ping pong, horseshoes, rock climbing. Picnic tables and restrooms are wheelchair accessible. Parking spaces are available for disabled visitors. Palmdale Estates Events offers catering and event management services.
