= Las Trampas Creek =

Coordinates: 37°53′39″N 122°03′35″W

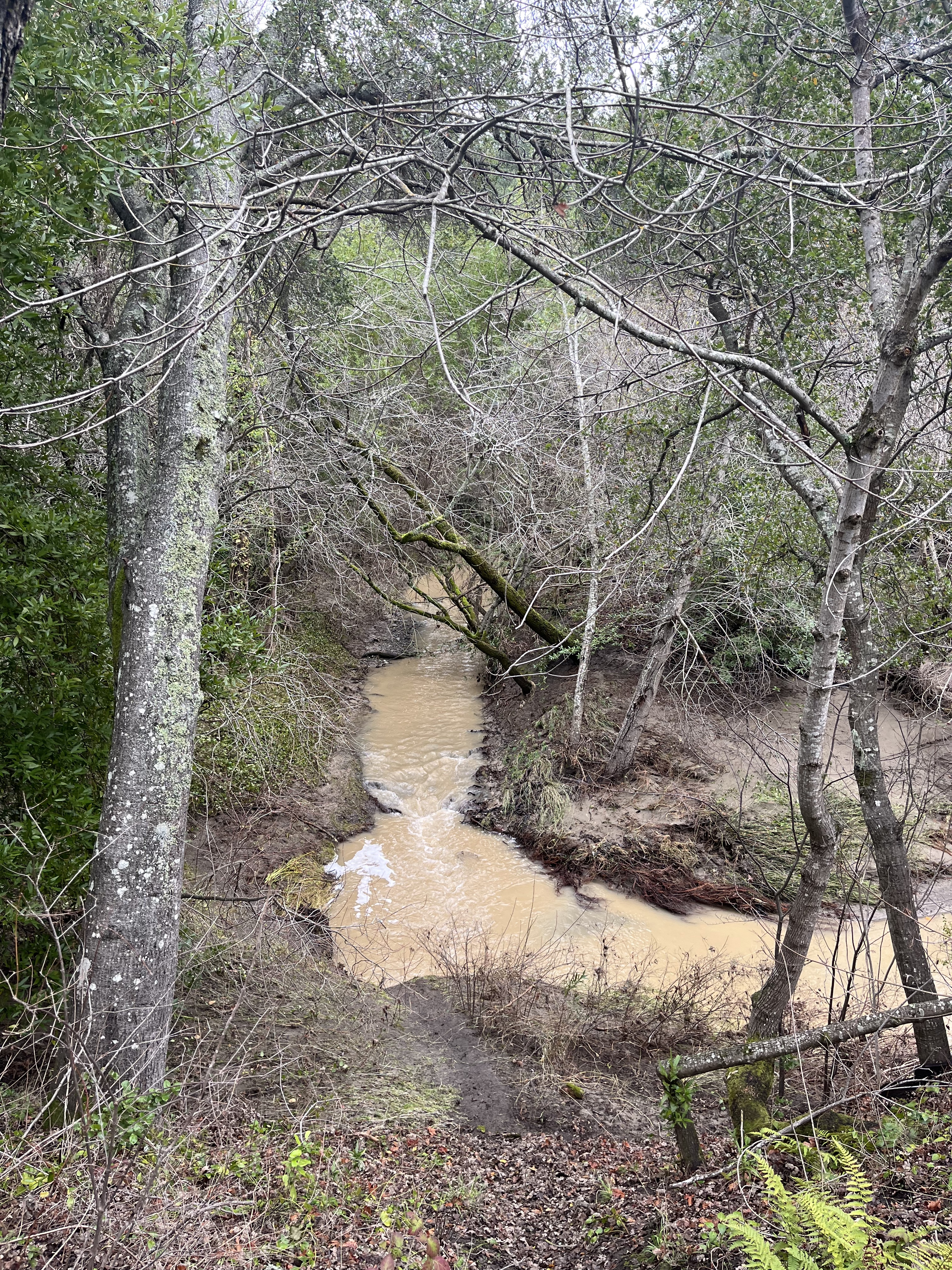
- Las Trampas Creek near its confluence with Grizzly Creek in Lafayette, California, following a rain storm (January 2nd, 2023)

Location
- Country: United States
- State: California
- County: Contra Costa County

Las Trampas Creek is a 12.37 mile (19.9 km) long north-east flowing stream in Contra Costa County, California. Its watershed comprises an area of 17,238 acres. Its mean daily flow is approximately 15.4 cfs.

== Course ==
Las Trampas Creek and its principal tributaries drain the rugged north face of Rocky Ridge and the Las Trampas Regional Wilderness from an elevation of around 2000' above sea level. It is formed from several small and intermittent springs in the Las Trampas Hills, and its headwaters have steep falls through forests of Coast Live Oak, Valley Oak, California Bay Laurel and Madrone flowing northwest before taking an abrupt turn to the northeast in the vicinity of Saint Mary's College in Moraga, CA. After reaching the valley floor, it receives Grizzly Creek, one of its largest tributaries. After receiving Lafayette Creek, in downtown Lafayette, California, it continues for several miles to the northeast downstream to its confluence with San Ramon Creek in Walnut Creek, California, forming Walnut Creek.

== Ecology ==
The Las Trampas Creek Basin is a tapestry of rural, suburban and urban lands; its highest reaches remaining relatively pristine in appearance aside from the intrusions of cattle ranching, hiking paths and a single road. The watershed has a Warm-summer Mediterranean climate, receiving relatively heavy marine fog at times. As the creek descends in elevation, the intensity of urban development increases. Out of all sub watersheds within the Walnut Creek, Las Trampas Creek receives the most average rainfall, at 26 inches.

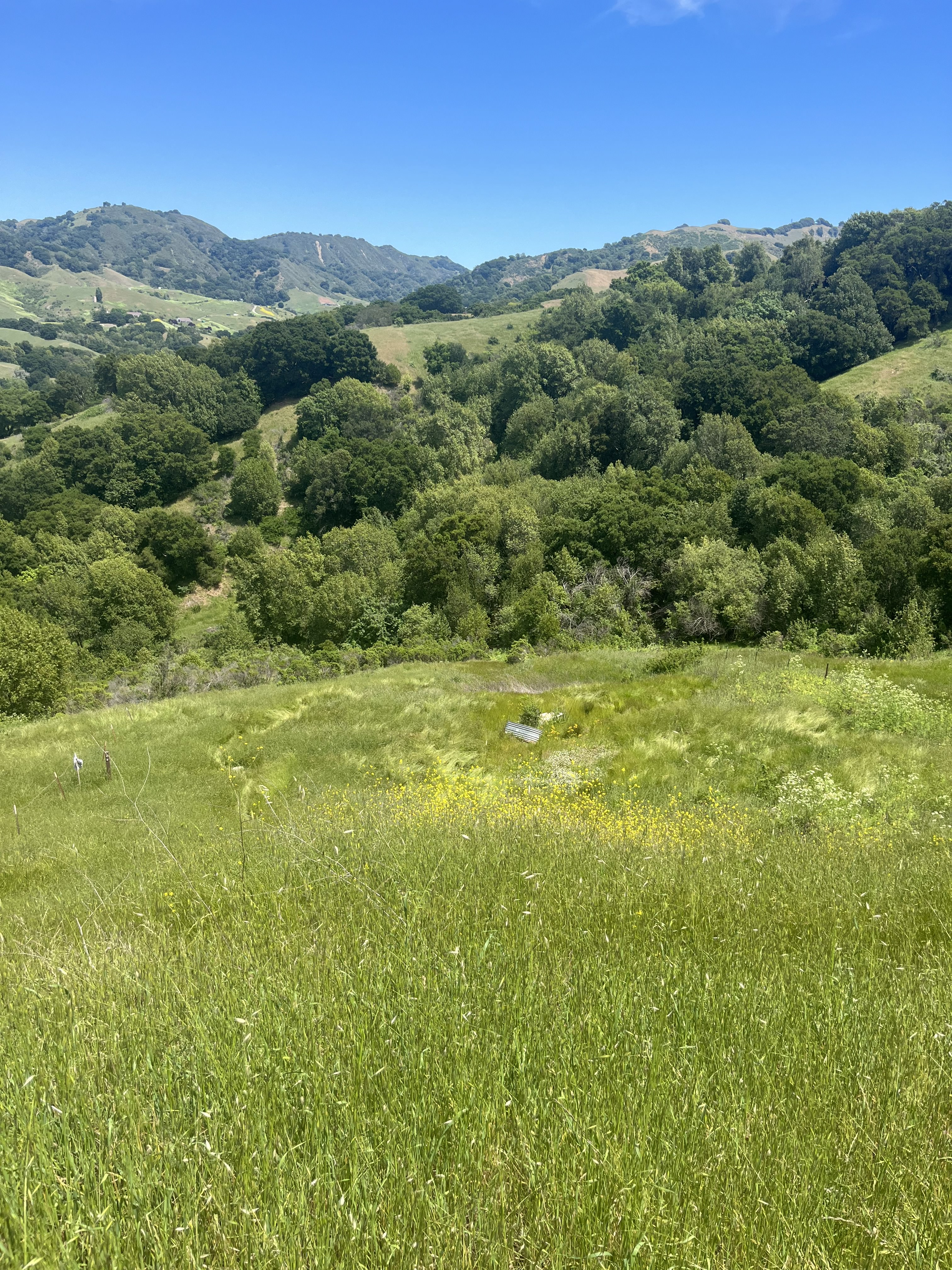
A view of upper Las Trampas Creek Canyon, with Las Trampas Peak on the left and Rocky Ridge on the right (May 21st, 2023)

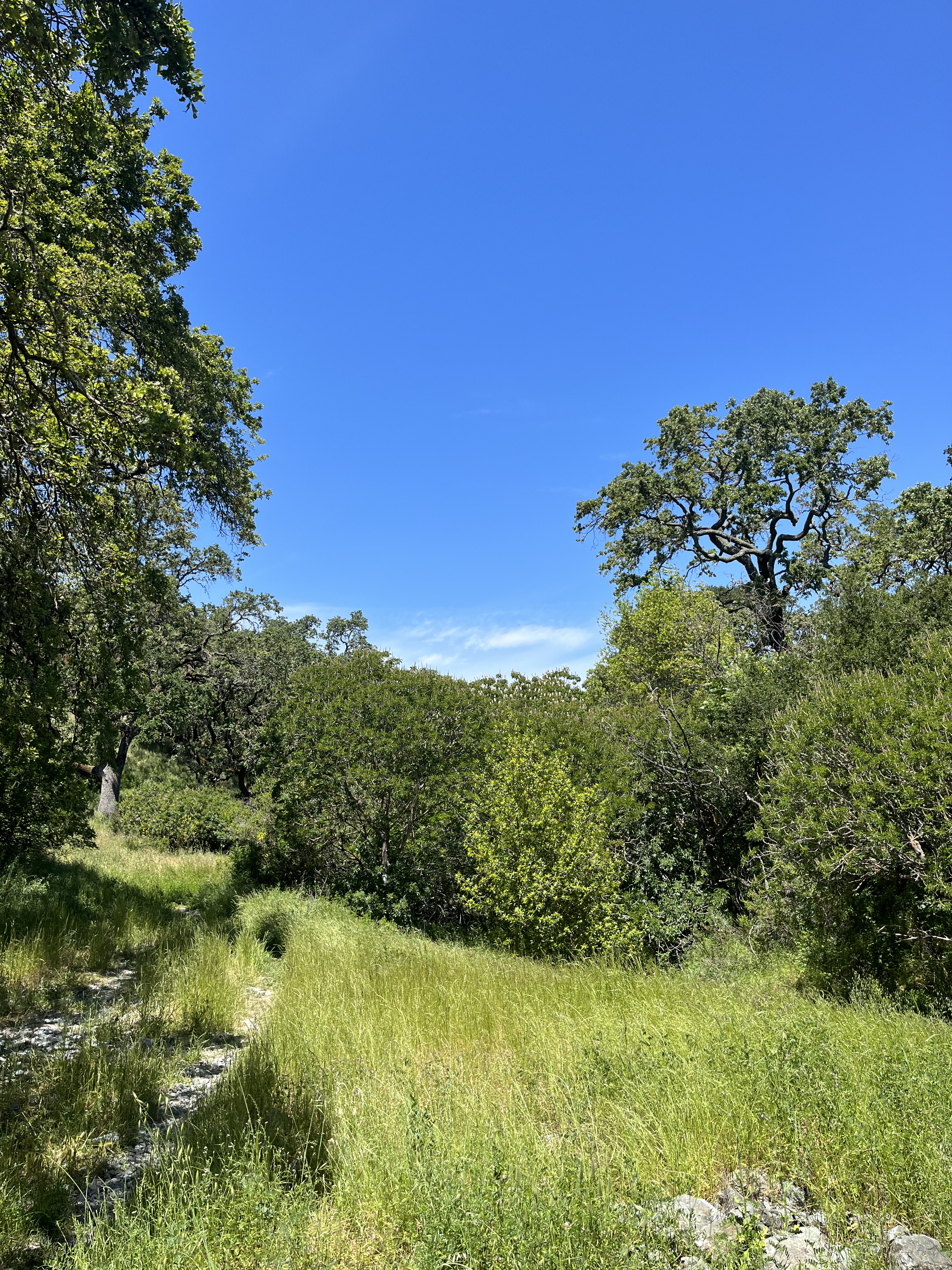
A forested valley in the middle watershed populated with mature valley oaks, California bay, buckeye and coast live oak (May 14th, 2022)

Rugged slopes draped in Chaparral, California oak woodland and invasive annual grassland with small forested valleys in between define the watercourse.

Although almost all of the flat land along the creek's course has been subjected to development of some form during the last century, the rugged ridges that make up a considerable portion of the watershed remain lightly, if at all developed, and are a vital refuge for wildlife and humans alike from a highly urbanized surrounding landscape.

Coyotes, blacktail deer, raccoons and other wildlife can be found commonly in the watershed, often in suburbanized areas, with mountain lion being present on occasion but rarely seen. The watershed has an impressive and vocal suite of birds, with turkey vultures, multiple species of hawks and many species of songbird being abundant. Owls and coyotes can be heard often at dusk, night and in the early morning.

The creek itself supports river otter, numerous species of birds, and fish such as the Three-spined stickleback.

=== Historical ecology ===
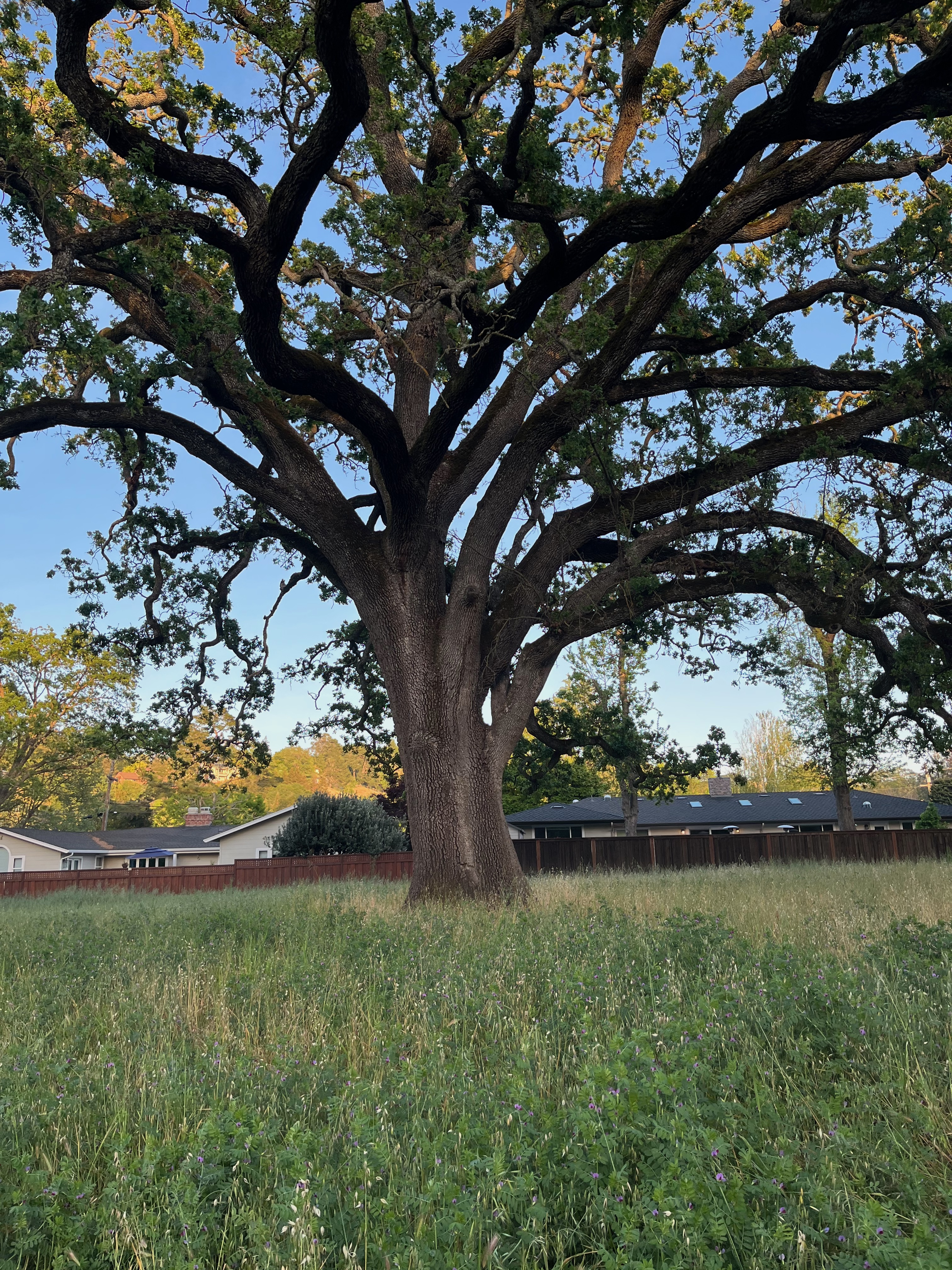
A towering valley oak stands amidst suburban development at the confluence of Grizzly and Las Trampas Creeks. This tree likely predates the arrival of Europeans in the watershed.(May 23rd, 2021)

Downstream from present Saint Mary's College in Moraga, CA essentially all the way to its confluence with Walnut Creek, Las Trampas Creek coursed through a wide and undulating valley floor near the community of Burton Valley with deep soil, it spread its waters out across a broad floodplain in times of excess flow, and retained water only in pools during times of drought. This section of the course would have supported a Valley Oak Savannah intermixed with riparian and foothill vegetation; remnants of this habitat still line a few portions of Las Trampas Creek and its tributaries, most likely spared from the farmer's axe for their utility in preventing evaporation of the creek in the dry season. The majority of this habitat, however, was destroyed to make way for dry-farmed wheat and eventually walnut and pear orchards during the late 1800s up to the mid-1900s, when the orchards themselves were replaced by suburbs.

The Las Trampas Creek watershed almost assuredly supported a population of Steelhead Trout prior to the extensive development of the lower and middle portions of its course, as well as to Walnut Creek downstream. Trout were last seen consistently in the watershed during the early 1950s, with sightings occurring occasionally up to the 1980s in the Las Trampas Creek mainstem, though studies have concluded there is no longer a self-sustaining trout population for a variety of reasons. There are currently several major passage barriers to anadromous fish along Las Trampas Creek, which deny access to habitat that has been rated among the best in the Walnut Creek Watershed for steelhead survival. Excepting the passage barriers, the urbanized sections of the creek are often polluted with urban waste and runoff during floods.

North American beaver likely inhabited Las Trampas creek and its tributaries, as noted by early visitors to the region. Like in other places in arid western North America, the beaver probably played a crucial role in retaining water through the dry season and providing habitat for fish and wildlife.

Accounts of the region from Spanish and Mexican times (1769 to 1848) speak of large herds of tule elk inhabiting the hills and valleys that would have no doubt taken advantage of the fertile grazing lands and watering holes provided by Las Trampas Creek. In fact, the name "Las Trampas" or in English "the traps" is in reference to the strategy of native Saclan hunters who would chase elk and deer into the steep, impassable canyons of the headwaters, trapping them for easy pickings.

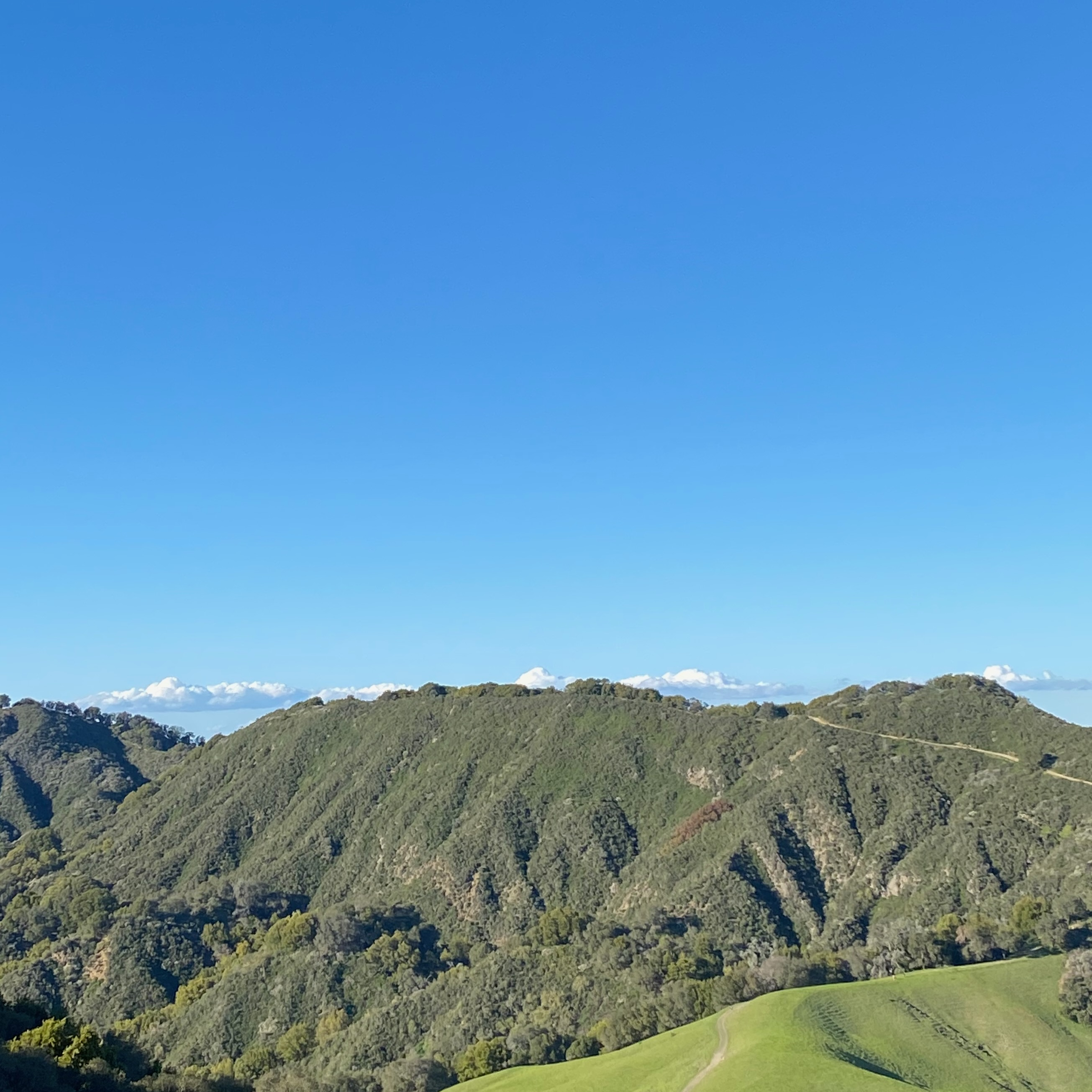
An example of the steep terrain which Saclan hunters would use to their advantage when hunting game, the Spanish-speaking inhabitants of the area later dubbing the mountains from which Las Trampas Creek rises "La Sierra de Las Trampas" (April 11th, 2021)

The demand for agricultural land throughout the late 19th and early 20th centuries led landowners to clear the forests and savannas of oak trees that filled the valley bottoms along Las Trampas Creek to plant grain fields. Valuable trees in the watershed like White Alder (Alnus rhombifolia) and other species were logged out for their wood. By the 1930s, virtually the entirety of the Las Trampas Creek floodplain had been converted to agriculture or housing.

== Current state ==
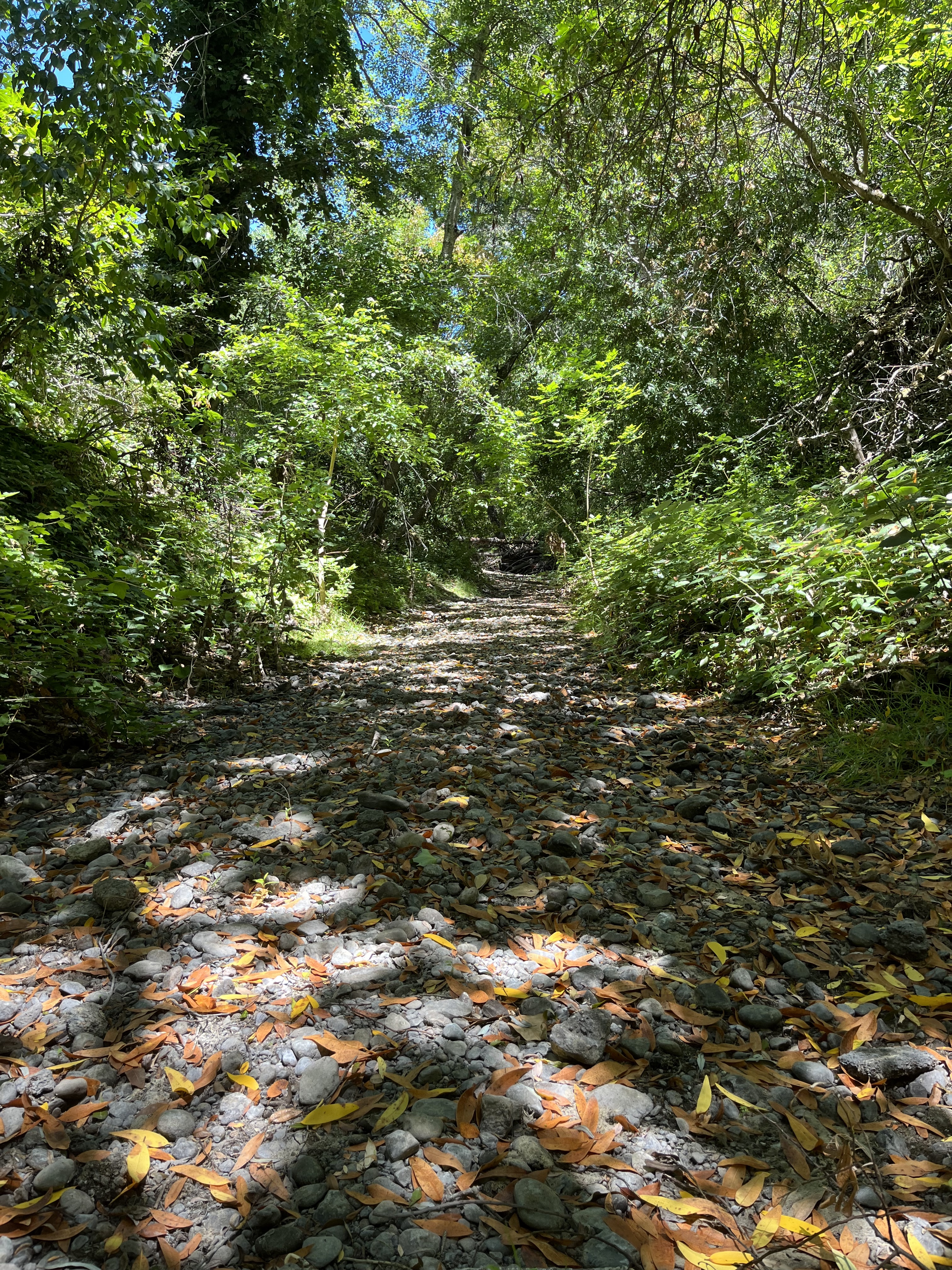
A dry section of Las Trampas Creek during the seasonal drought. The creek may have retained more summer flow before manipulation of its aquifer and floodplain. (July 7th, 2022)

Today, many of the existing springs in the watershed have been diverted for domestic and agricultural use, reducing the overall flow. As a result of this factor and a lack of groundwater recharge, the creek retains little of its flow into the dry season, and the lands about its floodplain are generally quite arid during the summer drought; the main stem of the Las Trampas Creek, however, almost always retains water in pools during the dry season.

As a result of increased erosion and runoff from urban development, much of the channel of Las Trampas Creek is deeply downcut, creating an erosional hazard for the developments along the banks as well as a flooding hazard. With impermeable asphalt covering the majority of the creek's floodplain, a much higher proportion of precipitation flows directly into the channel, increasing the flow and causing the harmful erosion and channel incision.

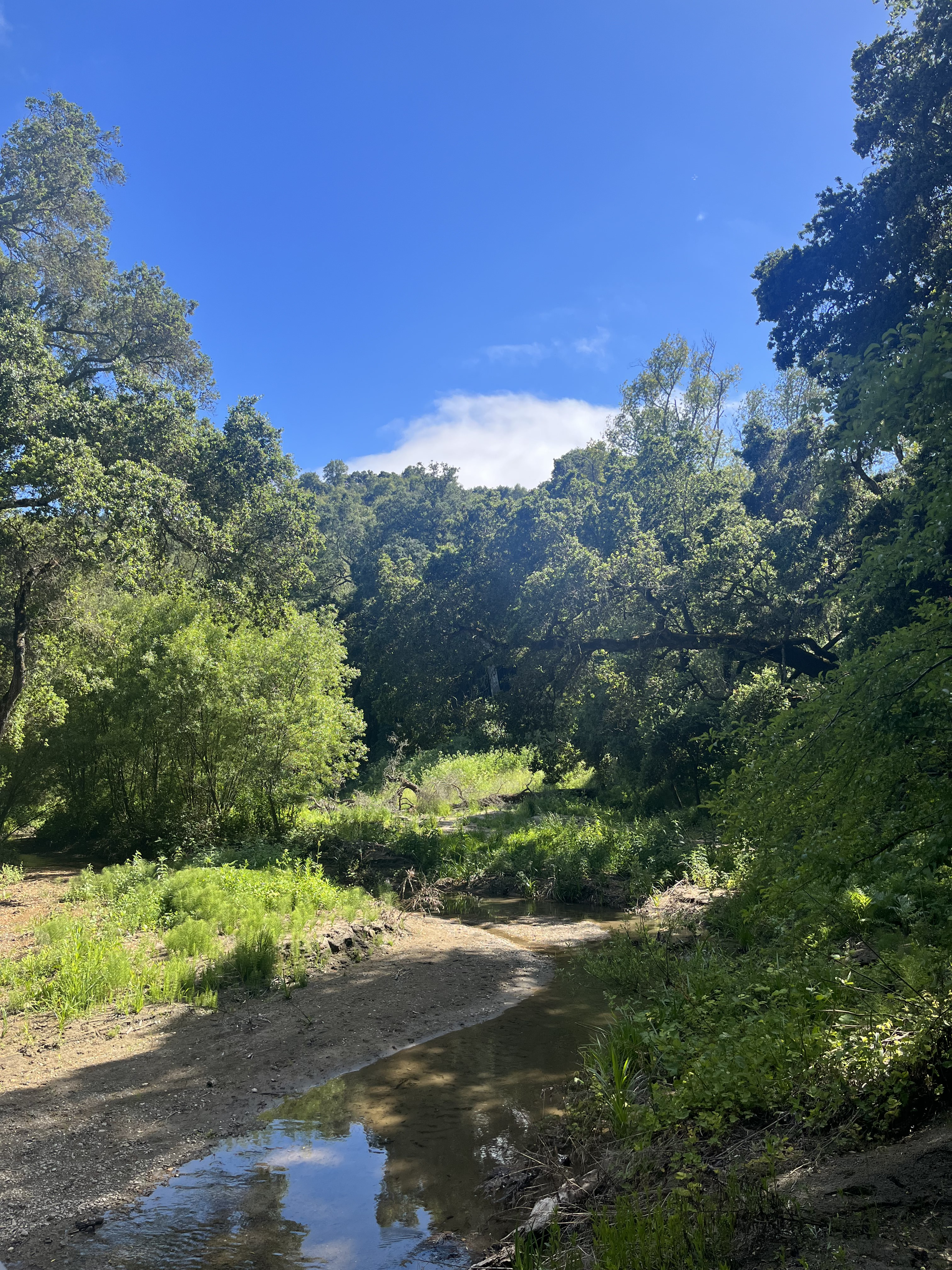
Higher in the watershed, Las Trampas Creek assumes a more natural character

In the wake of a series of major floods in the 1950s and 60s, urban planners in the growing cities surrounding the watershed, with the help of the government, decided to channelize much of Las Trampas creek. From downtown Lafayette to its confluence with San Ramon Creek in Walnut Creek, Las Trampas Creek flows through an earthen flood channel. For the majority of its length, Las Trampas creek is closely paralleled by suburban and urban environments as it courses through the cities of Lafayette and Walnut Creek, California. The heavy channel modifications and severing of its floodplain have greatly altered the character and appearance of Las Trampas Creek from historic times.

The forested canyons of the middle and upper sections of the watershed are less intensely developed, mainly home to ranches and small-holdings properties along Bollinger Canyon Road, as well as land banks. This section of the watershed is composed of heavily forested and very rugged canyons. Bigleaf Maple, White Alder and other riparian trees are common along the stream. Annual grasslands are also common in exposed areas in the upper canyon, and are host to vibrant insect and bird life. Springs that emerge from the rock rush down the numerous gulleys that line the walls of the upper Las Trampas Creek canyon, feeding the stream. Some of the tributary springs are perennial, but most are ephemeral. Wildlife such as turkeys, Columbian black-tail deer and coyotes are commonly encountered.

== History ==
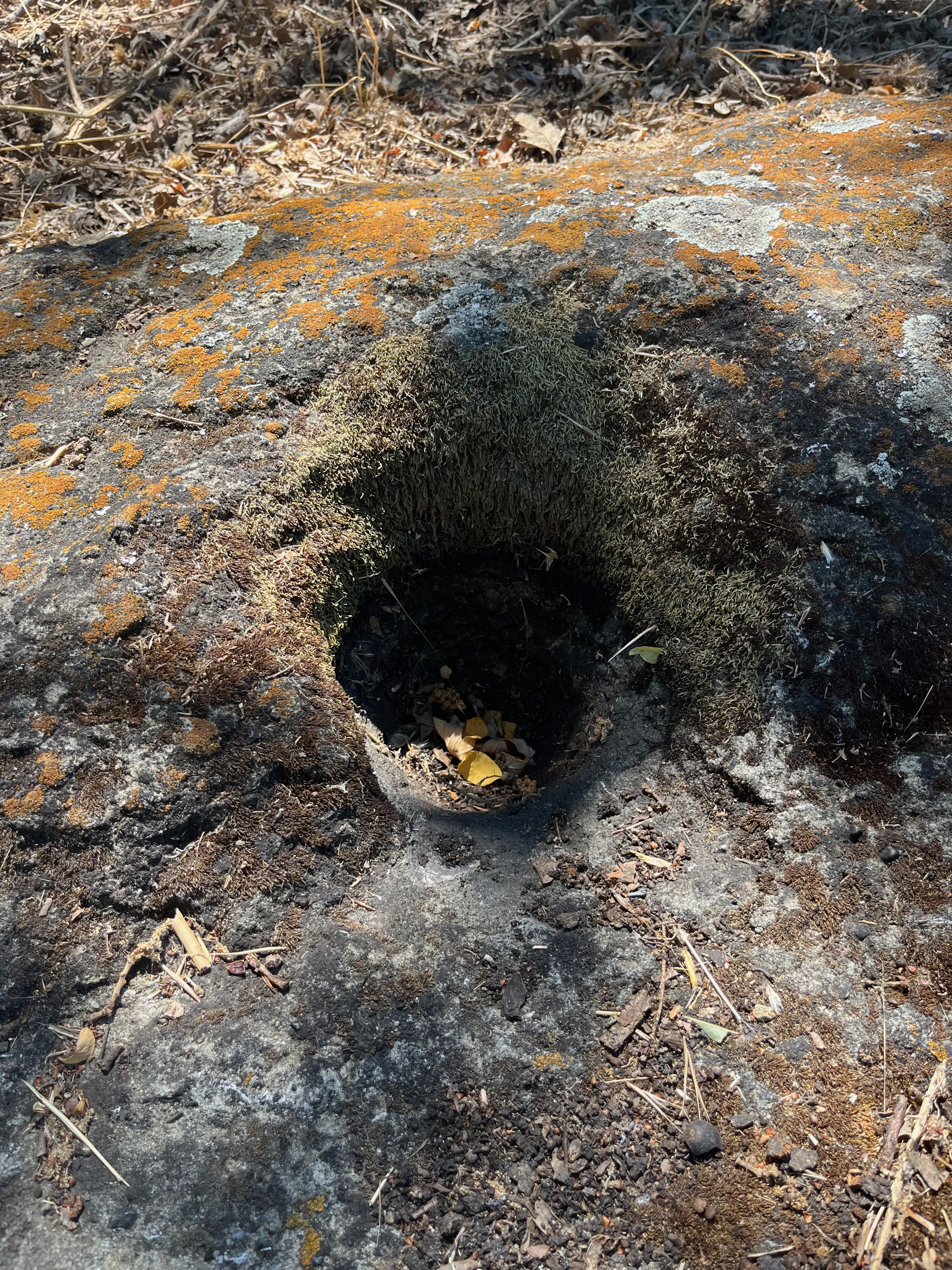
A bedrock mortar at a village site along a tributary to Las Trampas Creek, Tice Creek. This village was the site of a major archaeological dig. (August 10th, 2022)

The human history of the Las Trampas Creek watershed began thousands of years ago when groups of Paleo-Indians made their way into the Bay Area. Some of the earliest evidence of human occupation in what is now California dates to more than 10,000 years before present.

The inhabitants of the Las Trampas Creek watershed at the time of Spanish contact were the Saclan, a member of the Bay Miwok cultural-linguistic group. The Saclan likely arrived in the area encompassing modern-day Lafayette, Moraga and Walnut Creek, California around 700 AD. They lived in several bands inhabiting different watersheds in the area, some of which being on Las Trampas Creek.

These people took advantage of the mild climate and abundance of natural foods provided by the pre-colonization landscape of the Las Trampas Creek watershed. They relied on the creek for water for drinking, bathing and cooking. Las Trampas creek furnished Saclan villages and camps with fish and other riparian resources; game could be reliably hunted along its banks. The mountains at the head of the watershed, namely Rocky Ridge and Las Trampas Peak, are thought to have held spiritual significance to the Saclan and their neighbors.

With the arrival of the first parties of Spanish settlers in the Bay Area in 1776, life began to change for the Saclan. A series of epidemics among the natives of the interior coupled with a drought in the 1790s forced many Saclan to seek refuge at Mission Dolores across the Bay on the San Francisco Peninsula. By about 1806, after years of disease, ecological and social collapse and raids from the Spanish military, the Las Trampas creek watershed and the rest of the Saclan homeland was all but devoid of people.

In 1834, a large portion of the Las Trampas Creek watershed was granted to Joaquin Moraga and his cousin Juan Bernal as part of the Rancho Laguna de los Palos Colorados grant. The Moragas ran cattle in the hills of Las Trampas Creek and the neighboring San Leandro Creek watershed, though only one of their families would settle on the Rancho.

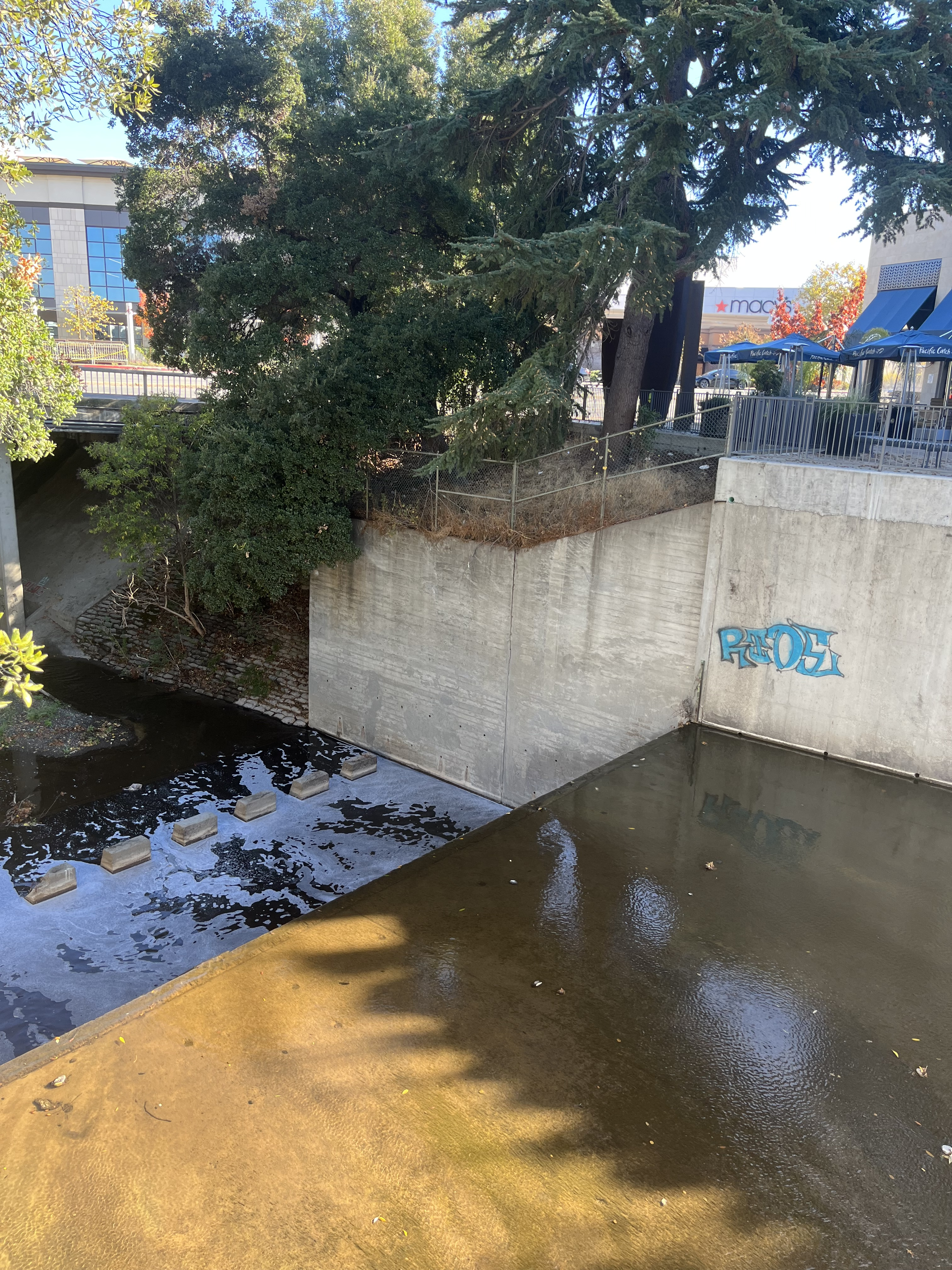
One of several flood control structures on lower Las Trampas Creek built as part of the development of Walnut Creek, CA(November 19th, 2023)

By 1859, the majority of the Rancho was acquired by Horace Carpentier, a noted real estate speculator and developer. Into the late 1800s the Rancho was subdivided by Carpentier among farmers who subsequently planted grain and after the introduction of irrigation technology, orchards of nut and fruit trees. The waters of Las Trampas Creek were harnessed for a number of reasons, mainly irrigation. In the early 1900s, construction at Saint Mary's College required a reliable water source, and so Las Trampas Creek was dammed near the mouth of Bollinger Canyon to create Lake Lasalle.

In 1904, The Sacramento Northern Railway was constructed along a portion of Las Trampas Creek and operated until the mid-1950s, carrying freight and passengers to and from Sacramento and Oakland.

Beginning the 1930s, but greatly expanding during the post World War II housing boom, suburban communities were built along much of the creek, replacing orchards and pastures.
