= Walnut Creek (Contra Costa County) =

Stream in Contra Costa County

Walnut Creek Arroyo de Las Nueces, Arroyo de Los Nogales
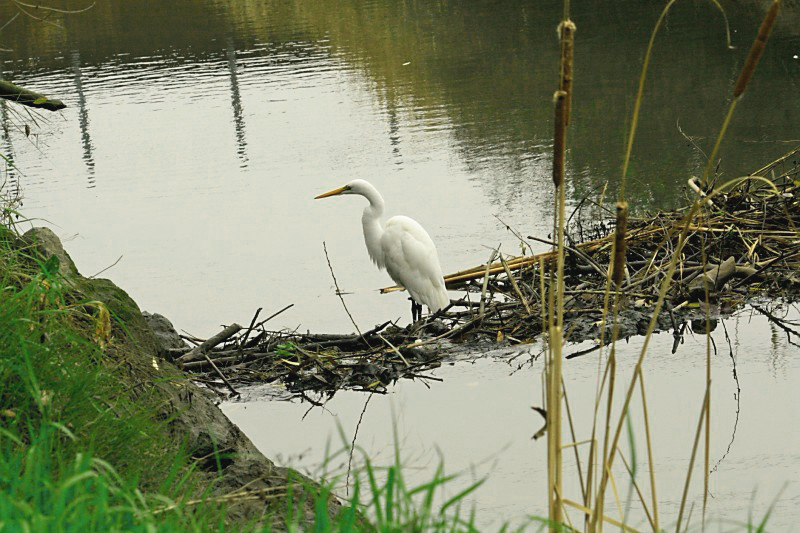
- Secondary beaver dam on lower Walnut Creek provides happy hunting perch for a great egret. Courtesy Cheryl Reynolds, Worth a Dam, 2013

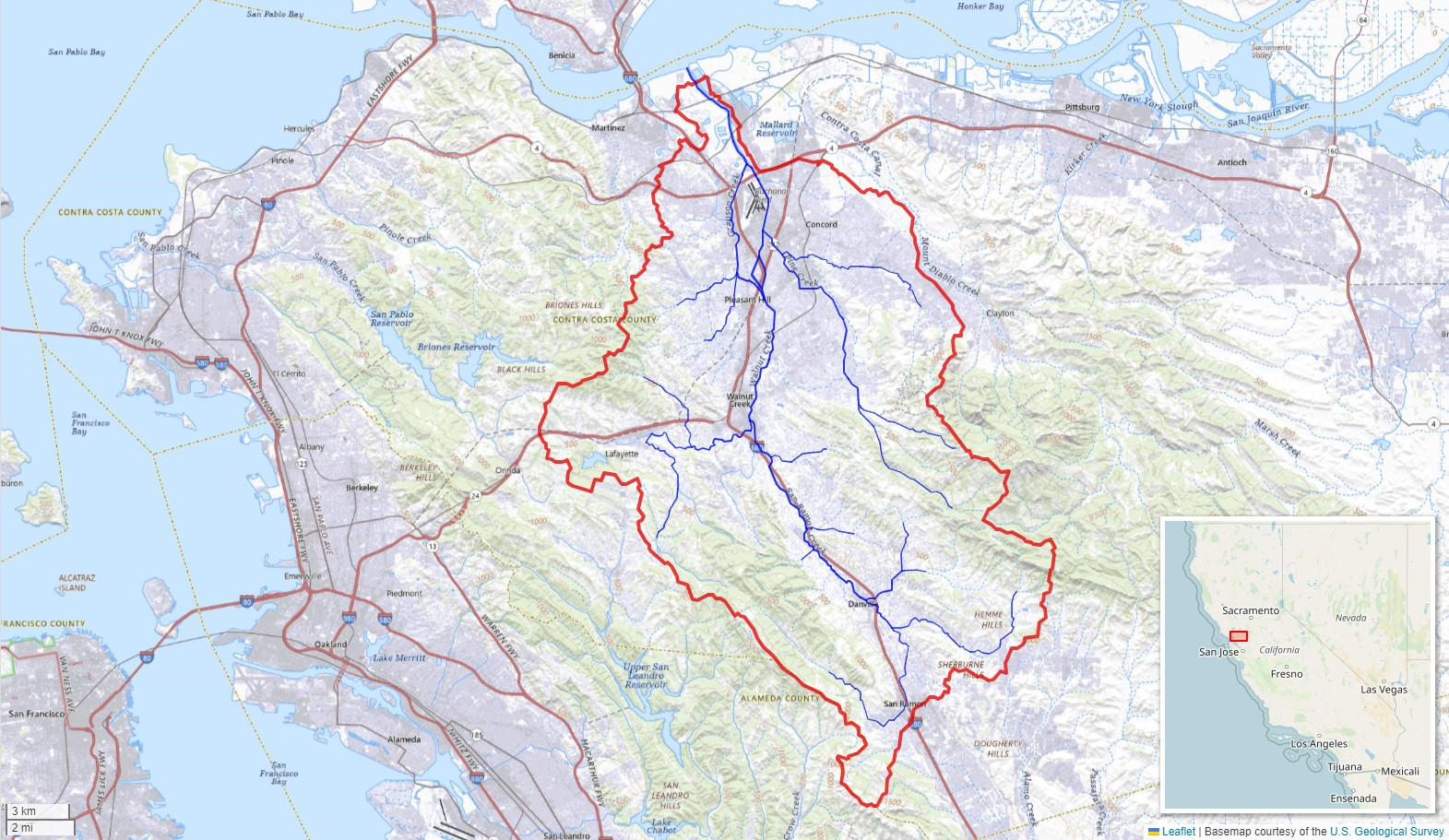
- Walnut Creek watershed (Interactive map)

Location
- Country: United States
- State: California
- Region: Contra Costa County
- Cities: Walnut Creek, Pleasant Hill, Four Corners, Concord, Pacheco, Vine Hill, Mococo, Martinez

Physical characteristics
- Source: Confluence of Las Trampas Creek and Tice Creek
  - location: Walnut Creek, California 375338N 1220335W
  - coordinates: 37°53′38″N 122°3′35″W
  - elevation: 144 ft (44 m)
- Mouth: Suisun Bay
  - location: Martinez, California
  - coordinates: 38°1′27″N 122°4′13″W
  - elevation: 2 ft (0.61 m)
- Basin size: 146 sq mi (380 km^{2})

The Walnut Creek mainstem is a 12.3-mile-long (19.8-kilometer) northward-flowing stream in northern California. The Walnut Creek watershed lies in central Contra Costa County, California and drains the west side of Mount Diablo and the east side of the East Bay Hills. The Walnut Creek mainstem is now mostly a concrete or earthen flood control channel until it reaches Pacheco Creek on its way to Suisun Bay. Walnut Creek was named for the abundant native Northern California walnut trees (Juglans hindsii) which lined its banks historically. The city of Walnut Creek, California was named for the creek when its post office was established in the 1860s.

== History ==
There are three bands of Bay Miwok Native Americans associated with early Walnut Creek, the stream for which the city of Walnut Creek is named: the Saclan, whose territory extended through the hills east of present-day Oakland, Rossmoor, Lafayette, Moraga and Walnut Creek; the Volvon (also spelled Bolbon, Wolwon and Zuicun) near Mt. Diablo; and the Tactan located on the San Ramon Creek in Danville and Walnut Creek.

Today's Walnut Creek is located within the earlier site of four Mexican land grants. One of these land grants – measuring 18,000 acres (73 square kilometers) – belonged to Juana Sanchez de Pacheco, who eventually passed the land down to her two grandsons. Ygnacio Sibrian, one of the grandsons, created the first roofed home in the valley in about 1850. The grant was called Rancho Arroyo de Las Nueces y Bolbones, named after the principal waterway, Arroyo de Las Nueces (Walnut Creek), as well as for the local group of indigenous Americans (Bolbones). The Arroyo de Las Nueces or Arroyo de Los Nogales referred to the plentiful Northern California walnut trees on its banks.

The first town settler was William Slusher, who built a dwelling on the bank of Walnut Creek, which was called "Nuts Creek" by the Americans in 1849.

== Watershed and course ==
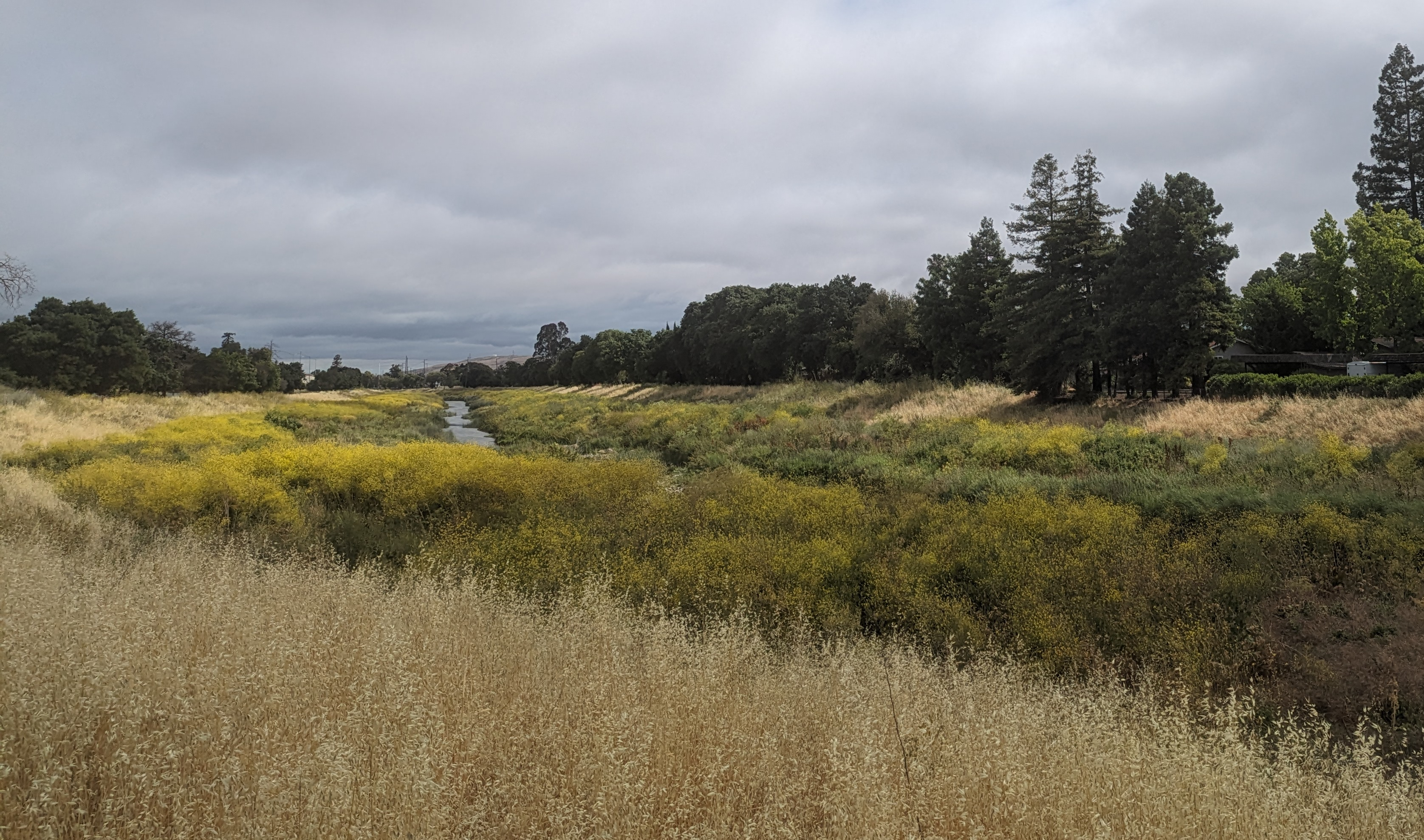
The creek in Concord

The Walnut Creek watershed basin is 146 square miles (380 square kilometers) and consists of five sub-watersheds: the Clayton Valley Drain, Pine Creek Watershed, San Ramon Creek Watershed, Las Trampas Creek Watershed, and Grayson Creek Watershed. While the mainstem Walnut Creek flows through densely urbanized areas, the upper watersheds of its tributaries generally remain undeveloped open space.

Las Trampas Creek drains 27 square miles (70 km^{2}) of Lafayette, Orinda, Moraga, and unincorporated lands in the western Walnut Creek watershed. Lafayette Creek emerges from Lafayette Reservoir to join Las Trampas Creek in Lafayette.

Tice Creek joins Las Trampas Creek from the right (heading downstream) to form the Walnut Creek mainstem. Next, San Ramon Creek joins the mainstem Walnut Creek underground near the intersection of Mount Diablo Boulevard and Broadway.

The San Ramon Creek subwatershed begins at the northern border of the city of San Ramon's border with Danville and flows northwards through the San Ramon Valley. San Ramon Creek begins as Bollinger Creek, which drains the Las Trampas Regional Wilderness. After becoming San Ramon Creek, the two main tributaries of the 54 square miles (140 km^{2}) San Ramon watershed are Green Valley Creek and Sycamore Creek, which drain the western slopes of Mount Diablo.

The next tributary to the Walnut Creek mainstem is Pine Creek, which at 31 square miles (80 km^{2}) is the second largest subwatershed in the basin. Pine Creek drains the west slopes of flows through Mount Diablo State Park, Diablo Foothills Regional Park, and Castle Rock Regional Recreational Area. It is joined by Galindo Creek downstream of Monument Boulevard in Concord, before it joins Walnut Creek. The 9 square miles (23 km^{2}) Clayton Drain drains urbanized Concord through the Clayton Valley. It used to receive flows from Mount Diablo Creek before the latter was diverted into Seal Creek along the east side of the valley. The drain enters the Walnut Creek channel just upstream of Highway 4.

Lastly, Grayson Creek drains the eastern flank of the Briones Hills and its 23 square miles (60 km^{2}) subwatershed includes Murderer's Creek and Hidden Valley Creek. It joins Walnut Creek from the left just downstream of Highway 4. Shortly thereafter, Walnut Creek ends as it joins Pacheco Creek from the right (heading downstream). From that confluence, Pacheco Creek flows north 4 miles (6.4 kilometers) through the Concord Marsh into Suisun Bay.

== Ecology ==
Walnut Creek is one of the few San Francisco Bay Area coastal watersheds that has extant Chinook salmon (Oncorhynchus tshawytscha) spawning and rearing, in its lower watershed. This is consistent with archeological records of both Chinook and coho salmon (Oncorhynchus kisutch) at CCO-309, a site dating to 1400-1500 C.E. about 12 miles (19 km) upstream from Suisun Bay in the Tice Creek Valley in the Walnut Creek watershed.

== See also ==
- List of rivers in California
- List of watercourses in the San Francisco Bay Area
