= Las Trampas Regional Wilderness =

Regional park in California, United States

Coordinates: 37.82°N 122.05°W

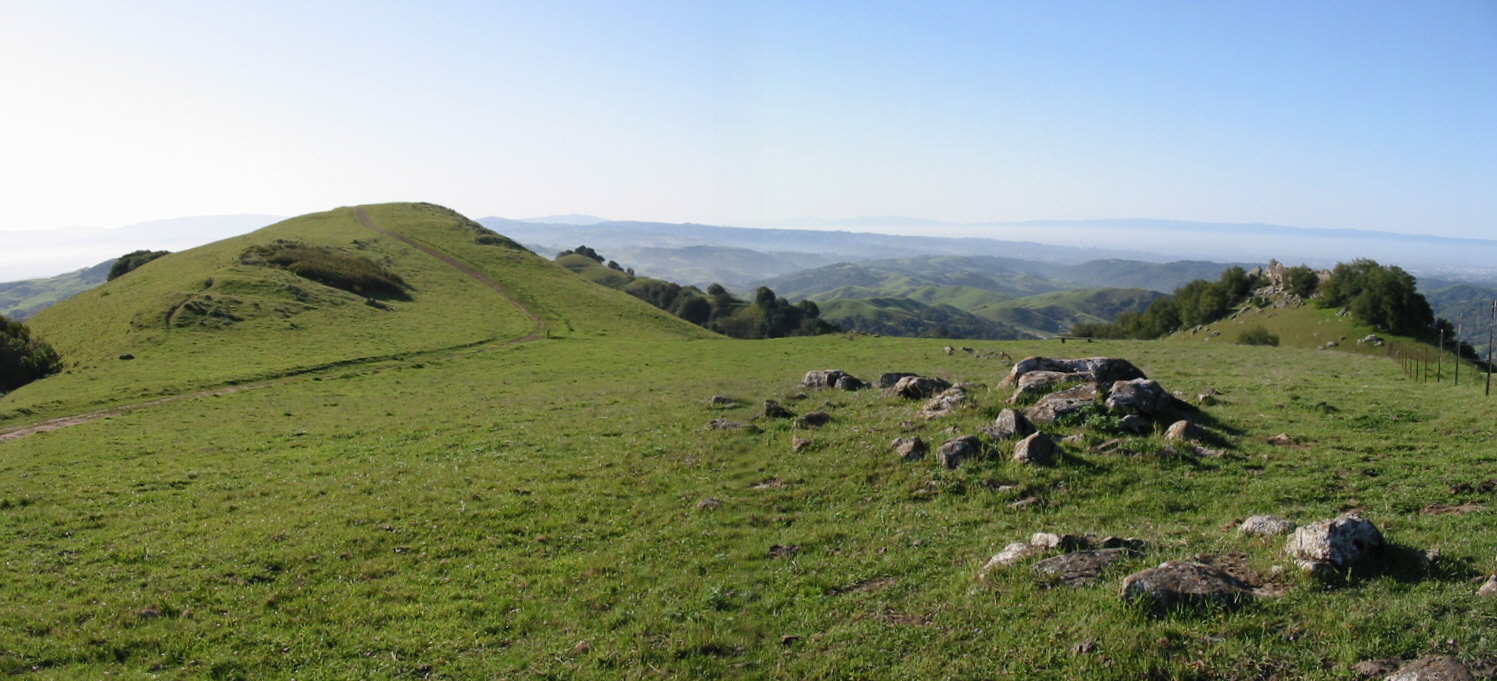
- Panoramic view near the junction of Rocky Ridge and Sycamore trails
- Interactive map of Las Trampas Regional Wilderness
- Type: Regional Wilderness park
- Location: Alameda and Contra Costa Counties, California
- Nearest city: Danville, California
- Area: 5,342-acre (21.62 km^{2})
- Operator: East Bay Regional Park District

Las Trampas Regional Wilderness (Las Trampas, Spanish for "the traps" or "the snares") (Note: EBRPD said that the park name was chosen because historical hunters set traps in the chaparral that covered the hills in order to trap large game such as elk.) is a 5,342-acre (21.62 km^{2}) regional park located in Alameda and Contra Costa counties in Northern California. The nearest city is Danville, California. The park belongs to the East Bay Regional Park District (EBRPD).

== General ==
It consists of two long, hilly ridges (Las Trampas Ridge on the east and Rocky Ridge on the west) flanking a narrow valley along Bollinger Creek, which contains a horse stable and visitor parking. Some of the hiking trails include steep sections; they can involve as much as 900 feet (270 m) of elevation change. (Note: The rugged landscape was largely formed by two major faults - the Los Trampas and the Bollinger faults.) The park has been described as "the tough guy of the East Bay Regional Park District."

Vegetation on the southern and western slopes of the two ridges is predominantly: black sage, chamise and buck brush, with lesser amounts of toyon, hybrid manzanitas, elderberry, gooseberry, chaparral currant, sticky monkeyflower, coffeeberry, coyote bush, poison oak, hollyleaf red berry, deer weed and dozens of other species. Some of the exposed rocks contain compressed layers of fossils.

Rocky Ridge reaches an elevation of 2,024 feet (617 m). At the 1,760 feet (540 m) elevation, there is another trail that leads across EBMUD land. (Note: Las Trampas visitors who wish to use this trail must first obtain a permit from EBMUD. Call 510-287-0459 for more information.) The trail leads to either the Valle Vista Staging Area on Canyon Road in Moraga, or south to the Chabot staging area in Castro Valley.

Chamise and Bollinger Creek Loop trails lead to Las Trampas Ridge, east of Bollinger Creek.The ridge offers good views of the Ygnacio, San Ramon and Amador valleys, as well as Mt. Diablo and the Carquinez Straits.

There are two picnic areas, named Steelhead and Shady, near the parking lot. These are available on a first-come, first served basis and cannot be reserved. Reservable picnic sites for groups of 50 to 300 persons are at the nearby Little Hills Picnic Ranch.

== Trails ==
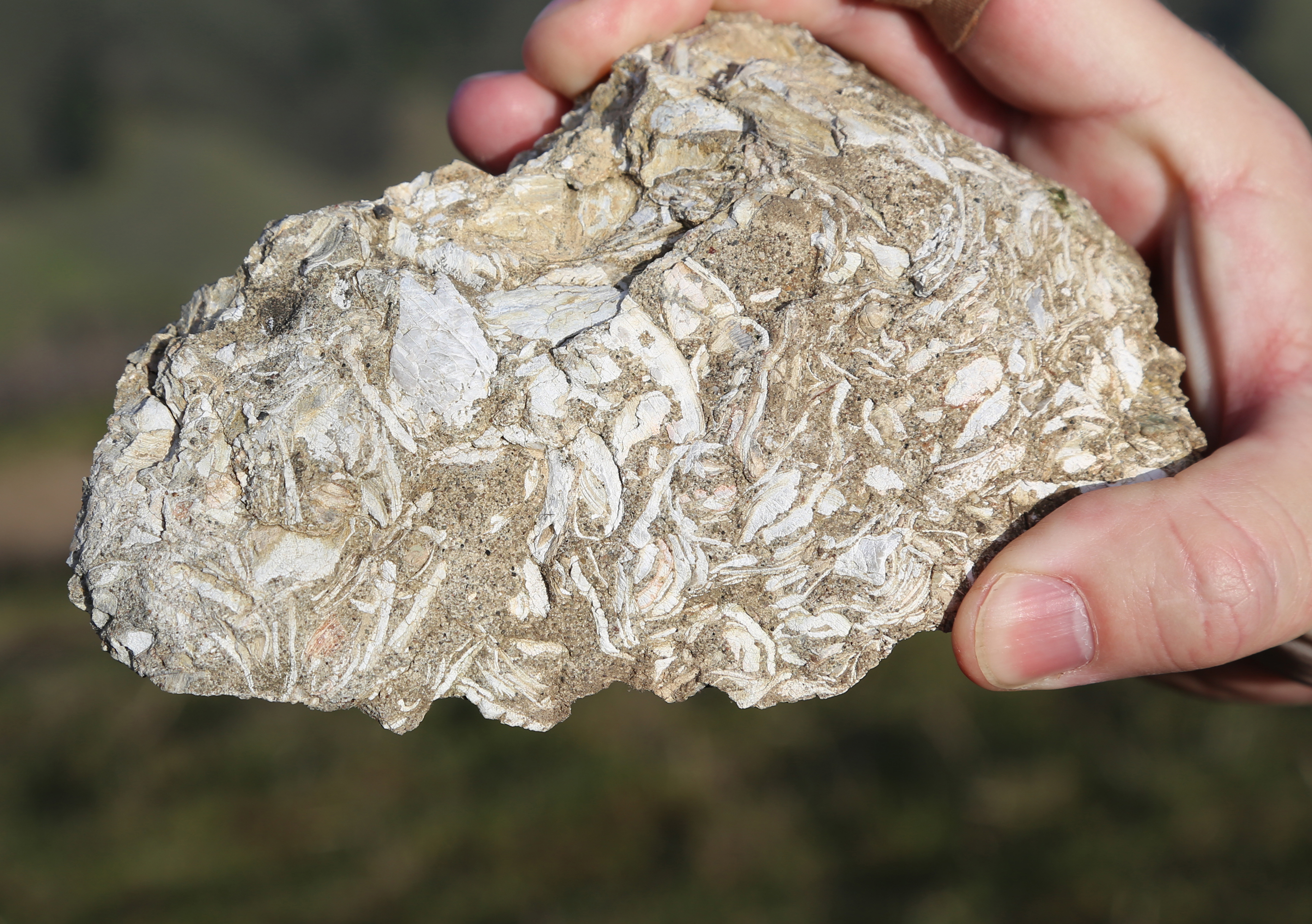
fossils in rock

Bicycles are allowed on half of the trails; equestrians and hikers on all of the trails. Dogs are allowed. Cows, calves, steers and an occasional free-ranging bull can be encountered on the trails; their grazing keeps the grass short for summer fire safety.

The most common trees are California bay laurel and coast live oak. Other species are buckeye, big leaf maple, canyon live oak, black oak and scrub oak. The latter, with its mistletoe, seems to prefer the ridgetop habitat at the end of Chamise Trail.

On its eastern border, the park encloses the triangular property of the Eugene O'Neill National Historic Site on all three sides, with access from Las Trampas via hiking trails or from Danville by single-lane road. The eastern section of the park also contains several secluded waterfalls, most of which are difficult to reach.

== Gallery ==
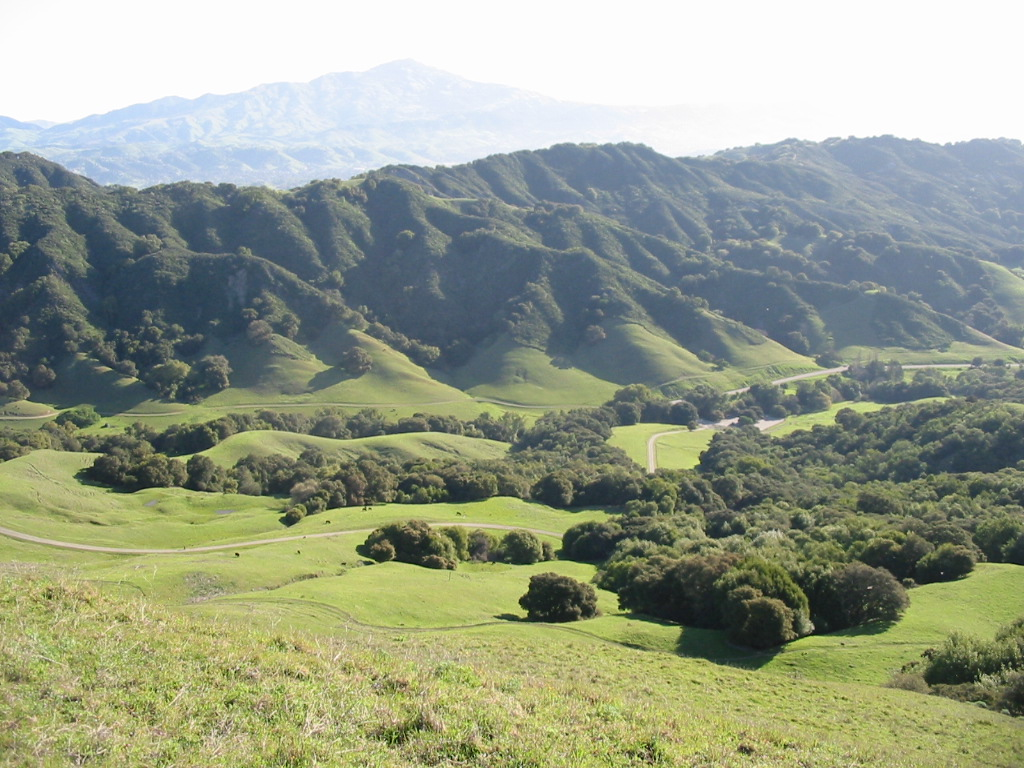
View east from Rocky Ridge toward Las Trampas Ridge. Visitor parking lot is amid the trees at the bottom of the valley. Mount Diablo is in the hazy distance

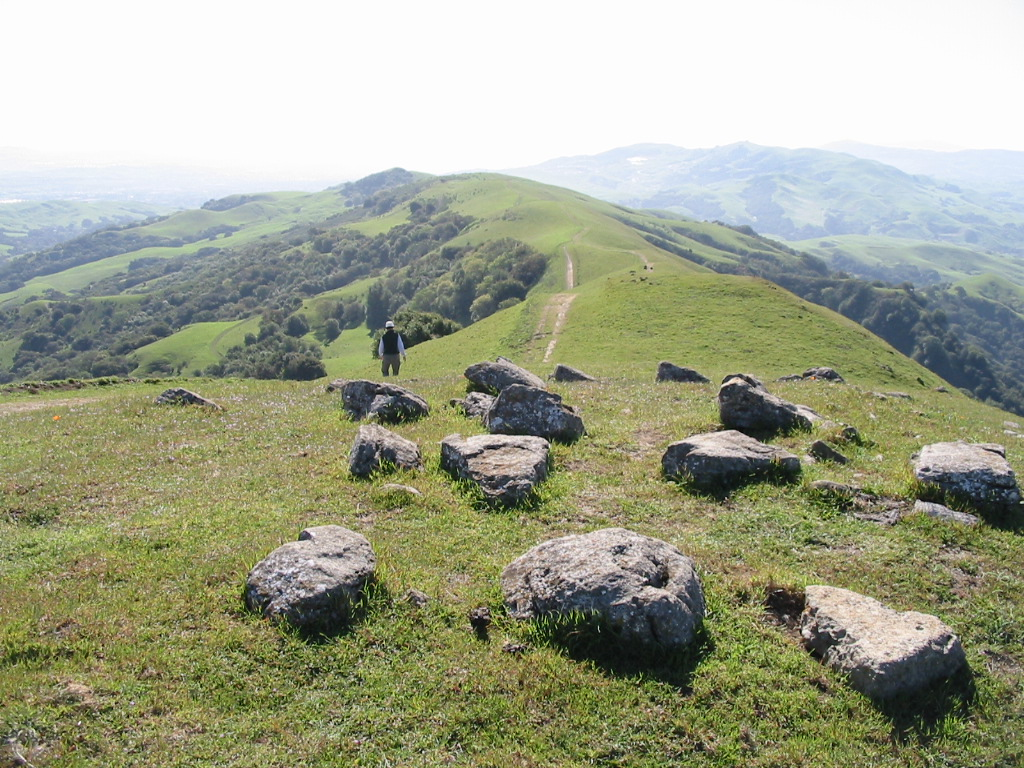
View looking south along Rocky Ridge trail

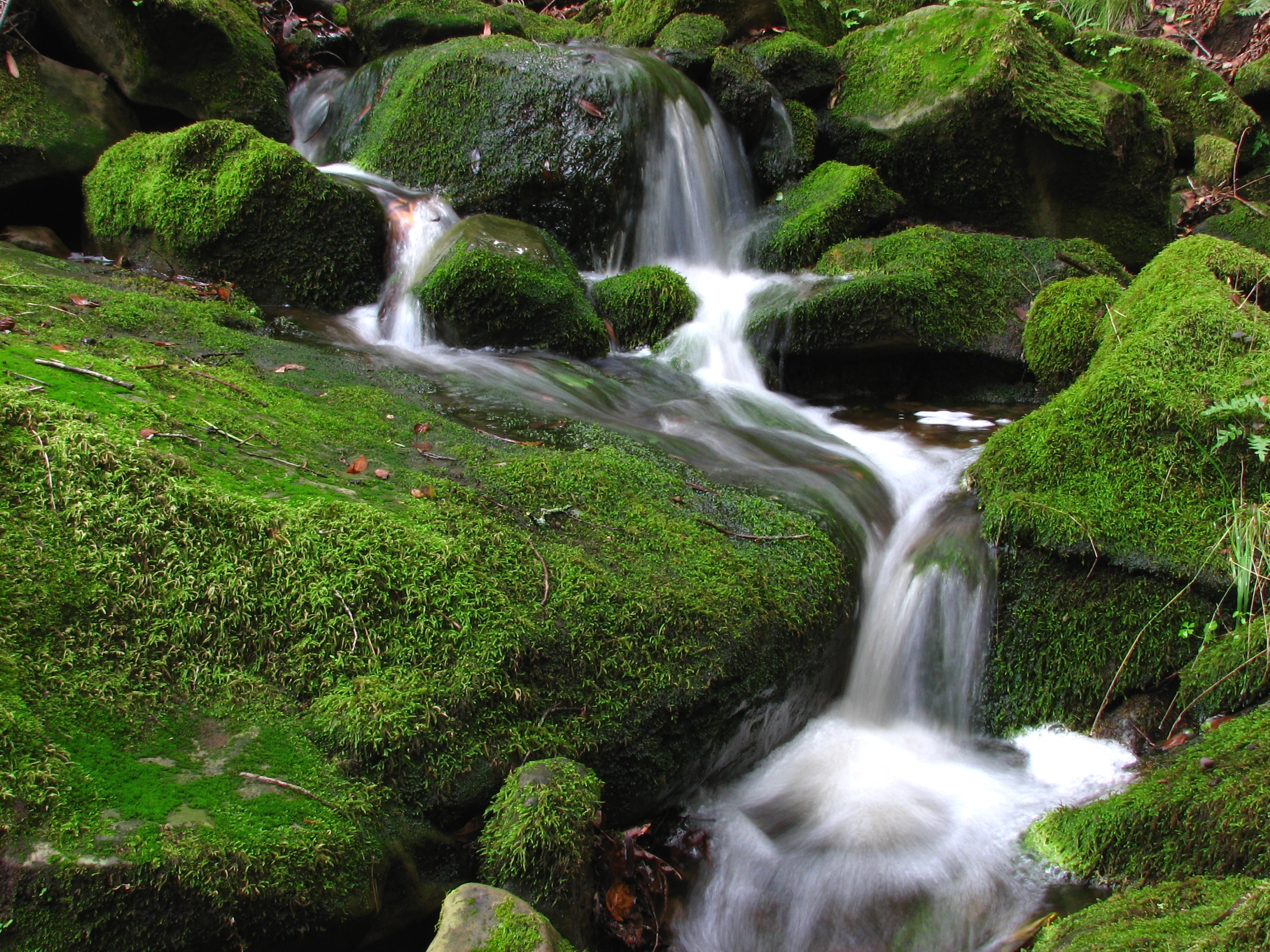
A small cascade in the Las Trampas Regional Wilderness

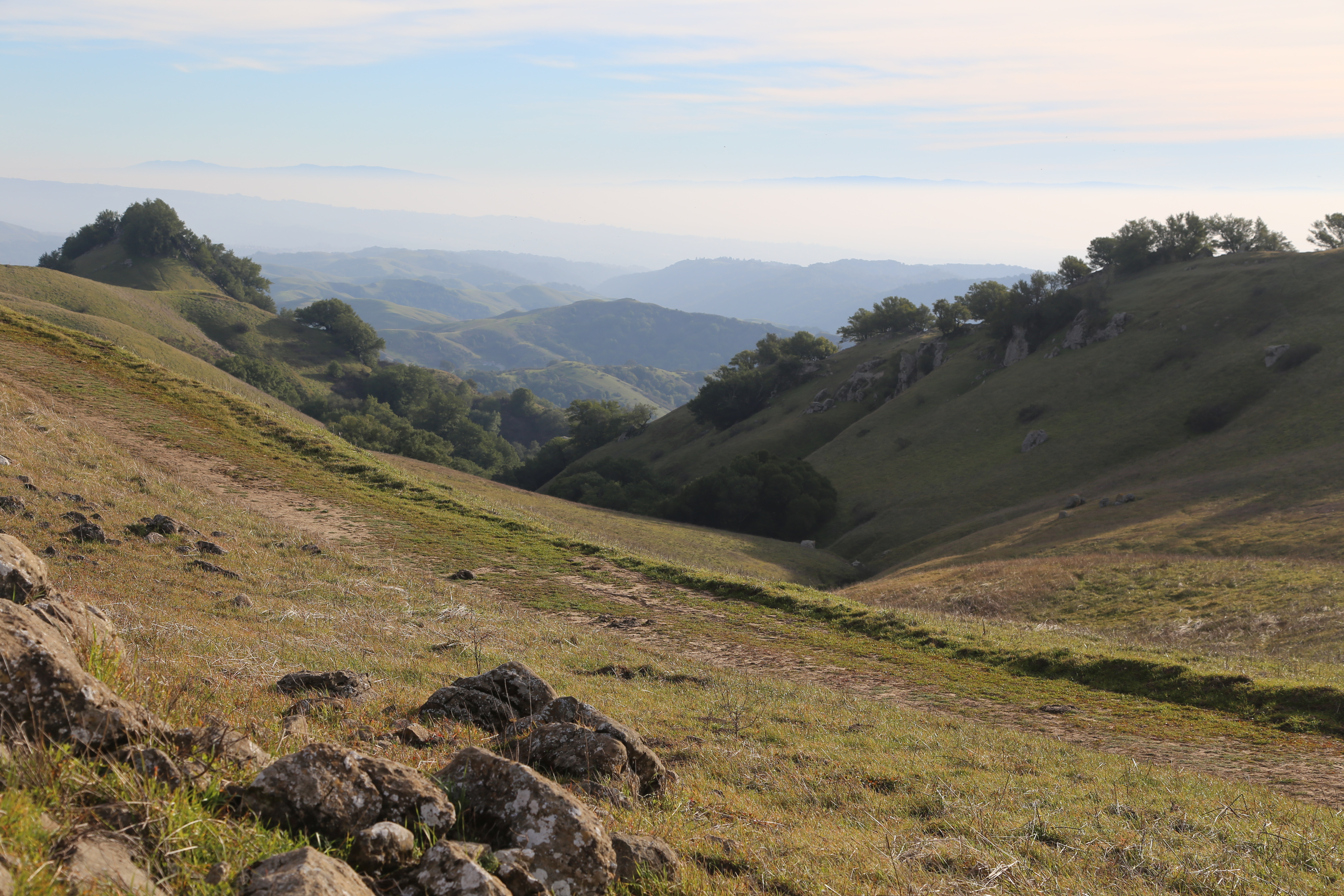
EBMUD watershed, view west toward San Francisco from Rocky Ridge
