= Bay leaf =

Aromatic leaf

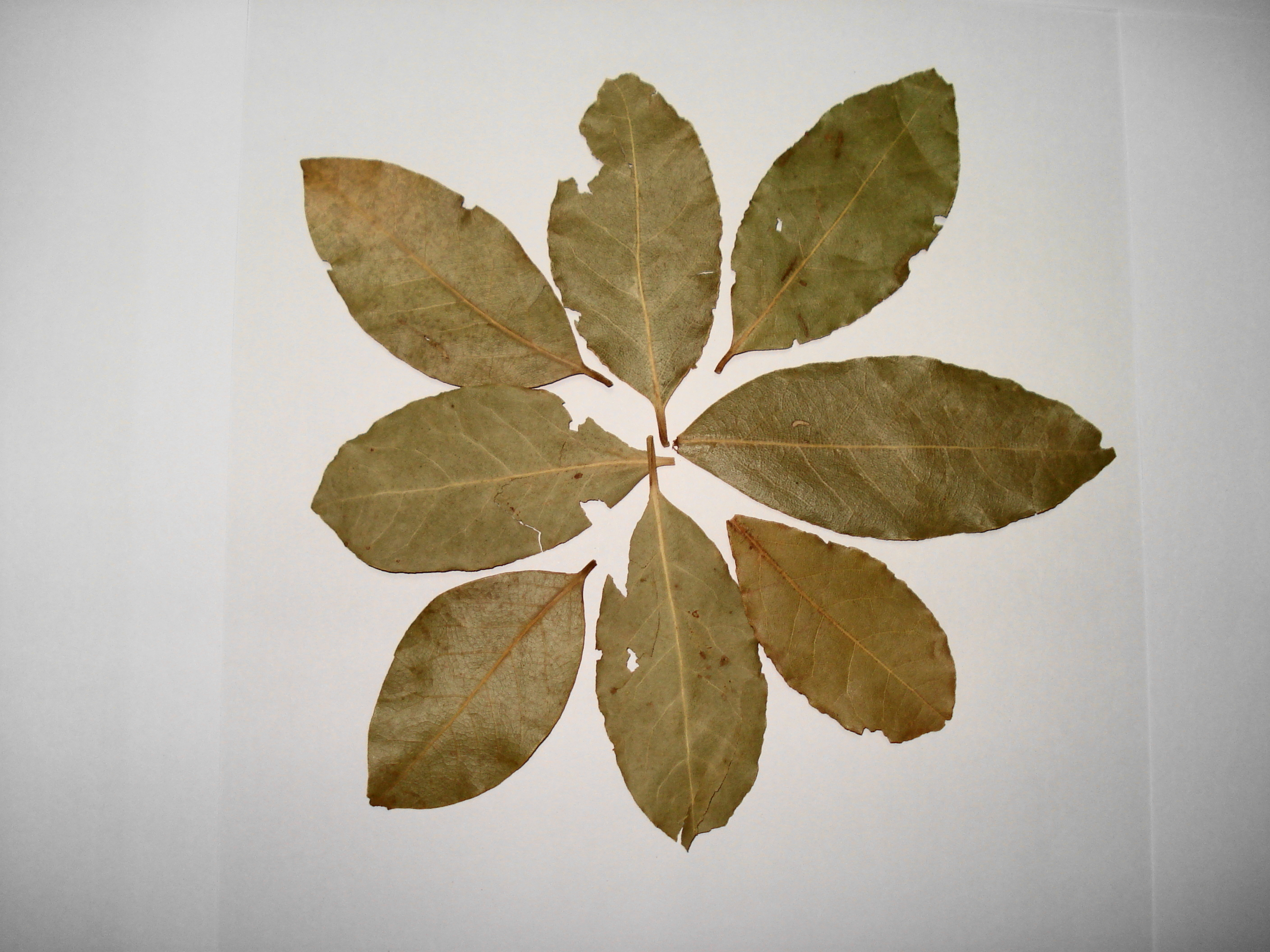
Bay laurel leaves (Laurus nobilis)

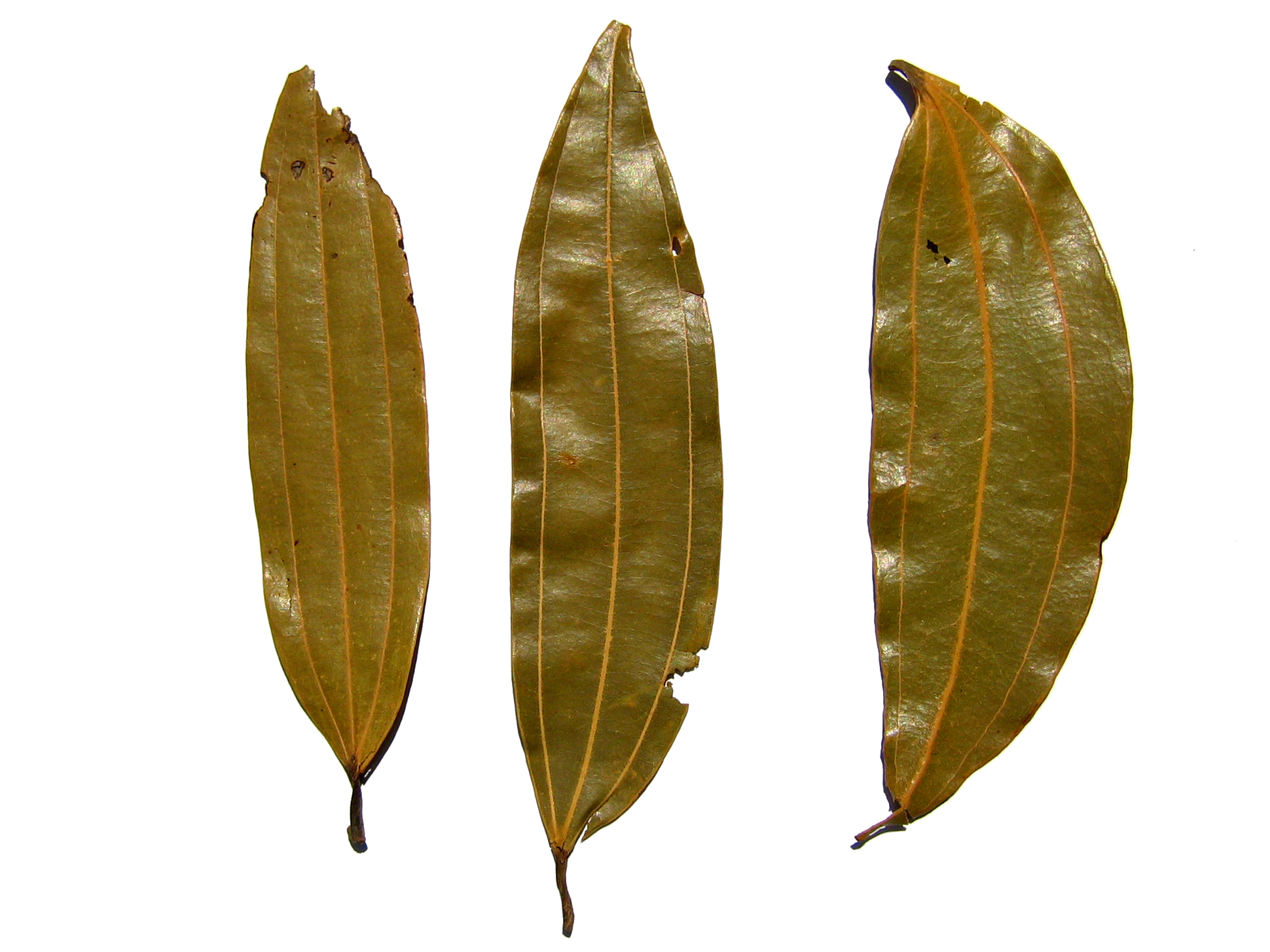
Indian bay leaves (Cinnamomum tamala)

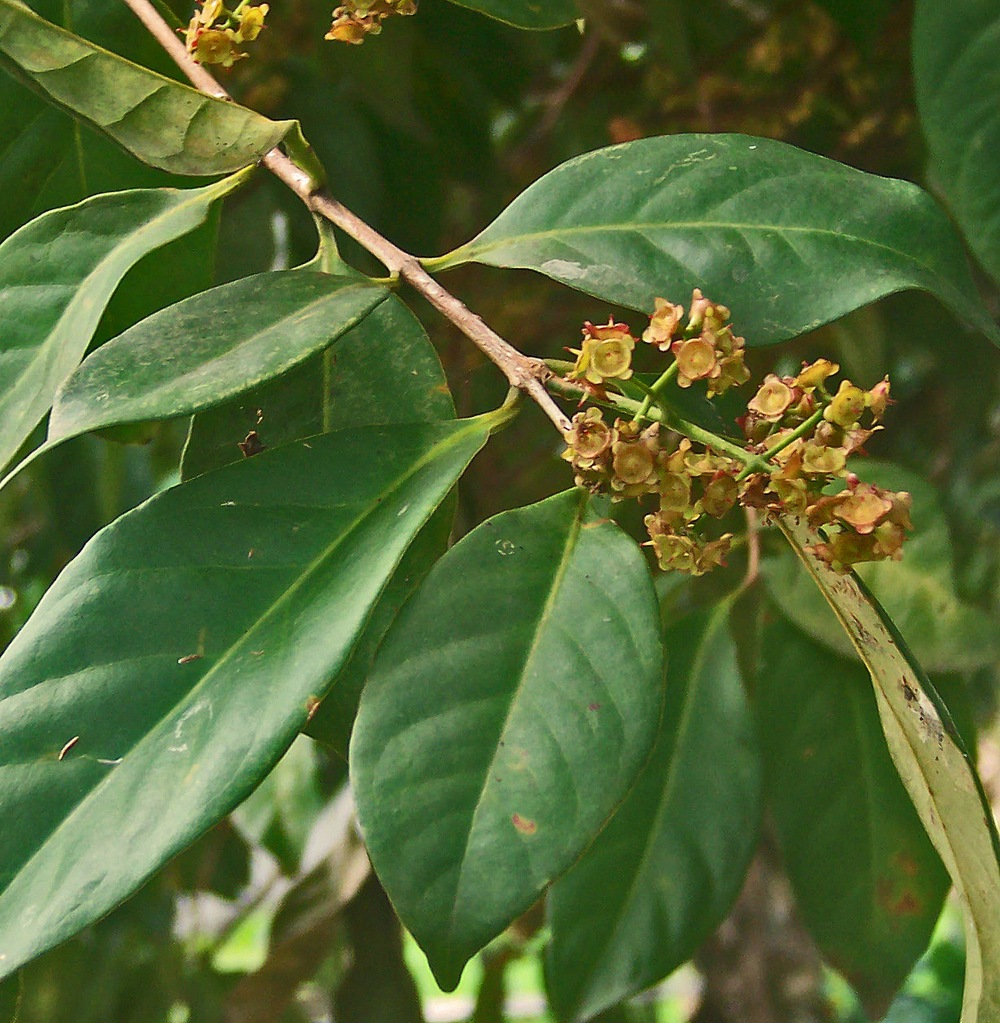
Indonesian bay leaves (Syzygium polyanthum)

Bay leaves are aromatic leaves commonly used as herbs in cooking many world cuisines; They come from various plants of species with distinctive flavours and fragrances as desired of those cuisines. The original English bay refers to the laurel (Laurus nobilis) common in Western especially Mediterranean cuisine. Other unrelated species yet dubbed as bay under similar applications include Umbellularia californica ("California bay laurel"), Cinnamomum tamala in Indian cuisine (hence "Indian bay leaf", or "tejpat"), Syzygium polyanthum ("Indonesian bay leaf"), Pimenta racemosa ("West Indian bay"), and Litsea glaucescens ("Mexican bay leaf").

Bay leaves contain essential oils, such as eucalyptol, terpenes, and methyleugenol, which contribute to their taste and aroma in soups, stews, meat, seafood, and vegetable dishes. These leaves are used whole either dried or fresh while cooking before taken out from dishes before consumption as they can be abrasive in the digestive tract; these leaves are also less commonly used in ground form.

Bay leaves are used as an insect repellent in pantries and as an active ingredient in killing jars for entomology. In Eastern Orthodoxy liturgy, Mediterranean bay laurel are used to symbolize Jesus' destruction of Hades and freeing of the dead.

While some visually similar plants have poisonous leaves, bay leaves are not toxic. However, they remain stiff even after cooking and may pose a choking hazard or cause harm to the digestive tract if swallowed whole or in large pieces. Canadian food and drug regulations set specific standards for bay leaves, including limits on ash content, moisture levels, and essential oil content.

== Sources ==
Bay leaves come from several plants, such as:

- Laurus nobilis (Lauraceae). Fresh or dried bay leaves are used in cooking for their distinctive flavour and fragrance. The leaves should be removed from the cooked food before eating (see safety section below). The leaves are often used to flavour soups, stews, braises and pâtés in many countries. The fresh leaves are very mild and do not develop their full flavour until several weeks after picking and drying.
- Umbellularia californica (Lauraceae): California bay, California laurel, Oregon myrtle, and pepperwood. Leaves are similar to the Mediterranean bay laurel but contains the toxin umbellulone, which can cause methemoglobinemia.
- Cinnamomum tamala (Lauraceae): Indian bay, tejpat or malabathrum. Differs from bay laurel leaves, which are shorter and light- to medium-green in colour, with one large vein down the length of the leaf. Indian bay leaves are about twice as long and wider, usually olive green in colour, and have three veins running the length of the leaf. Culinarily, Indian bay leaves are quite different, having a fragrance and taste similar to cinnamon (cassia) bark, but milder.
- Syzygium polyanthum (Myrtaceae): salam, Indonesian bay or Indonesian laurel. Not commonly found outside Malesia biogeoregion including islands of Indonesia; this herb is applied to meat and, less often, to rice and to vegetables.
- Pimenta racemosa (Myrtaceae): West Indian bay, leaves used culinarily (especially in Caribbean cuisine) and to produce the cologne called bay rum.
- Litsea glaucescens (Lauraceae): Mexican bay leaf

== Chemical constituents ==
The leaves of the European / Mediterranean plant Laurus nobilis contain about 1.3% essential oils (ol. lauri folii), consisting of 45% eucalyptol, 12% other terpenes, 8–12% terpinyl acetate, 3–4% sesquiterpenes, 3% methyleugenol, and other α- and β-pinenes, phellandrene, linalool, geraniol, terpineol, and also contain lauric acid.

== Taste and aroma ==
If eaten whole, Laurus nobilis bay leaves are pungent and have a sharp, bitter taste. As with many spices and flavourings, the fragrance of the bay leaf is more noticeable than its taste. When the leaf is dried, the aroma is herbal, slightly floral, and somewhat similar to oregano and thyme. Myrcene, a component of many essential oils used in perfumery, can be extracted from this bay leaf. They also contain eugenol.

Food writer J. Kenji Lopez-Alt advises boiling bay leaves in a pot of water then tasting the water at five minutes and at an hour to be able to more accurately determine their flavour.

== Uses ==
=== Culinary ===
Bay leaves, especially Mediterranean bay, are typically used whole in cooking to flavor broths, grains, soups, stews and stocks. All leaves are typically removed before serving as they can be abrasive in the digestive tract. .

In Indian cuisine, Western bay leaves are sometimes used in place of Indian bay/tej leaf (tezpattā (तेज़पत्ता, in Hindi), Tejpātā (তেজপাতা) in Bengali, তেজ পাত in Assamese and usually rendered into English as Tej Patta). They are most often used in rice dishes like biryani and as an ingredient in garam masala.

Mediterranean bay leaves were used for flavouring by ancient Greeks. They are a fixture in the cooking of many European cuisines (particularly those of the Mediterranean), as well as in the Americas. They are used in soups, stews, brines, meat, seafood, vegetable dishes, and sauces. The leaves also flavour many classic French and Italian dishes. The leaves are most often used whole (sometimes in a bouquet garni) and removed before serving. In the Philippines, dried bay laurel leaves as introduced by the Spanish have been integrated in several Filipino dishes, such as menudo, beef pares, and adobo. Thai and Laotian cuisine employ bay leaf (Thai: ใบกระวาน, bai kra wān) in a few Arab-influenced dishes, notably massaman curry.

Mediterranean bay leaves can also be crushed or ground before cooking. Crushed leaves impart more fragrance than whole leaves, but are more difficult to remove and thus they are often used in a muslin bag or tea infuser. Ground bay may be substituted for whole leaves and does not need to be removed, but it is much stronger.

To brew tea, bay leaves are best boiled for a brief period—typically 3 minutes—to prevent bitterness, as prolonged boiling may overpower the tea's flavour. Fresh bay leaves impart a stronger aroma, while dried leaves require longer steeping for a similar effect.

Bay leaves are also used in the making of Caribbean jerk chicken. The bay leaves are soaked and placed on the cool side of the grill. Pimento sticks are placed on top of the leaves, and the chicken is placed on top and smoked. The leaves are also added whole to soups, stews, and other Caribbean dishes.

Bay leaves may also be used in desserts such as cakes, cookies, ice creams, puddings and more. They can be baked into the surface of a dessert or tempered in a fat such as milk or butter to release their fat-soluble flavor compounds.

=== Other ===
Bay leaves can also be used scattered in a pantry to repel meal moths, flies, and cockroaches. Mediouni-Ben Jemaa and Tersim 2011 find the essential oil to be usable as an insect repellent.

Bay leaves have been used in entomology as the active ingredient in killing jars for insects smaller than large beetles and similar specimens: crushed, fresh, young leaves are put into the jar under a layer of paper. The vapors they release kill insects slowly but effectively and keep the specimens relaxed and easy to mount, the leaves at the same time discourage the growth of molds. Sampled large beetles and similar specimens that have been killed in cyanide killing jars can be transferred to a laurel jar to await mounting. There is confusion in the literature about whether Laurus nobilis is a source of cyanide to any practical extent, but there is no evidence that cyanide is relevant to its value in killing jars. It certainly is rich in various essential oil components that could incapacitate insects in high concentrations; such compounds include 1,8-cineole, alpha-terpinyl acetate, and methyl eugenol. It also is unclear to what extent the alleged effect of cyanide released by the crushed leaves has been mis-attributed to Laurus nobilis in confusion with the unrelated Prunus laurocerasus, the so-called cherry laurel, which certainly does contain dangerous concentrations of cyanogenic glycosides together with the enzymes to generate the hydrogen cyanide from the glycosides if the leaf is physically damaged.

Mediterranean bay laurels are used in Eastern Orthodoxy liturgy: to mark Jesus' destruction of Hades and freeing of the dead, parishioners throw bay leaves and flowers into the air, letting them flutter to the ground.

== Safety ==
Some members of the laurel family, as well as the unrelated but visually similar mountain laurel and cherry laurel, have leaves that are poisonous to humans and livestock. While these plants are not sold anywhere for culinary use, their visual similarity to bay leaves has led to the oft-repeated belief that bay leaves should be removed from food after cooking because they are poisonous. This is not true; bay leaves may be eaten without toxic effect. However, they remain unpleasantly stiff even after thorough cooking, and if swallowed whole or in large pieces they may pose a risk of harming the digestive tract or causing choking. Thus, most recipes that use bay leaves will recommend their removal after the cooking process has finished.

=== Canadian food and drug regulations ===
The Canadian government requires that ground bay leaves contain no more than 4.5% total ash material, with a maximum of 0.5% of which is insoluble in hydrochloric acid. To be considered dried, they must contain 7% moisture or less. The oil content cannot be less than 1 millilitre per 100 grams of the spice.
