= Sabulodes packardata =

Scientific classification
- Kingdom: Animalia
- Phylum: Arthropoda
- Clade: Pancrustacea
- Class: Insecta
- Order: Lepidoptera
- Family: Geometridae
- Genus: Sabulodes
- Species: S. packardata

Binomial name
- Sabulodes packardata Brehm et al, 2019

Synonyms
- Enypia packardata (Taylor, 1906)

Species of moth

Sabulodes packardata, Packard's girdle moth, is a member of the family Geometridae. Formerly named Enypia packardata, the species was reclassified in 2019. It is found in western North America.

== Description ==
Wingspan 32–36 mm. Adult moths have a light brownish-gray ground color with dark speckling, a dash-shaped discal spot, and prominent Antemedial and postmedial lines. The PM line is a zig-zagging mix of jagged and rounded points, angled diagonally from inner margin toward the apex and reaching the costa edge of the wing in the apical area. The hindwing is paler with a dark, sinuous PM line.

== Life cycle ==
One generation of larvae are born per year. Females lay about 55 eggs on foliage. Larvae emerge about two weeks later and feed until onset of cold weather. It overwinters as a fourth or fifth-instar larva. The larva resume feeding in spring and continues until May or June. The pupal stage lasts about 21 days and occurs between May and July. Adults fly in late spring and summer.

The caterpillar has a brown head with a cream-colored herringbone pattern on each lobe, a bright green body with a thin dark green middorsal stripe, a white subdorsal stripe and a white spiracular stripe. Larva reach a length of 25 mm.

== Host plants ==
Sabulodes packardata feeds conifer trees, particularly Douglas-fir (Pseudotsuga menziesii), Grand Fir (Abies grandis), and western hemlock (Tsuga heterophylla). Other hosts include amabilis fir, western red cedar, sitka spruce, mountain hemlock

== Similar species ==
- Enypia griseata: The forewing is darker with heavier speckling and a smoother PM line.
- Enypia venata: The forewing has a large "tooth" projecting from the AM line to the discal spot, and a heavily "spined" or "thorny" PM line.
- Nepytia species have a sinuate PM line that curves basally before meeting costa in subapical area.
- Cingilia catenaria has a sinuate PM line that curves basally before meeting costa in subapical area.

== External links and photos ==
- Bug Guide
- Moth Photography Group
- iNaturalist
- Barcode of Life
