= Ophiorrhabda mormopa =

Scientific classification
- Kingdom: Animalia
- Phylum: Arthropoda
- Clade: Pancrustacea
- Class: Insecta
- Order: Lepidoptera
- Family: Tortricidae
- Genus: Ophiorrhabda
- Species: O. mormopa

Binomial name
- Ophiorrhabda mormopa (Meyrick, 1906)

Synonyms
- Argyroploce mormopa Meyrick, 1926; Hedya mormopa Diakonoff, 1968; Lasiognatha mormopa Meyrick, 1906; Olethreutes melanocycla Common, 1970; Olethreutes mormopa Clarke, 1958; Ophiorrhabda melanocycla Common, 1970; Platypeplus mormopa Meyrick, 1906

Species of moth

Ophiorrhabda mormopa is a moth of the family Tortricidae first described by Edward Meyrick in 1906. It is found in Thailand, the Philippines, India, Sri Lanka, Sumatra, Borneo and Australia.

Larval host plants are Syzygium jambos and Syzygium polyanthum.
