= Quercus macdougallii =

Conservation status
- Endangered (IUCN 3.1)

Scientific classification
- Kingdom: Plantae
- Clade: Embryophytes
- Clade: Tracheophytes
- Clade: Spermatophytes
- Clade: Angiosperms
- Clade: Eudicots
- Clade: Rosids
- Order: Fagales
- Family: Fagaceae
- Genus: Quercus
- Subgenus: Quercus subg. Quercus
- Section: Quercus sect. Quercus
- Species: Q. macdougallii

Binomial name
- Quercus macdougallii Martínez

Species of oak tree

Quercus macdougallii is a species of plant in the family Fagaceae. It is placed in section Quercus.

== Description ==
Quercus macdougallii is a large evergreen tree, growing from 20 to 35 meters high at maturity, with trunk up to about one meter in diameter. It is placed in section Quercus.

== Distribution and habitat ==
The tree is endemic to Oaxaca state in southwestern Mexico. It grows in Sierra Madre de Oaxaca pine-oak forests habitat in the Sierra Juárez, a subrange of the Sierra Madre de Oaxaca.

Quercus macdouglallii is found in high-elevation oak forests and in mixed oak-pine or pine-oak forests between 2,500 and 3000 meters elevation. It is generally found in association with the trees Quercus laurina, Pinus ayacahuite, Pinus hartwegii, Pinus patula, Litsea glaucescens, Clethra hartwegii, Gaultheria acuminata, and Quercus crassifolia.

== Conservation ==
Quercus macdougallii is endemic to a small area of the Sierra Juárez. Its total population is estimated at 500 mature individuals. It is threatened by habitat loss from deforestation and fire, and its habitat is not in a designated protected area. It is assessed as Endangered.
