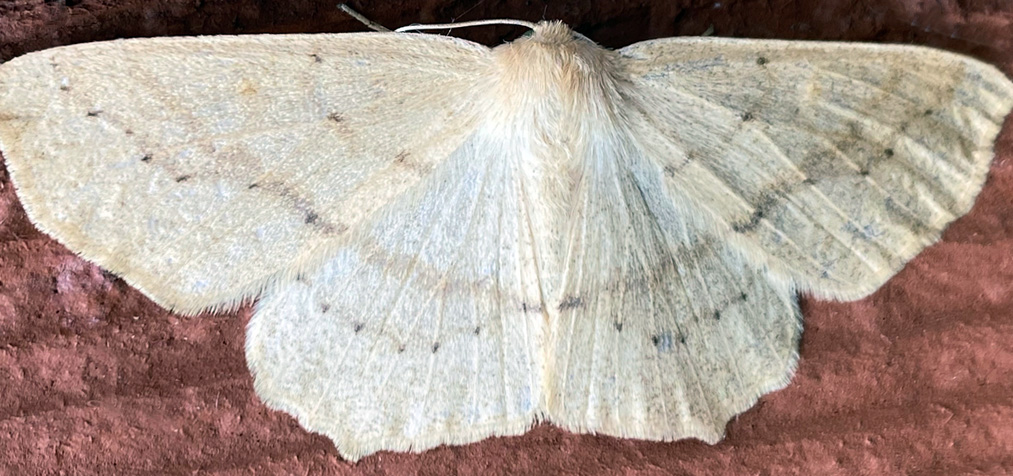

Scientific classification
- Kingdom: Animalia
- Phylum: Arthropoda
- Clade: Pancrustacea
- Class: Insecta
- Order: Lepidoptera
- Family: Geometridae
- Genus: Sabulodes
- Species: S. aegrotata

Binomial name
- Sabulodes aegrotata (Guenée, 1857)

Synonyms
- Tetracis aegrotata (Guenée, 1858); Ennomos arsesaria (Walker, 1860); Sabulodes cottlei (Barnes & Benjamin, 1926)

= Sabulodes aegrotata =

Species of moth

Sabulodes aegrotata, the Omnivorous Looper, is a moth of the family Geometridae. It is found in Western North America, from British Columbia to California. The larvae eat a wide variety of flowering trees and plants including some agricultural crops. Its distinguishing feature is that the medial and postmedial lines intersect near the trailing edge of the wing.

== Range and Habitat ==
This moth is common in damp coastal forests along the west coast of North America from British Columbia to California.

== Life Cycle ==
This species has three generations per year in coastal areas and four or five generations in inland locations. Depending on temperature, egg-to-adult development takes 2 to 5 months. Eggs are barrel-shaped, light green to reddish brown with a ring of tiny projections. Eggs are laid in clusters on leaves of the host plants and hatch after 8 or 9 days. When mature caterpillars are ready to pupate, they make pearly white to brown cocoons, hidden in between leaves. Pupation lasts 1 to 4 weeks.

The larva make shelters from silk and folded leaves where they shelter during the day and come out at night to feed. The University of California IPM Program gives a description of the caterpillar: “Young omnivorous looper larvae are pale yellow caterpillars. Older larvae grow to about 2 inches long and are yellow to pale green or pink, with dark brown, black, or green lines along the sides and a gold-colored head. In addition to the three pairs of legs behind the head, omnivorous loopers have two pairs of prolegs (leglike appendages) near the rear on abdominal segments 6 and 10.”

== Adult ==
This species is variable in color, including a melanic form. Rindge observed that “The greatest amount of variation is found in the San Francisco Bay area, [...while] The moths from southern California are relatively uniform.”

The forewing ground color can be cream, tan, brown or gray, and is usually covered in dark brown speckling. There are three transverse lines (antemedial, medial, and postmedial) with brown dots at each vein. Sometimes the crosslines are faint and only the dots are visible. The antemedial line, if present, is curved. The medial and postmedial lines intersect near the trailing edge. The apex of the forewings is slightly hooked.

The hindwing is the same color as the forewing. The medial line is at the same level as the medial line of the forewing, but the postmedial line is lower and curved. The medial and postmedial lines meet near the trailing edge. The outer margin of the hindwing has a small projection at the middle vein.

The head and thorax are usually the same color as the wings, giving the appearance of a seamless transition from body to wing. (But can be a contrasting color in dark or light variations.) The head is set low with only the tip of the head protruding past the wings.

Forewing length is 17 to 26 mm. Wingspan is 35–44 mm. Adults are on wing year round and are active at night.

== Host Plants ==
The polyphagous larvae feed on at least 27 different families of flowering trees, shrubs, and ornamental plants including Alder (Alnus), acacia, California buckeye (Aesculus californica), chestnut (Castanea), elm (Ulmus), ivy (Hedera), eucalyptus, ginkgo, magnolia, maple (Acer), oceanspray (Holodiscus discolor), Salmonberry (Rubus spectabilis), Toyon (Heteromeles), Willow (Salix), and Bay laurel (Umbellularia californica). Sabulodes aegrotata is considered a minor agricultural pest. It feeds on commercial crops including walnuts, avocados and citrus.

== Predators ==
Sabulodes aegrotata is eaten by birds, assassin bugs, lacewing larvae and spiders. Trichogamma platneri wasps and Telenomus hugi wasps parasitize their eggs and larvae, respectively.

== Gallery ==
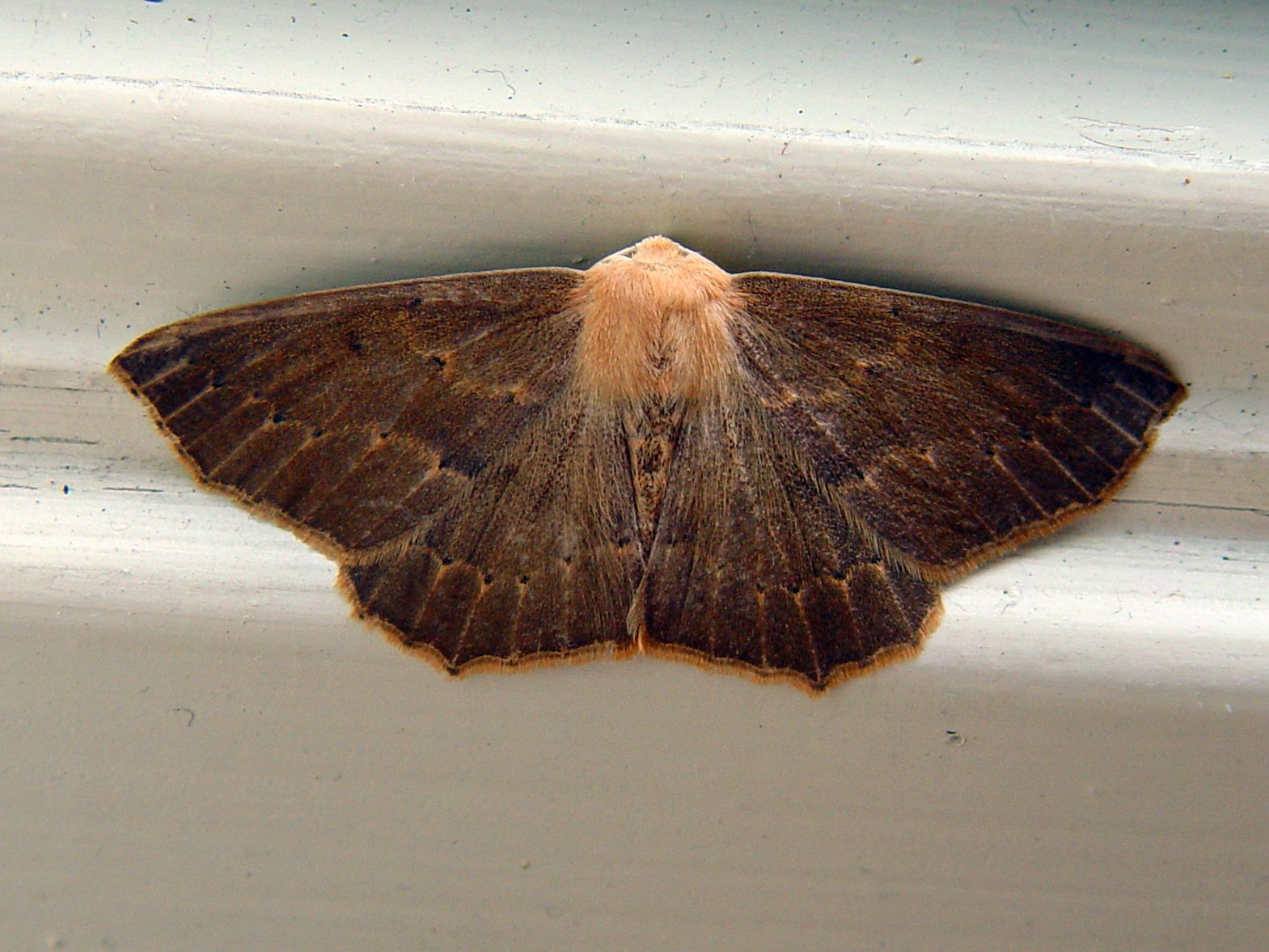
Dark variation

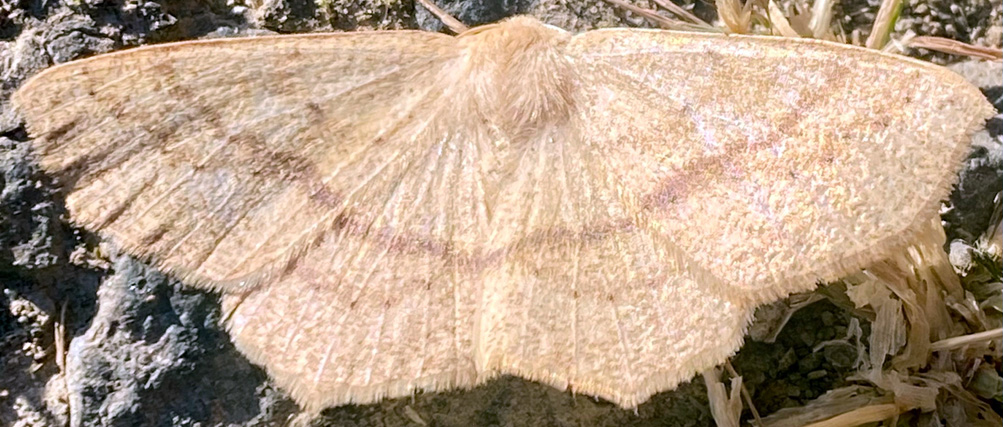
Light variation

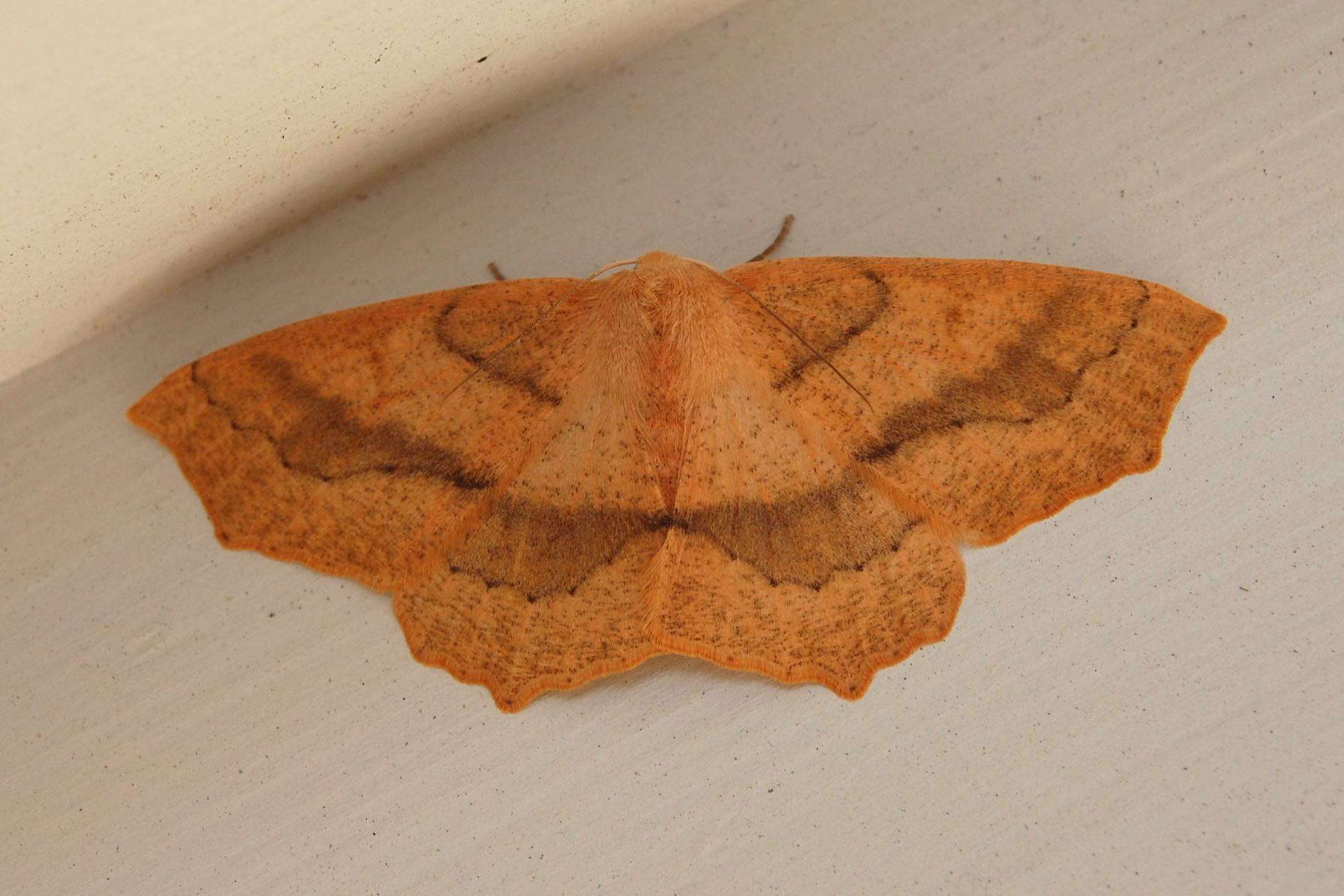
Shaded variation

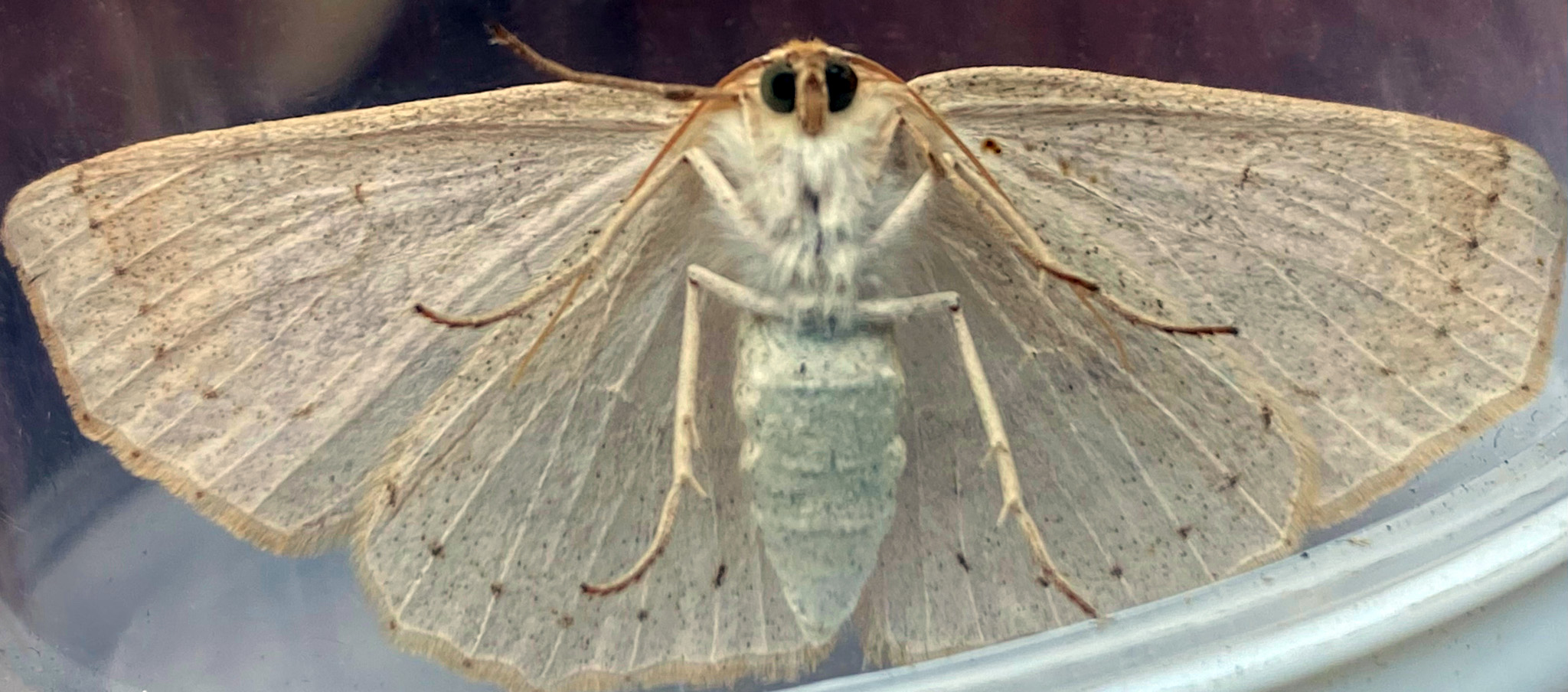
Sabulodes aegrotata, view from below

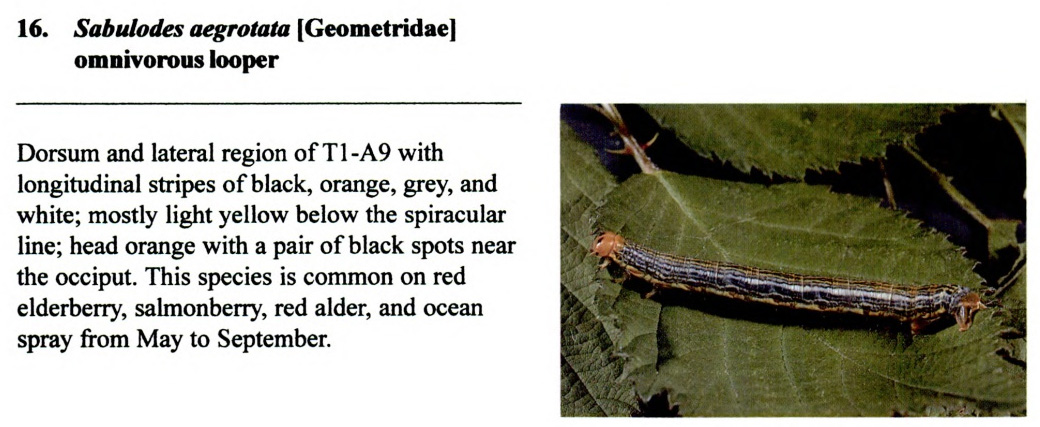
S. aegrotata caterpillar

== External links and photos ==
- Moth Photographers Group
- Bug Guide
- iNaturalist
- Sabulodes aegrotata: 10,000 Things of the Pacific Northwest
