= Ophiorrhabda philocompsa =

Scientific classification
- Kingdom: Animalia
- Phylum: Arthropoda
- Class: Insecta
- Order: Lepidoptera
- Family: Tortricidae
- Genus: Ophiorrhabda
- Species: O. philocompsa

Binomial name
- Ophiorrhabda philocompsa (Meyrick, 1921)

Synonyms
- Argyroploce philocompsa Meyrick, 1921; Didrimys philocompsa

Species of moth

Ophiorrhabda philocompsa is a moth of the family Tortricidae. It is found in Thailand and Java.
