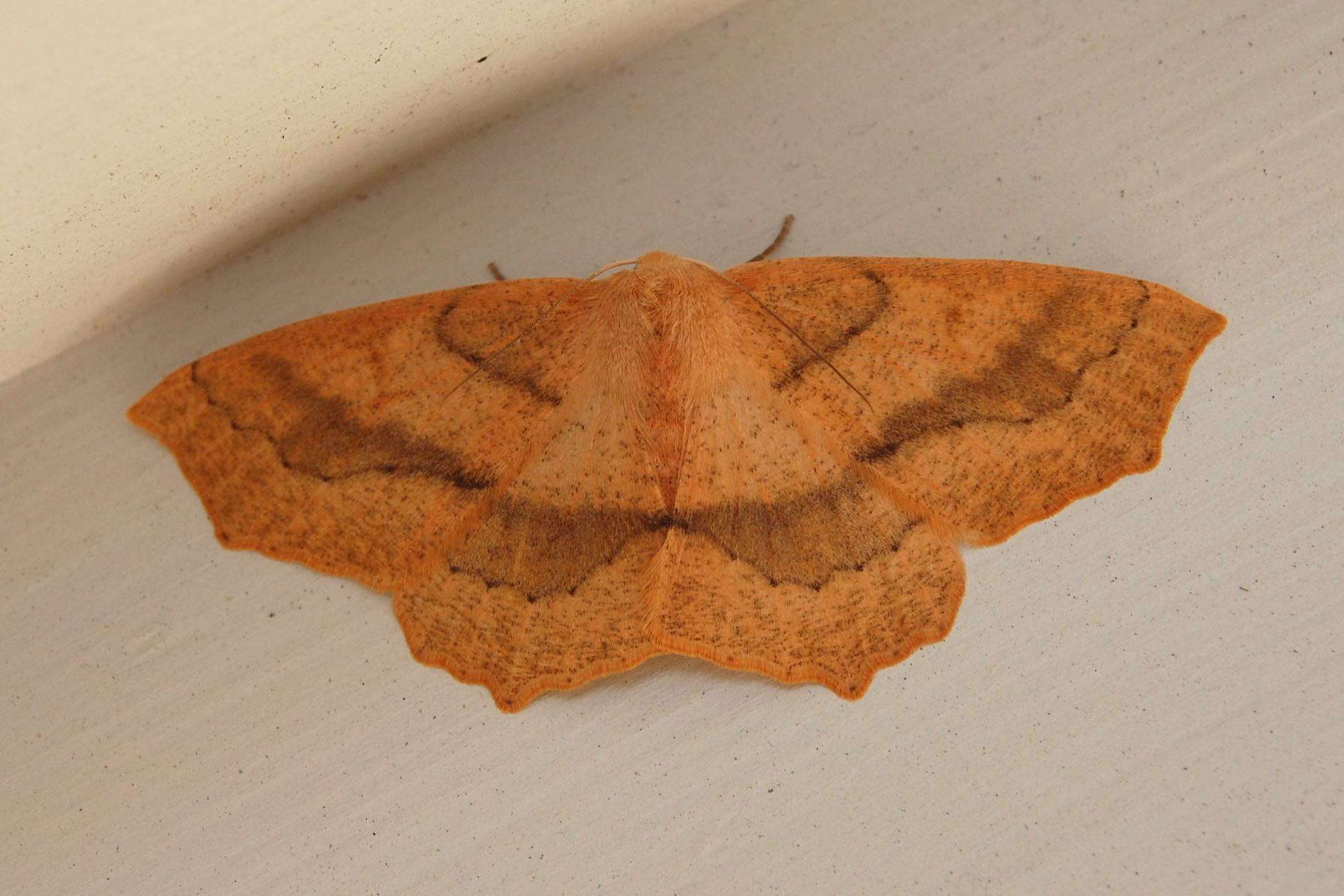
- Sabulodes aegrotata

Scientific classification
- Kingdom: Animalia
- Phylum: Arthropoda
- Clade: Pancrustacea
- Class: Insecta
- Order: Lepidoptera
- Family: Geometridae
- Tribe: Ourapterygini
- Genus: Sabulodes; Guenée, 1857

Synonyms
- Phengommataea Hulst, 1896

= Sabulodes =

Genus of moths

Sabulodes is a genus of moths in the family Geometridae first described by Achille Guenée in 1857.

== Species ==
- Sabulodes adumbrata (Warren, 1895)
- Sabulodes aegrotata (Guenée, [1858])
- Sabulodes amyntoridaria (Oberthür, 1923)
- Sabulodes argyra Druce, 1891
- Sabulodes arses Druce, 1891
- Sabulodes atropesaria (Walker, 1860)
- Sabulodes boarmidaria Oberthür, 1883
- Sabulodes boliviaria Oberthür, 1911
- Sabulodes caberata Guenée, [1858]
- Sabulodes caberata Rindge, 1978
- Sabulodes carbina (Druce, 1892)
- Sabulodes chiqua (Schaus, 1901)
- Sabulodes cleodora (Dognin, 1908)
- Sabulodes cletiusaria (Schaus, 1933)
- Sabulodes convergens (Bastelberger, 1911)
- Sabulodes curta Rindge, 1978
- Sabulodes depile Rindge, 1978
- Sabulodes dissimilis (Hulst, 1898)
- Sabulodes duoangulata (Cassino & Swett, 1923)
- Sabulodes edwardsata (Hulst, 1886)
- Sabulodes exhonorata Guenée, [1858]
- Sabulodes franciscata Dognin, 1892
- Sabulodes huachuca Rindge, 1978
- Sabulodes lachaumei Herbulot, 1988
- Sabulodes laticlavia Rindge, 1978
- Sabulodes loba Rindge, 1978
- Sabulodes mabelata (Sperry, 1948)
- Sabulodes mastaura Druce, 1891
- Sabulodes matrica Druce, 1891
- Sabulodes matrona Druce, 1891
- Sabulodes meduana Druce, 1891
- Sabulodes mima Thierry-Mieg, 1894
- Sabulodes mucronis Rindge, 1978
- Sabulodes niveostriata (Cockerell, 1893)
- Sabulodes nubifera (Warren, 1904)
- Sabulodes olifata (Guedet, 1939)
- Sabulodes ornatissima Thierry-Mieg, 1892
- Sabulodes packardata (Taylor, 1906)
- Sabulodes plauta Rindge, 1978
- Sabulodes prolata Rindge, 1978
- Sabulodes puebla Rindge, 1978
- Sabulodes pumilla Rindge, 1978
- Sabulodes sericeata Barnes & McDunnough, 1917
- Sabulodes setosa Rindge, 1978
- Sabulodes solola Rindge, 1978
- Sabulodes spoliata (Grossbeck, 1908)
- Sabulodes striata Rindge, 1978
- Sabulodes subalbata (Dognin, 1914)
- Sabulodes subcaliginosa (Dognin, 1911)
- Sabulodes subopalaria (Walker, 1860)
- Sabulodes sulphuraria (Maassen, 1890)
- Sabulodes thermidora (Thierry-Mieg, 1894)
- Sabulodes triangula Rindge, 1978
- Sabulodes versiplaga (Dognin, 1911)
- Sabulodes wygodzinskyi Rindge, 1978
- ? Sabulodes acidaliata Guenée, [1858]
- ? Sabulodes arge Druce, 1891
- ? Sabulodes arnissa Druce, 1891
- ? Sabulodes bilineata Warren, 1897
- ? Sabulodes colombiata Guenée, [1858]
- ? Sabulodes dentinata Guenée, [1858]
- ? Sabulodes exsecrata Schaus, 1911
- ? Sabulodes gorgophonaria Oberthür, 1911
- ? Sabulodes gorgyraria Oberthür, 1911
- ? Sabulodes gortyniaria Oberthür, 1911
- ? Sabulodes himerata Guenée, [1858]
- ? Sabulodes mimula Thierry-Mieg, 1894
- ? Sabulodes muscistrigata Guenée, [1858]
- ? Sabulodes nubifera Schaus, 1911
- ? Sabulodes polydora Thierry-Mieg, 1892
- ? Sabulodes pumilis Dognin, 1900
- ? Sabulodes rotundata Dognin, 1918
- ? Sabulodes tinonaria Dognin, 1896
