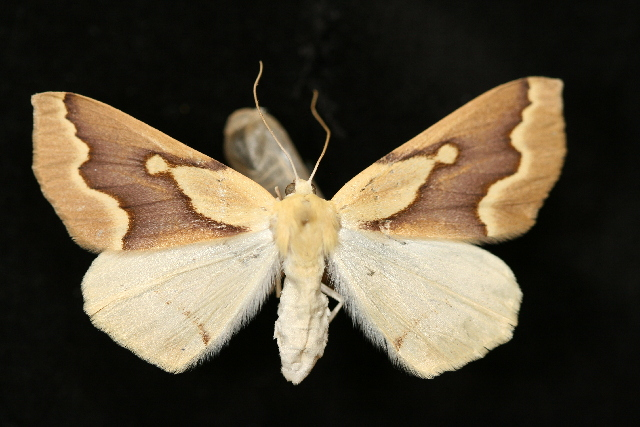

Scientific classification
- Domain: Eukaryota
- Kingdom: Animalia
- Phylum: Arthropoda
- Class: Insecta
- Order: Lepidoptera
- Family: Geometridae
- Genus: Sabulodes
- Species: S. edwardsata

Binomial name
- Sabulodes edwardsata (Hulst, 1886)

= Sabulodes edwardsata =

Species of moth

Sabulodes edwardsata is a species of geometrid moth in the family Geometridae. It is found in North America.

The MONA or Hodges number for Sabulodes edwardsata is 7004.
