= Umbellulone =

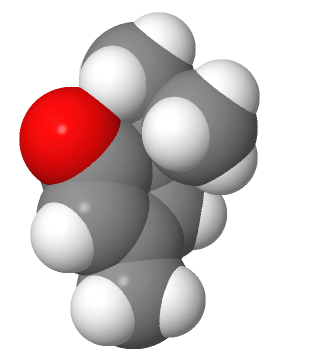

Names
- IUPAC name 4-Methyl-1-(propan-2-yl)bicyclo[3.1.0]hex-3-en-2-one
- Other names Thujenone; Thujen-2-one; Umbellulon

Identifiers
CAS Number	24545-81-1; 546-78-1 (1R,5S)
3D model (JSmol)	Interactive image
ChemSpider	82348
PubChem CID	91195
UNII	X5YT6KCX2U
CompTox Dashboard (EPA)	DTXSID40871998
- InChI: InChI=1S/C10H14O/c1-6(2)10-5-8(10)7(3)4-9(10)11/h4,6,8H,5H2,1-3H3 Key: LTTVJAQLCIHAFV-UHFFFAOYSA-N; InChI=1/C10H14O/c1-6(2)10-5-8(10)7(3)4-9(10)11/h4,6,8H,5H2,1-3H3 Key: LTTVJAQLCIHAFV-UHFFFAOYAU
- SMILES: O=C1\C=C(\C)C2C1(C(C)C)C2

Properties
Chemical formula	C_{10}H_{14}O
Molar mass	150.221 g·mol^{−1}
- Except where otherwise noted, data are given for materials in their standard state (at 25 °C [77 °F], 100 kPa). Infobox references

Umbellulone is a headache-inducing monoterpene ketone found in the leaves of the tree Umbellularia californica, sometimes known as the "headache tree".

It is hypothesized to cause headaches by influencing the trigeminovascular system via TRPA1.

== History ==
Umbellularia californica is a tree native to California and Southern Oregon.

Botanist Archibald Menzies was the first to collect the oil at the end of the 18th century. In 1826 this tree was classified as a laurel, Laurus regia, by botanist David Douglas.

In 1833 the tree received another classification by Hooker and Arnott, Tetranthera californica. Shortly after that the present name was given by Nuttal, Umbellularia californica. In 1875 Heaney obtained a colorless liquid (oreodaphenol) via fractionation under reduced pressure. This oil of the California laurel possesses a pungent odor.

Stillman (1880) did a fractionation at 215-216 °C. He discovered that inhalation of its fumes can lead to a painful cold sensation and severe headaches. In earlier times the leaves of the tree were used for cures for headaches or stomachaches and even toothaches.

Powers and Lee did in 1904 another fractionation on the oil of the tree at 217-222 °C. This yielded different compounds: pinene, cineol, eugenol, methyl eugenol and a ketone called umbellulone. Umbellulone is the chemical responsible for the headaches induced by the tree. They gave umbellulone the following structural formula:

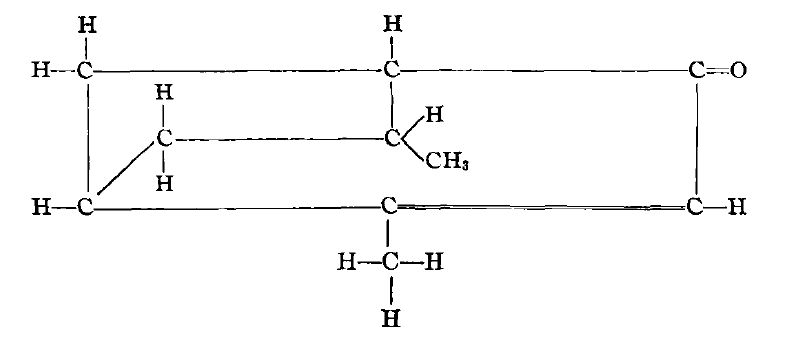
Strucutural formula according to Powers and Lee, 1904.

In 1908 the structural formula was adapted by Tutin, which was corrected later that year by Semmller to give the structural formula which is accepted today:

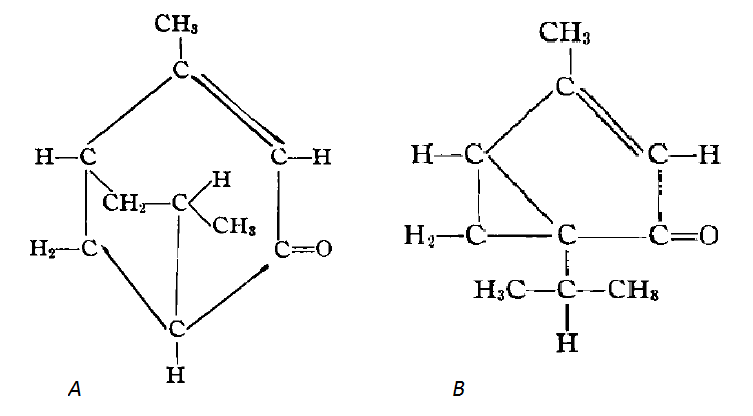
(A) Strucutural formula according to Tutin, 1908. (B) Structural formula according to Semmller, 1908.

== Structure and reactivity ==
Umbellulone is a monoterpene ketone that is found in the leaves of Umbellularia californica. The formula of umbellulone is C_{10}H_{14}O, containing a cyclopropane and cyclopentane ring. There is only one isomer of umbellulone known. Umbellulone is a lipophilic liquid (oil) at room temperature. The boiling point of umbellulone is 220 °C and the vapor pressure is 0.159 mm/Hg. Umbellulone has a high-affinity binding for thiols. The molecule is reactive with most of the thiols, such as cysteamine, but not with all.

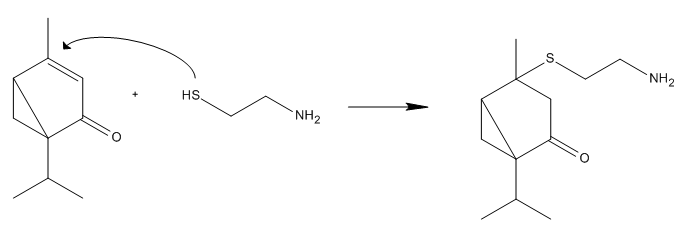
Reaction between cysteamine and umbellulone.

== Synthesis ==
A possible synthesis of umbellulone is given by the following process. Diazomethyl isopropyl ketone reacts with methyl methacrylate to give 1-carbo-methoxy-2-isobutyryl-1-methylcyclopropane. This reaction gives a yield of 35%. This is then hydrolyzed to a mixture of cis- and trans-2-isobutyryl-1-methyl-1-cyclopropane. The trans isomer is isolated and reacts with the cadmium methyl Grignard reagent to 1-acetyl-2-isobutyryl-1-methylcyclopropane. This undergoes an aldol cyclization on treatment with dilute base to umbellulone.

== Mechanism of action ==
=== TRPA1 ===
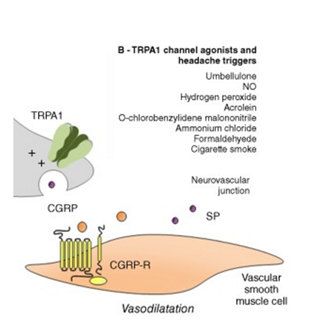
TRPA1 channel agonists can activate the TRPA1 channel to release CGRP. CGRP will bind to its receptor and will initiate vasodilation. Umbellulone is known to be able to interact with two ion channels, TRPA1 and TRPM8. Umbellulone has a high affinity to TRPA1 and a lower affinity to TRPM8.

Umbellulone can cause severe headaches by activating transient receptor potential cation channel, subfamily A, member 1 (TRPA1) and influencing the trigeminovascular system via calcitonin gene-related peptide (CGRP). Once inhaled, umbellulone will diffuse from the nasal mucosa into the blood circulation. Because of the high lipid solubility of umbellulone, the molecule will quickly pass through the epithelial cells and will quickly be absorbed in the blood. From there on, umbellulone is able to reach the perivascular sensory nerve endings of the meningeal vessels. Stimulation of these nerve fibers will eventually lead to the release of CGRP, a nociceptor known for its ability to induce migraine and cluster headache attacks.

Activation of TRPA1 by umbellulone results in the opening of this ion channel. Calcium will enter the cell and the cell membrane will be depolarized. Depolarization of the membrane will result in the release of CGRP1. Released CGRP can bind to its CGRP-receptor. This will induce a CGRP-dependent local vasodilation of the cerebral blood vessels. Vasodilation of the cerebral blood vessels will increase the blood flow to the brain's outer membranes. CGRP binding to its receptor will also promote mast cell degranulation and infiltration by neutrophils and other immune cells. The increase in immune cells and its inflammatory response is thought to be the main cause of the occurrence of migraine. It is still being discussed if vasodilation of the cerebral blood vessels contributes to the cause of the migraine and headaches. Still, the vasodilatory effect and the blood flow increase can be used as an indirect indication for the release of CGRP and therefore for the presence of the migraine and headaches.

=== TRPM8 ===
Transient receptor potential cation channel, subfamily M, member 8 (TRPM8) is an ion channel that is able to induce an intensely cold sensation when activated. Menthol is the primary ligand of TRPM8, but since umbellulone has some structural similarities with menthol, umbellulone is also able to activate TRPM8. But this is a weak interaction.

== Toxicity ==
The oil of Umbellularia californica contains 40% to 60% of umbellulone. Contact with the oil, or exposure to the vapors, can cause headache and irritation of mucus membranes.

Umbellulone can induce the conversion of hemoglobin to methemoglobin. Methemoglobin is a globin protein in the blood that mainly consists of ferric (Fe^{3+}) hemoglobin, instead of the usual ferrous (Fe^{2+}) hemoglobin. Methemoglobin has a decreased ability to bind oxygen, but, in combination with the three other ferrous ions on the hemoglobin unit, the oxygen release is also decreased. Red blood cells will be less able to nurture organs with oxygen, therefore, the probability for hypoxia increases. Methemoglobinemia is a potentially life-threatening condition when methemoglobin levels exceed 40%.

Umbellularia californica should not be mistaken for the conventional bay leaf (Laurus nobilis), which is devoid of these toxic effects.

== Other applications ==
In 2013, a new potential application of Umbellularia californica came to light. The essential oil was used for its mosquito biting deterrent and larvicidal activity. This encourages further investigation of this oil.
