= Sabulodes mabelata =

Scientific classification
- Domain: Eukaryota
- Kingdom: Animalia
- Phylum: Arthropoda
- Class: Insecta
- Order: Lepidoptera
- Family: Geometridae
- Tribe: Ourapterygini
- Genus: Sabulodes
- Species: S. mabelata

Binomial name
- Sabulodes mabelata (Sperry, 1948)

Species of moth

Sabulodes mabelata is a species of geometrid moth in the family Geometridae. It is found in North America.

The MONA or Hodges number for Sabulodes mabelata is 6999.
