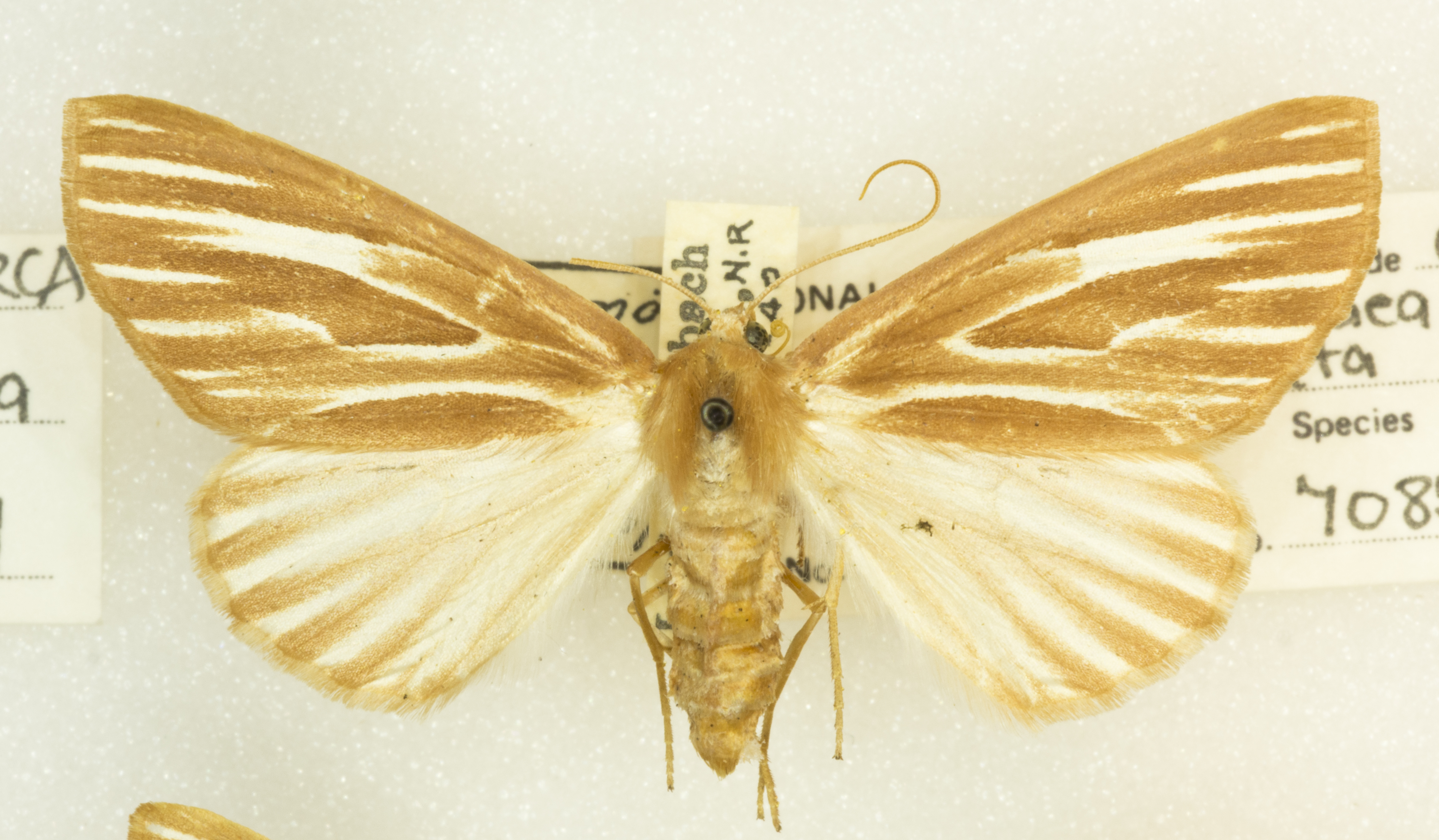

Scientific classification
- Kingdom: Animalia
- Phylum: Arthropoda
- Clade: Pancrustacea
- Class: Insecta
- Order: Lepidoptera
- Family: Geometridae
- Tribe: Ourapterygini
- Genus: Sabulodes
- Species: S. niveostriata

Binomial name
- Sabulodes niveostriata (Cockerell, 1893)

= Sabulodes niveostriata =

Species of moth

Sabulodes niveostriata is a species of geometrid moth in the family Geometridae. It is found in North America.
