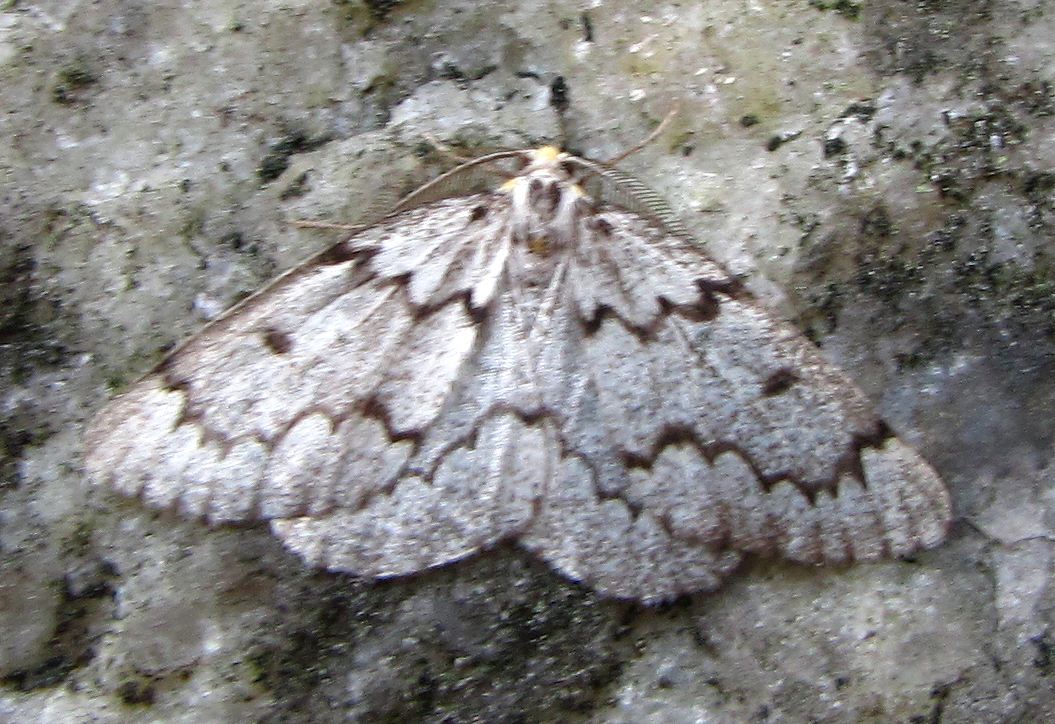

Scientific classification
- Kingdom: Animalia
- Phylum: Arthropoda
- Clade: Pancrustacea
- Class: Insecta
- Order: Lepidoptera
- Family: Geometridae
- Tribe: Ourapterygini
- Genus: Enypia
- Species: E. packardata

Binomial name
- Enypia packardata Taylor, 1906

= Enypia packardata =

Species of moth

Enypia packardata, or Packard's girdle, is a species of geometrid moth in the family Geometridae. It is found in North America.

The MONA or Hodges number for Enypia packardata is 7007.
