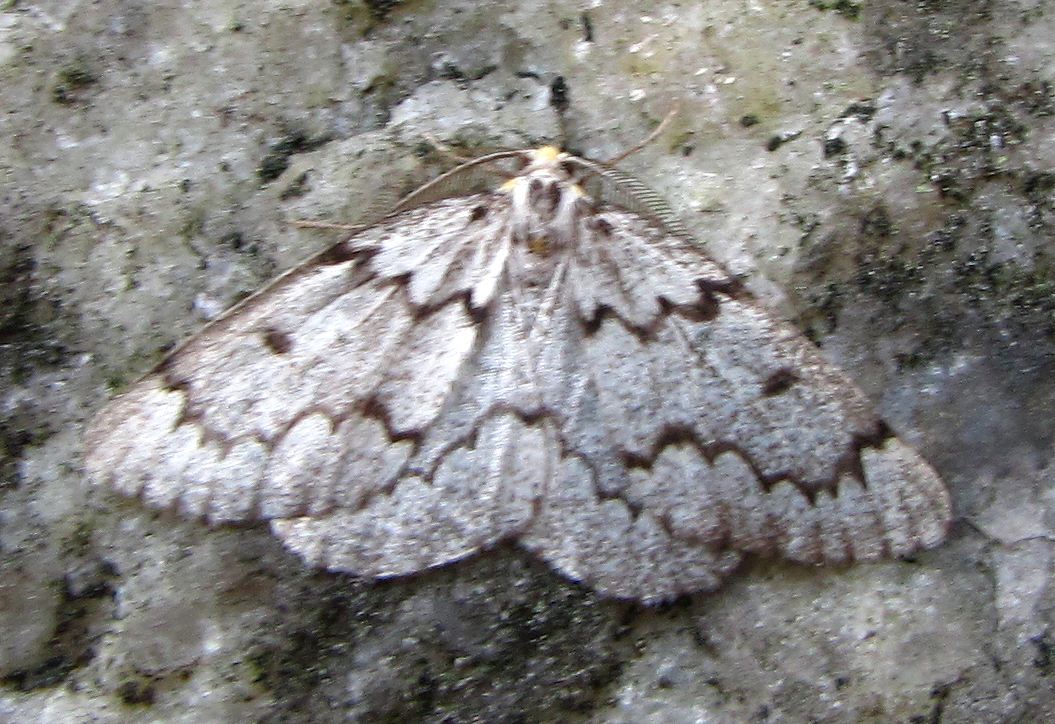
- Packard's girdle moth (Enypia packardata), Temagami, Ontario, Canada

Scientific classification
- Kingdom: Animalia
- Phylum: Arthropoda
- Clade: Pancrustacea
- Class: Insecta
- Order: Lepidoptera
- Family: Geometridae
- Tribe: Ourapterygini
- Genus: Enypia; Hulst, 1896

Species
- Four, see text

= Enypia =

Genus of moths

Enypia is a genus of moths, commonly called girdle moths, in the family Geometridae.

== Description ==
Ennypia moths have light brownish-gray wings with variably dense dark speckling and prominent, black antemedial and postmedial lines. The postmedial line is angled diagonally from the inner margin toward the apex and has a highly irregular toothed and scalloped outline, meeting the costa in the apical area. It is also irregular and fainter than on the forewing, with the outer margin being slightly angular. The antemedial line is scalloped or zigzagged hindwing and slightly paler.

== Species ==
- Enypia coolidgi Cassino & Swett, 1923
- Enypia griseata Grossbeck, 1908 – mountain girdle
- Enypia packardata Taylor, 1906 – Packard's girdle
- Enypia venata (Grote, 1883) – variable girdle
