= Sabulodes huachuca =

Scientific classification
- Domain: Eukaryota
- Kingdom: Animalia
- Phylum: Arthropoda
- Class: Insecta
- Order: Lepidoptera
- Family: Geometridae
- Tribe: Ourapterygini
- Genus: Sabulodes
- Species: S. huachuca

Binomial name
- Sabulodes huachuca Rindge, 1978

Species of moth

Sabulodes huachuca is a species of geometrid moth in the family Geometridae. It is found in North America.

The MONA or Hodges number for Sabulodes huachuca is 6998.
