= Ophiorrhabda phaeosigma =

Scientific classification
- Kingdom: Animalia
- Phylum: Arthropoda
- Class: Insecta
- Order: Lepidoptera
- Family: Tortricidae
- Genus: Ophiorrhabda
- Species: O. phaeosigma

Binomial name
- Ophiorrhabda phaeosigma (Turner, 1916)

Synonyms
- Argyroploce phaeosigma Turner, 1916

Species of moth

Ophiorrhabda phaeosigma is a species of moth of the family Tortricidae. It is found in Australia, where it has been recorded from the Northern Territory.

The wingspan is about 18 mm. The forewings are reddish purple, mixed with whitish and intermediate shades. The hindwings are ochreous brown.
