= Ophiorrhabda cellifera =

Scientific classification
- Kingdom: Animalia
- Phylum: Arthropoda
- Class: Insecta
- Order: Lepidoptera
- Family: Tortricidae
- Genus: Ophiorrhabda
- Species: O. cellifera

Binomial name
- Ophiorrhabda cellifera (Meyrick, 1912)

Synonyms
- Ophiorrhabda cellifera Meyrick, 1912; Argyroploce codonectis Meyrick, 1927; Ophiorrhabda pottsi Clarke, 1976

Species of moth

Ophiorrhabda cellifera is a moth of the family Tortricidae first described by Edward Meyrick in 1912. It is found in Sri Lanka, India, Malaya and Laos.
