= Ophiorrhabda =

Scientific classification
- Kingdom: Animalia
- Phylum: Arthropoda
- Clade: Pancrustacea
- Class: Insecta
- Order: Lepidoptera
- Family: Tortricidae
- Subfamily: Olethreutinae
- Tribe: Olethreutini
- Genus: Ophiorrhabda; Diakonoff, 1966

Genus of moths

Ophiorrhabda is a genus of moths belonging to the family Tortricidae.

== Species ==
- Ophiorrhabda cellifera (Meyrick, 1912)
- Ophiorrhabda deceptor (Diakonoff, 1966)
- Ophiorrhabda ergasima (Meyrick, 1911)
- Ophiorrhabda favillosa Diakonoff, 1973
- Ophiorrhabda harmonica (Meyrick, 1905)
- Ophiorrhabda leveri (Bradley, 1954)
- Ophiorrhabda mormopa (Meyrick, 1906)
- Ophiorrhabda mysterica (Turner, 1916)
- Ophiorrhabda phaeosigma (Turner, 1916)
- Ophiorrhabda philocompsa (Meyrick, 1921)
- Ophiorrhabda quartaria (Diakonoff, 1973)
- Ophiorrhabda scaristis (Meyrick, 1911)
- Ophiorrhabda tokui (Kawabe, 1974)
- Ophiorrhabda unicolor (Diakonoff, 1973)
