= Ophiorrhabda mysterica =

Scientific classification
- Kingdom: Animalia
- Phylum: Arthropoda
- Class: Insecta
- Order: Lepidoptera
- Family: Tortricidae
- Genus: Ophiorrhabda
- Species: O. mysterica

Binomial name
- Ophiorrhabda mysterica (Turner, 1916)

Synonyms
- Argyroploce mysterica Turner, 1916

Species of moth

Ophiorrhabda mysterica is a species of moth of the family Tortricidae. It is found in Australia, where it has been recorded from Queensland.

The wingspan is 17–18 mm. The forewings are whitish, partly purple tinged, with green and fuscous irroration (speckling) and dark green markings, partly mixed with dark fuscous. The hindwings are fuscous, with a grey basal line and purple tinged at the apex.
