= Sabulodes spoliata =

Scientific classification
- Domain: Eukaryota
- Kingdom: Animalia
- Phylum: Arthropoda
- Class: Insecta
- Order: Lepidoptera
- Family: Geometridae
- Tribe: Ourapterygini
- Genus: Sabulodes
- Species: S. spoliata

Binomial name
- Sabulodes spoliata (Grossbeck, 1908)

Species of moth

Sabulodes spoliata is a species of geometrid moth in the family Geometridae. It is found in North America.

The MONA or Hodges number for Sabulodes spoliata is 7003.

== Subspecies ==
These three subspecies belong to the species Sabulodes spoliata:

- Sabulodes spoliata berkleyata Wright, 1917
- Sabulodes spoliata lagunata Cassino & Swett, 1923
- Sabulodes spoliata spoliata
