= Trigeminovascular system =

The trigeminovascular system (TVS) refers to neurons and their axonal projections within the trigeminal nerve that project to the cranial meninges and meningeal blood vessels residing on the brain's surface. The term, introduced in 1983 denotes also the neuropeptides contained within axons that are released into the meninges to target vessels and surrounding cells (e.g., mast cells, macrophages, Schwann cells).

The major drugs used to treat migraine in the 19th and 20th century (ergot alkaloids, triptans) were found by Moskowitz and colleagues to inhibit neuropeptide release from trigeminovascular axons as their major mechanism of action. Because drugs that block the release of neuropeptides from trigeminovascular fibres are therapeutically relevant for relieving migraine headaches (especially CGRP to date), hence, it has been hypothesized that the trigeminovascular system may be involved in migraine headaches. Studies of the TVS have helped to identify therapeutic targets for migraine including onabotulinum toxin, 5-HT1F receptor agonist (lasmiditan),5-HT1B,D as well as CGRP and its receptor system including both small molecule drugs and biologicals. Numerous experimental studies have established that cortical spreading depolarization, the biological substrate for migraine aura, can discharge trigeminovascular afferents as a cause of head pain and by extension unilateral headache overlying the dysfunctional hemisphere in migraineurs with aura. Hence, the TVS has provided a template for migraine pathophysiology and target for drug discovery.

The history of some discoveries regarding the TV System are summarised in Ashina, et al.

The Brain Prize for 2021 was awarded to 4 investigators studying the trigeminovascular system and its implications for migraine pathophysiology and treatments.

== See also ==
- Umbellulone
