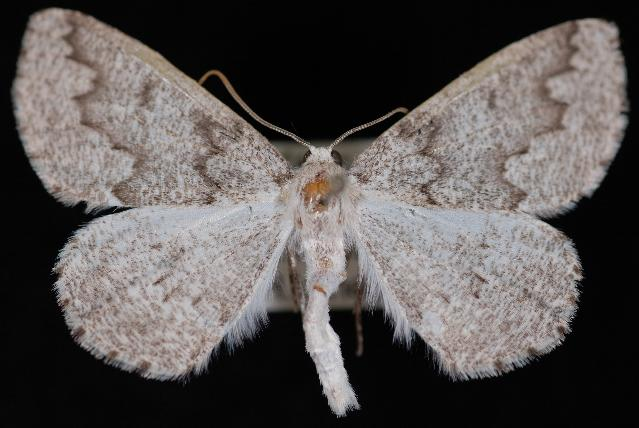

Scientific classification
- Domain: Eukaryota
- Kingdom: Animalia
- Phylum: Arthropoda
- Class: Insecta
- Order: Lepidoptera
- Family: Geometridae
- Genus: Enypia
- Species: E. griseata

Binomial name
- Enypia griseata Grossbeck, 1908

Synonyms
- Enypia moillieti Blackmore, 1926

= Enypia griseata =

Species of moth

Enypia griseata, the mountain girdle, is a species of geometrid moth in the family Geometridae. It is found in North America.

The MONA or Hodges number for Enypia griseata is 7006.
