= Umbellularia =

- Mature specimen in Oakland, CA

Conservation status
- Least Concern (IUCN 3.1)

Scientific classification
- Kingdom: Plantae
- Clade: Tracheophytes
- Clade: Angiosperms
- Clade: Magnoliids
- Order: Laurales
- Family: Lauraceae
- Genus: Umbellularia; Nutt.
- Species: U. californica

Binomial name
- Umbellularia californica (Hook. & Arn.) Nutt.
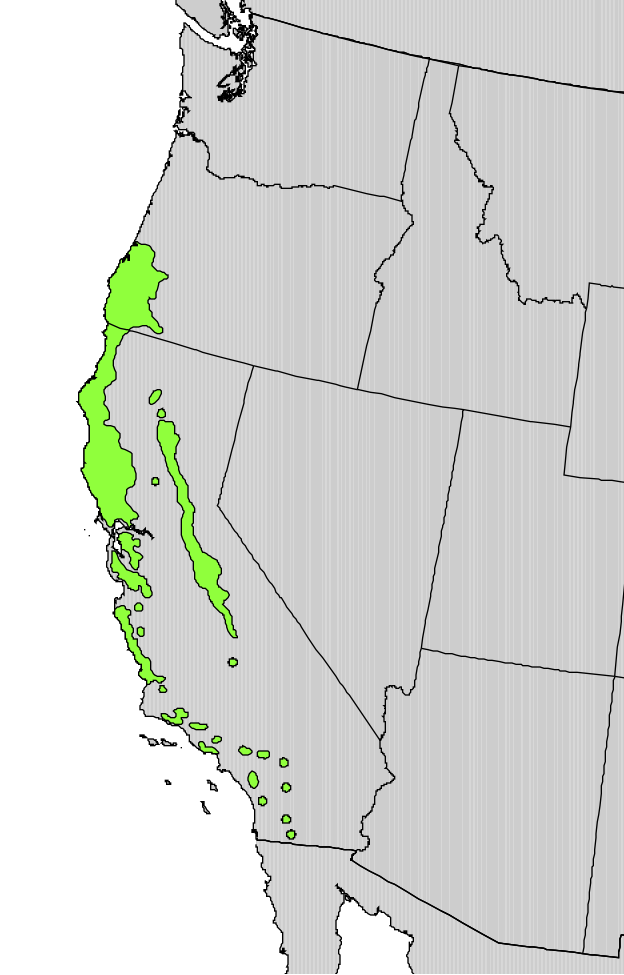
- Natural range

Synonyms
- Drimophyllum Nutt.; Drimophyllum pauciflorum Nutt.; Litsea californica (Hook. & Arn.) Benth. & Hook.f. ex B.D.Jacks.; Oreodaphne californica Nees; Oreodaphne regalis Regel; Persea causticans Pasq.; Tetranthera californica Hook. & Arn.; Tetranthera causticans (Pasq.) Pasq.; Umbellularia californica var. fresnensis Eastw.; Umbellularia californica f. pendula Rehder

Genus of trees

Umbellularia californica is a large hardwood tree native to coastal forests and the Sierra foothills of California, and extending into the coastal forests southwestern Oregon and the mountains of northwestern Baja California. It is the sole species in the genus Umbellularia, in the laurel family Lauraceae. The tree's pungent leaves have a similar flavor to bay leaves, though stronger, and it may be mistaken for bay laurel.

In Yuki, it is called pōl'-cum ōl. In Oregon, this tree is known as Oregon myrtle, while in California it is called California bay laurel, which may be shortened to California bay or California laurel. It has also been called pepperwood, spicebush, cinnamon bush, peppernut tree, headache tree, mountain laurel, and balm of heaven.

The tree is endemic to the California Floristic Province. It is a host of the pathogen that causes sudden oak death. The dry wood has a color range from blonde (like maple) to brown (like walnut). It is considered an excellent tonewood and is sought after by luthiers and woodworkers.

The species was first described as Tetranthera californica by William Jackson Hooker and George Arnott Walker Arnott in 1833. In 1842 Thomas Nuttall placed the species in the newly-described genus Umbellularia as U. californica.

== Description ==
It is an evergreen tree or shrub growing to up to 30 metres (98 feet) tall with a trunk up to 90 centimetres (35 inches) in diameter. The largest recorded tree is in Mendocino County, California, and measured (as of 1997) 33 m (108 ft) in height with a 36 m (119 ft) spread. The thin bark is smooth and gray-brown when young, later turning reddish brown and scaly.

The fragrant leaves are smooth-edged and lance-shaped, 3–15 cm (1 1/4–6 in) long and around a third as wide, similar to the related bay laurel, though usually narrower, and without the crinkled margin of that species. The leaves are green, and lighter on the underside. The bark and leaves have a pungent scent resembling camphor when bruised, due to a chemical known as umbellulone.

The flowers are small, yellow or yellowish-green, produced in small umbels (hence the scientific name Umbellularia, "little umbel"). Unlike other "bay laurels" of the genus Laurus, Umbellularia has perfect flowers (male and female parts in the same flower).

The fruit, also known as "California bay nut", is a round and green drupe 2–2.5 cm long and 2 cm broad, lightly spotted with yellow, maturing purple. Under the thin, leathery skin, it consists of an oily, fleshy covering over a single hard, thin-shelled pit, and resembles a miniature avocado. (Umbellularia is related to the avocado's genus Persea, within the family Lauraceae.) The fruit ripens around October–November in the native range.

The oldest-known living laurel is the Jepson Laurel, named after Willis Linn Jepson, in San Mateo County. The tree lives on San Francisco Water Department land, the agency caring for the tree.

There is another 300+ year old Laurel in Bay Tree Park in San Mateo. The park is named for the tree.

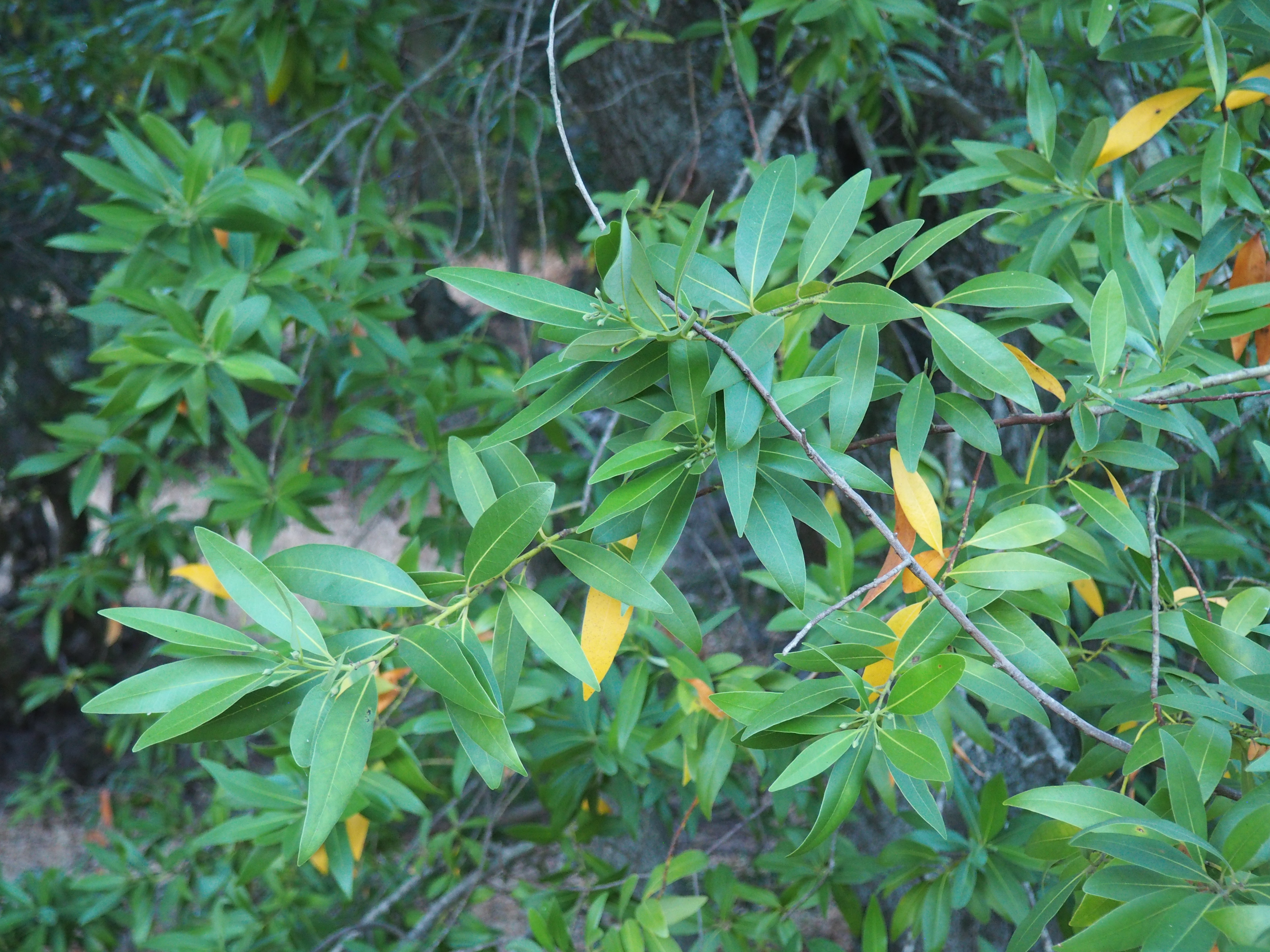
Leaves

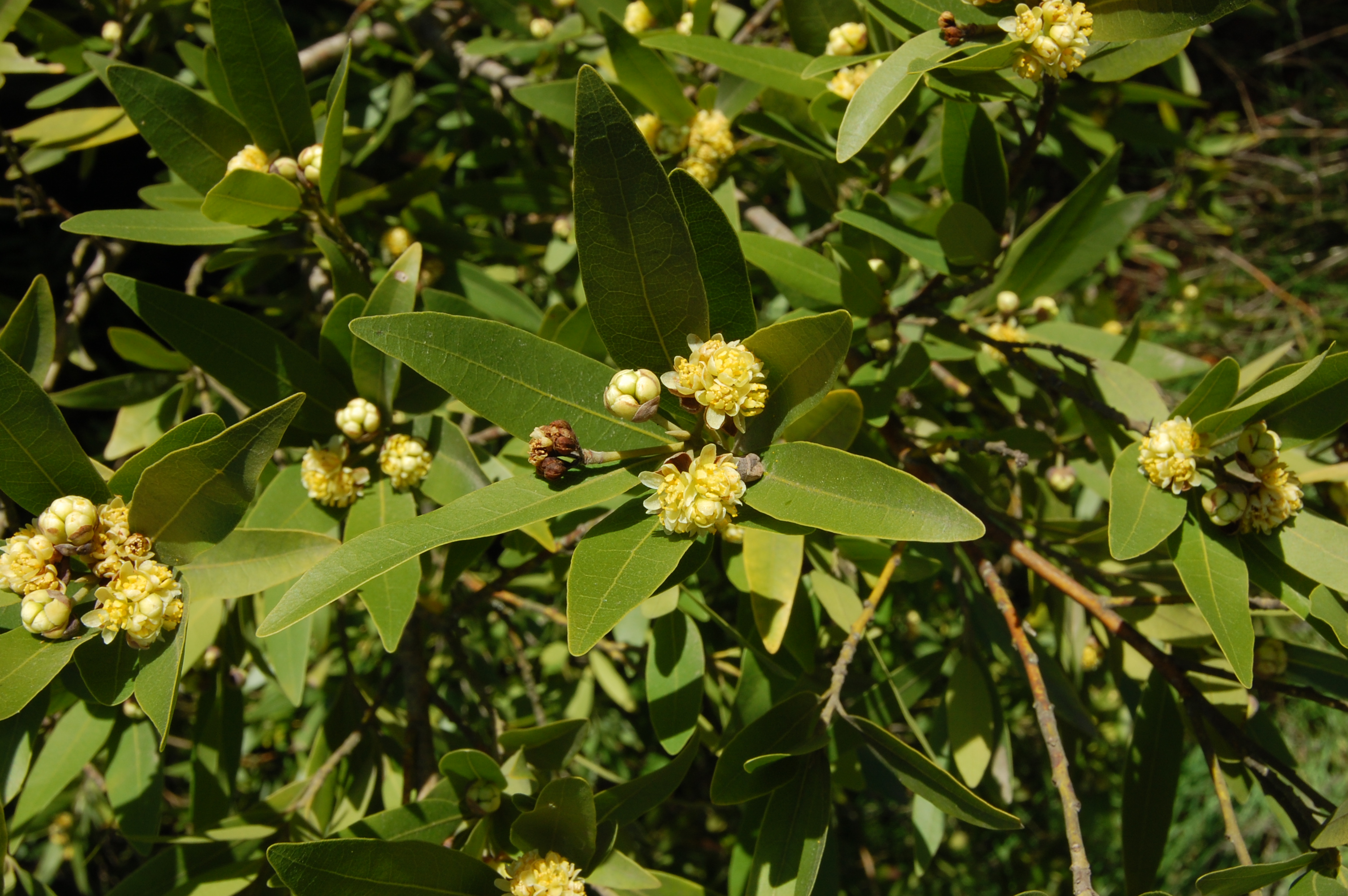
Flowers

Developing fruit

Dense foliage and broad crown of mature specimen in the Berkeley Hills.

== Distribution and habitat ==
Umbellularia is found in southwest Oregon and in California south to San Diego County. It is also found in the western foothills of the Sierra Nevada mountains. It occurs from sea level up to 1,600 m (5,200 ft) elevation. It is an introduced species in British Columbia, Washington, and northern Oregon.

It mostly inhabits redwood forests, California mixed woods, yellow pine forest, and oak woodlands. Bays occur in oak woodland close to the coast, and in northern California where moisture is sufficient, usually in or near riparian areas. The species is very shade tolerant. It is reduced to a shrub in extreme dry and hot habitats.

During the Miocene, oak-laurel forests were found in Central and Southern California. Typical tree species included oaks ancestral to present-day California oaks, and an assemblage of trees from the laurel family, including Nectandra, Ocotea, Persea, and Umbellularia. Only one native species from the laurel family, Umbellularia californica, remains in California today.

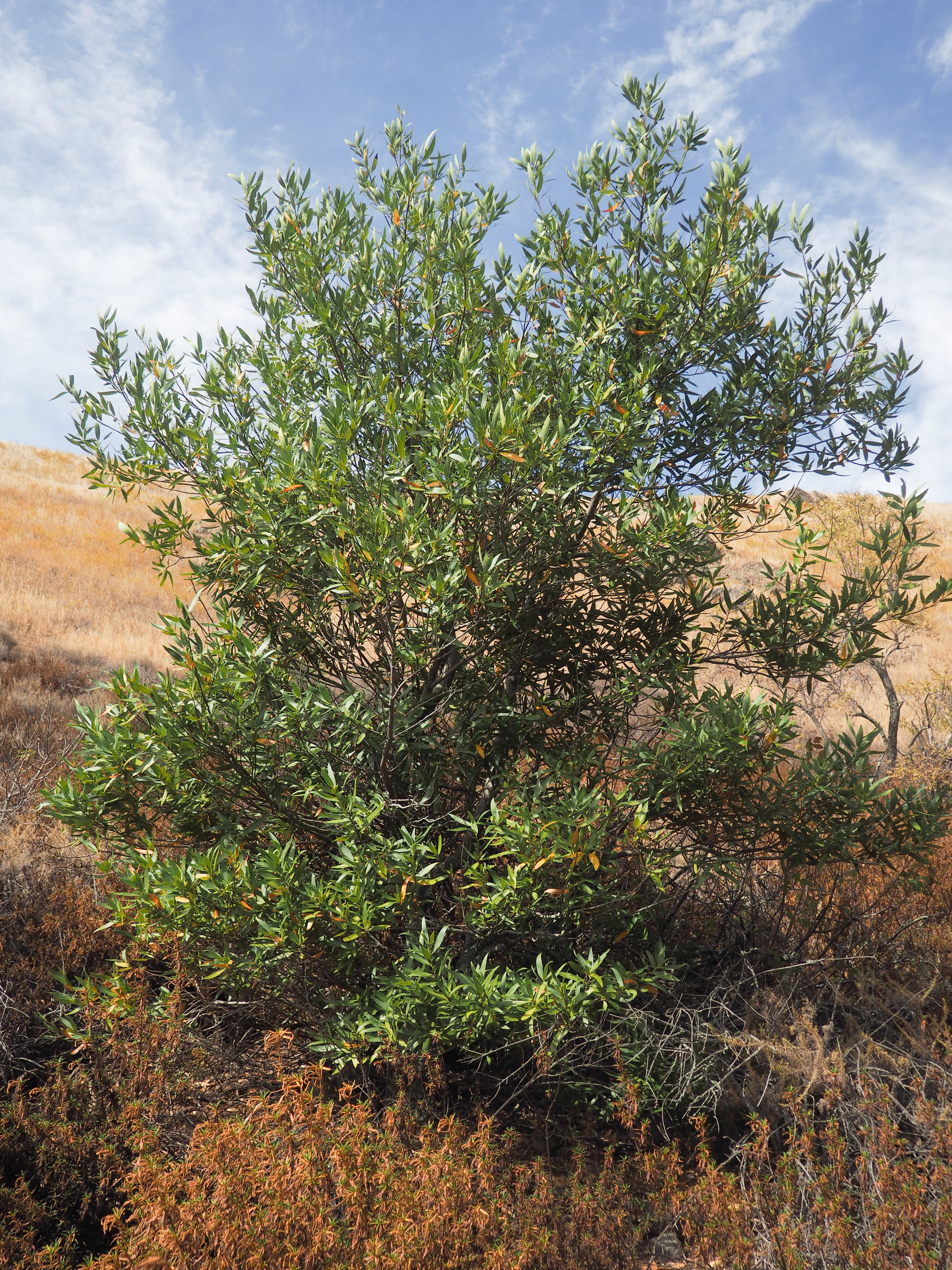
Shrubby, open form occurs on dry sites

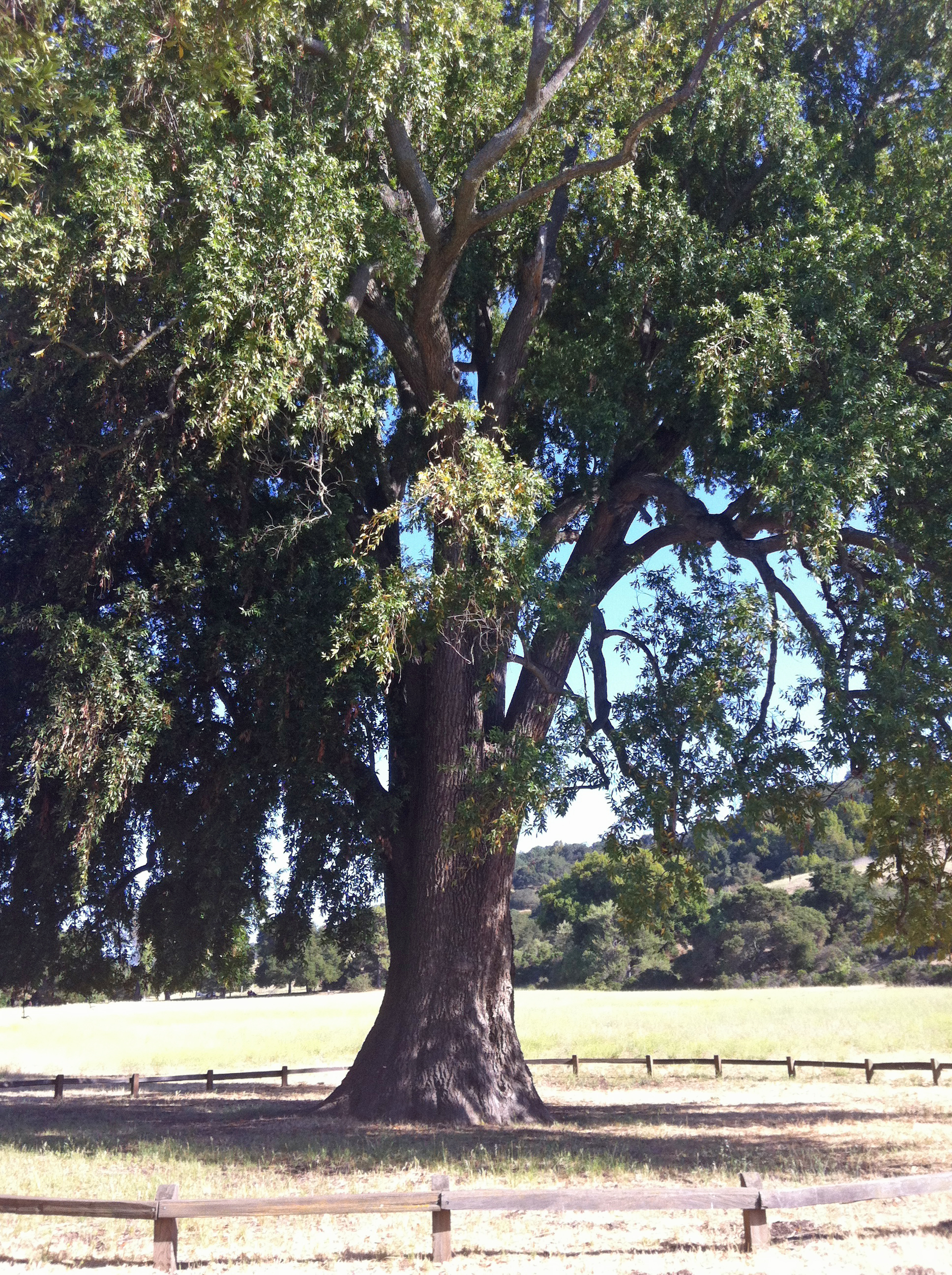
Large tree on Permanente Creek

== Ecology ==
U. californica can reproduce vegetatively and can sprout prolifically from root collar stump and trunk. Sprouts and sucker will form wherever there is enough light such as recent openings in the forest canopy. It is common for stumps to be ringed with new growth and for standing and fallen trunks to produce suckers. The bark of this species is thin and does not protect against fire. Fire kills the seedlings, saplings and even mature trees. However, top-killed U. californica (where the base and roots have remained alive), can resprout rapidly after a fire, with one study observing new sprouts 4-6 weeks after winter and spring fires. Flowers have even been noted on first year sprouts, showing this species adaptations to this phenomenon. Deer browse the fresh sprouts.

The species is a host of Phytophthora ramorum, the pathogen that causes the disease sudden oak death. It is important in this sense because it is one of two tree species (tanoak being the other) on which the pathogen readily produces spores.

U. californica sprouting prolifically after being cut

Adventitious shoots on a prostrate trunk

Older specimen showing multi-trunked growth habit

== Uses ==
=== Historical usage ===
Umbellularia has long been valued for its many uses by Native Americans throughout the tree's range, including the Cahuilla, Chumash, Ohlone, Pomo, Miwok, Yuki, Coos, and Salinan people. The Concow tribe call the plant sō-ē'-bä (Konkow language).

Poultices of Umbellularia leaves were used to treat rheumatism and neuralgias. A tea was made from the leaves to treat stomach aches, colds, sore throats, and to clear up mucus in the lungs. The leaves were steeped in hot water to make an infusion that was used to wash sores. The Pomo and Yuki tribes of Mendocino County treated headaches by placing a single leaf in the nostril or bathing the head with a laurel leaf infusion.

Both the flesh and the inner kernel of the fruit have been used as food by Native Americans. The fatty outer flesh of the fruit, or mesocarp, is palatable raw for only a brief time when ripe; prior to this the volatile aromatic oils are too strong, and afterwards the flesh quickly becomes bruised, like that of an overripe avocado. Native Americans dried the fruits in the sun and ate only the lower third of the dried mesocarp, which is less pungent.

The hard inner seed underneath the fleshy mesocarp, like the pit of an avocado, cleaves readily in two when its thin shell is cracked. The pit itself was traditionally roasted to a dark chocolate-brown color, removing much of the pungency and leaving a spicy flavor. Roasted, shelled "bay nuts" were eaten whole, or ground into powder and prepared as a drink which resembles unsweetened chocolate. The flavor, depending on roast level, has been described variously as "roast coffee," "dark chocolate" or "burnt popcorn". The powder might also be used in cooking or pressed into cakes and dried for winter storage. It has been speculated that the nuts contain a stimulant; however this possible effect has been little documented by biologists.

=== Modern usage ===
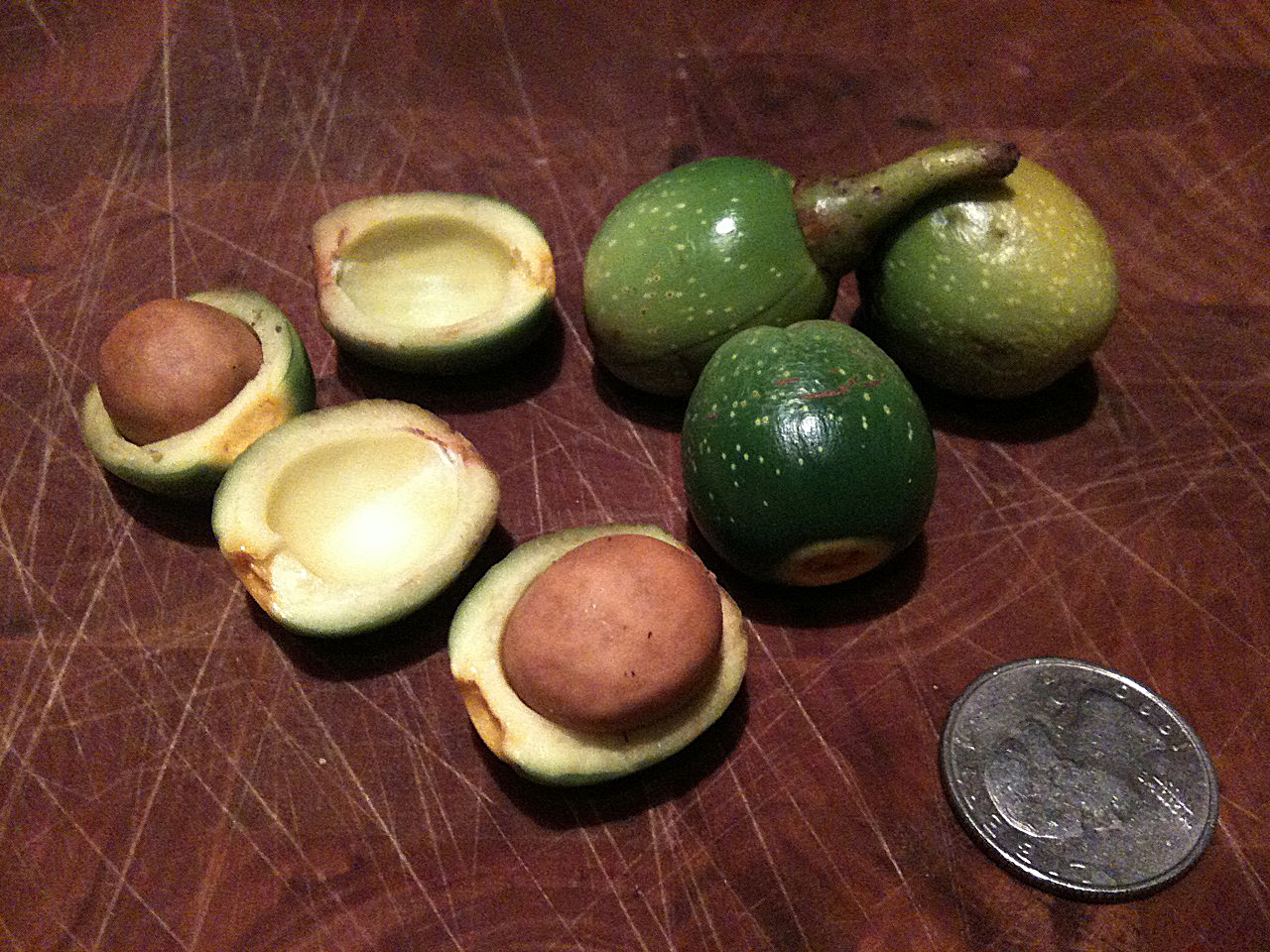
Nearly ripe nuts being prepared for roasting

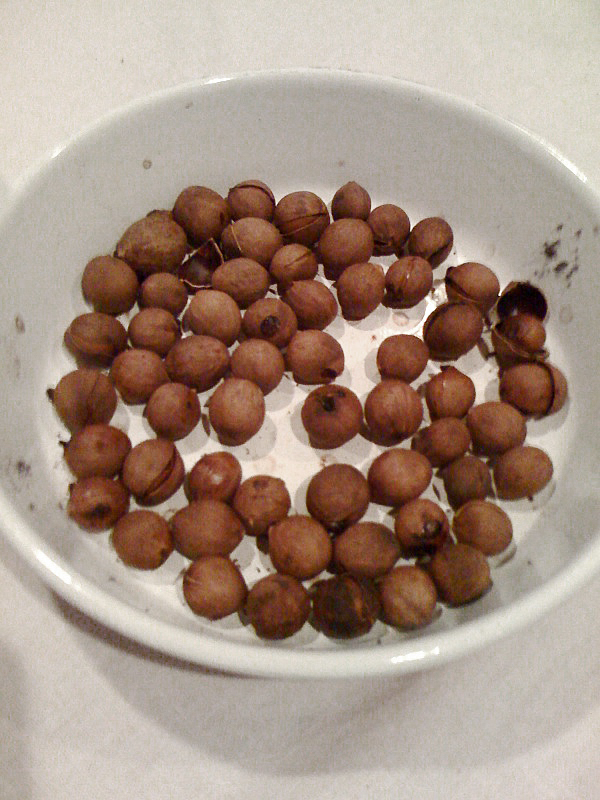
Roasted nuts

The leaf has been used in cooking but contains large amounts of the toxic compound umbellulone, which causes methemoglobinemia. Umbellulone is absent from culinary bay leaves (Laurus nobilis). Umbellularia leaf imparts a somewhat stronger camphor/cinnamon flavor compared to the Mediterranean bay.

Some modern-day foragers and wild food enthusiasts have adopted Native American practices regarding the fruit, the bay nut, edible when roasted.

Umbellularia californica is also used in woodworking. It is considered a tonewood, used to construct the backs and sides of acoustic guitars. The wood is very hard and fine, and is also made into bowls, spoons, and other small items and sold as "myrtlewood". It is also grown as an ornamental tree, both in its native area, and further north up the Pacific coast to Vancouver in Canada, and in western Europe. It can be planted as a hedge or windbreak. It is occasionally used for firewood.

According to a modern Miwok recipe for acorn soup, "it is essential that you add a generous amount of California laurel" when storing acorns to dry, to keep insects away from the acorns.

One popular use for the leaves is to put them between the bed mattresses to get rid of, or prevent, flea infestations.

The wood is used as lumber in furniture making, especially highly figured specimens.

==== "Myrtlewood" money ====
"Myrtlewood" is the only wood still in use as a base "metal" for legal tender. During the 1933 "interregnum of despair" between Franklin Roosevelt's election and his inauguration, the only bank in the town of North Bend, Oregon—the First National—was forced to temporarily close its doors, precipitating a cash-flow crisis for the City of North Bend. The city solved this problem by minting its own currency, using myrtlewood discs printed on a newspaper press. These coins, in denominations from 25 cents to $10, were used to pay employees, with the city promising to redeem them for cash as soon as it became available.

However, when the bank reopened and the city appealed for people to bring their myrtlewood money in to redeem it, many opted to keep their tokens as collector's items. After several appeals, the city announced that the tokens would remain legal tender in the city of North Bend in perpetuity. The unredeemed tokens have become very valuable, because of scarcity and historical interest. Fewer than 10 full sets are believed to exist.
