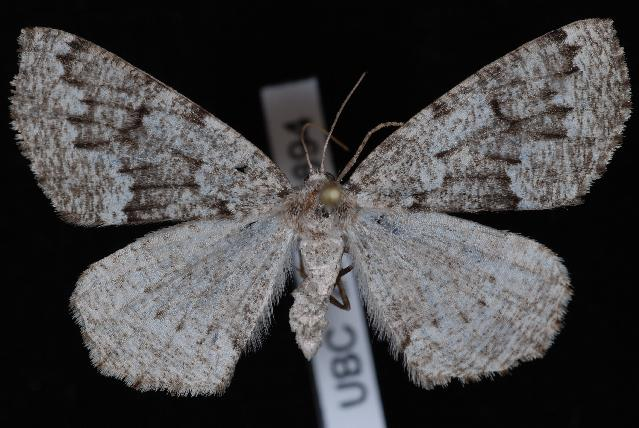

Scientific classification
- Kingdom: Animalia
- Phylum: Arthropoda
- Class: Insecta
- Order: Lepidoptera
- Family: Geometridae
- Genus: Enypia
- Species: E. venata

Binomial name
- Enypia venata (Grote, 1883)

Synonyms
- Cleora venata Grote, 1883; Enypia perangulata Hulst, 1896; Enypia venata eddyi Barnes & Benjamin, 1929

= Enypia venata =

Species of moth

Enypia venata, the variable girdle, is a species of geometrid moth in the family Geometridae. It was first described by Augustus Radcliffe Grote in 1883 and it is found in North America.

The MONA or Hodges number for Enypia venata is 7005.
