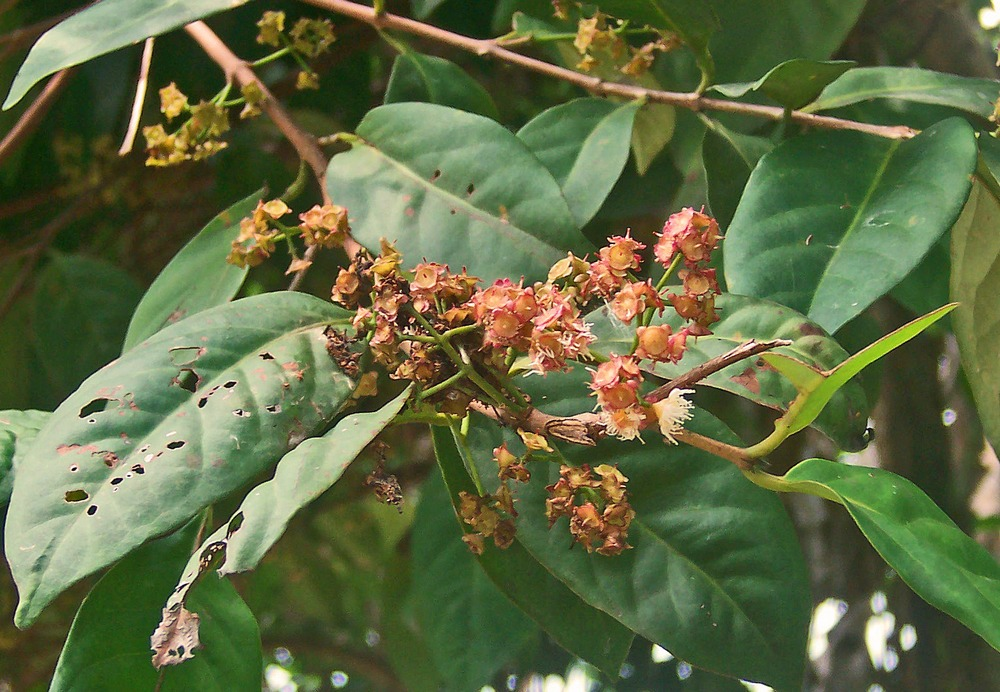

Scientific classification
- Kingdom: Plantae
- Clade: Tracheophytes
- Clade: Angiosperms
- Clade: Eudicots
- Clade: Rosids
- Order: Myrtales
- Family: Myrtaceae
- Genus: Syzygium
- Species: S. polyanthum

Binomial name
- Syzygium polyanthum (Wight) Walp.

Synonyms
- Eugenia atropunctata C.B.Rob. nom. illeg.; Eugenia holmanii Elmer; Eugenia junghuhniana Miq.; Eugenia lambii Elmer; Eugenia lucidula Miq.; Eugenia microbotrya Miq.; Eugenia nitida Duthie nom. illeg.; Eugenia pamatensis Miq.; Eugenia polyantha Wight; Eugenia resinosa Gagnep.; Myrtus cymosa Blume nom. illeg.; Syzygium cymosum Korth. nom. illeg.; Syzygium micranthum Blume ex Miq.; Syzygium microbotryum (Miq.) Masam.; Syzygium pamatense (Miq.) Masam.

= Syzygium polyanthum =

Species of flowering plant

Syzygium polyanthum, with common names Indonesian bay leaf or daun salam, is a species of plant in the family Myrtaceae, native to Indonesia, Indochina and Malaysia. The leaves of the plant are traditionally used as a food flavouring, and have been shown to kill the spores of Bacillus cereus.

== Description ==
The tree grows from lower to higher elevation up to 1400 meters. The tree can grow up to 25 meters of height. The leaf gives slightly bitter taste with astringent effect.

== Uses ==
The leaves may be used dried or fresh in the cuisine of Sumatra, Java, Madura, or Bali. It is an ingredient in dishes such as sayur lodeh and nasi gurih. In Suriname it is known as 'salam blad' and widely used in Javanese cuisine, mainly in dishes such as soto soup and various stews.

Because of its unique flavor it is not possible to find suitable substitutes for it.
