= Las Trampas Ridge =

Ridge in western Contra Costa County, California

- (Spanish) Sierra de Las Trampas
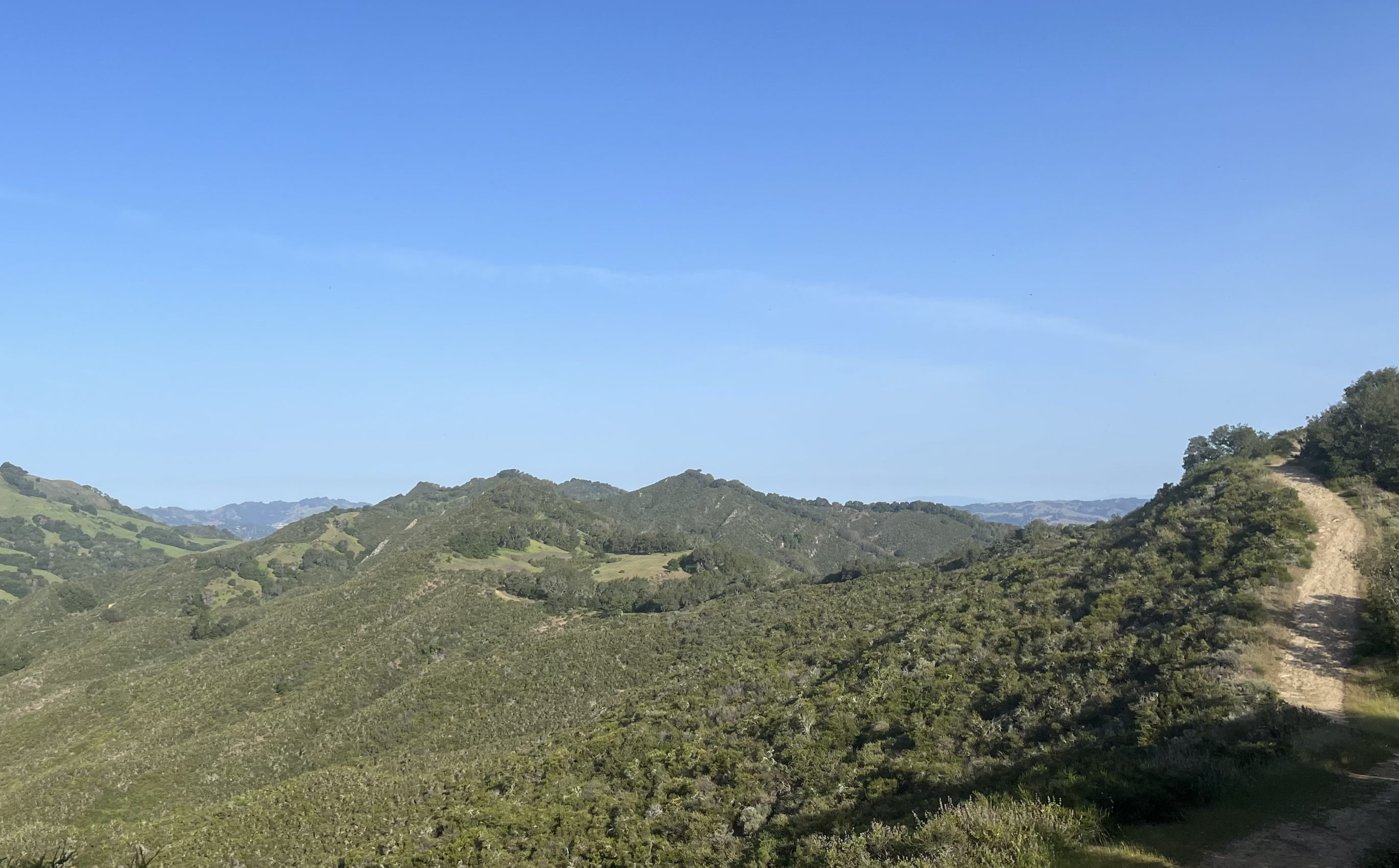
- A view from atop Las Trampas Ridge looking north (April 7th, 2022)

Highest point
- Elevation: 1,827 ft (557 m)
- Parent peak: Las Trampas Peak
- Coordinates: 37°49′04″N 122°02′05″W

Naming
- Etymology: Spanish

Geography
- Location within California
- Location: Contra Costa County, California, United States
- Parent range: Inner Coast Ranges

Geology
- Rock type: Great Valley Sequence

Las Trampas Ridge is an 1,827 ft (557 m) ridge in western Contra Costa County, California, in the San Francisco Bay Area. It comprises the western side of the San Ramon Valley.

== Etymology ==
Las Trampas is Spanish for the traps or the snares. This name was given to the area by Spanish and later Mexican settlers who observed the indigenous Saclan peoples' method of trapping herds of Tule elk and deer using the steep canyons on the ridge.

== Geography ==
Las Trampas Ridge is a prominent feature in the geography of the East Bay region. It provides a backdrop for the towns of San Ramon, Alamo and Danville, California. The ridge is paralleled by Interstate 680 between Walnut Creek and San Ramon.

It ascends north-northwest for approximately 8 miles from San Ramon, California to its terminus at Las Trampas Peak just south of the city of Lafayette, California, where it tapers off into a series of steep forested foothills. Las Trampas Ridge is a largely rural landform that is surrounded by a rapidly encroaching network of suburbs.

The Las Trampas area is among the highest and most rugged in the East Bay, second only to Mount Diablo across the San Ramon Valley.

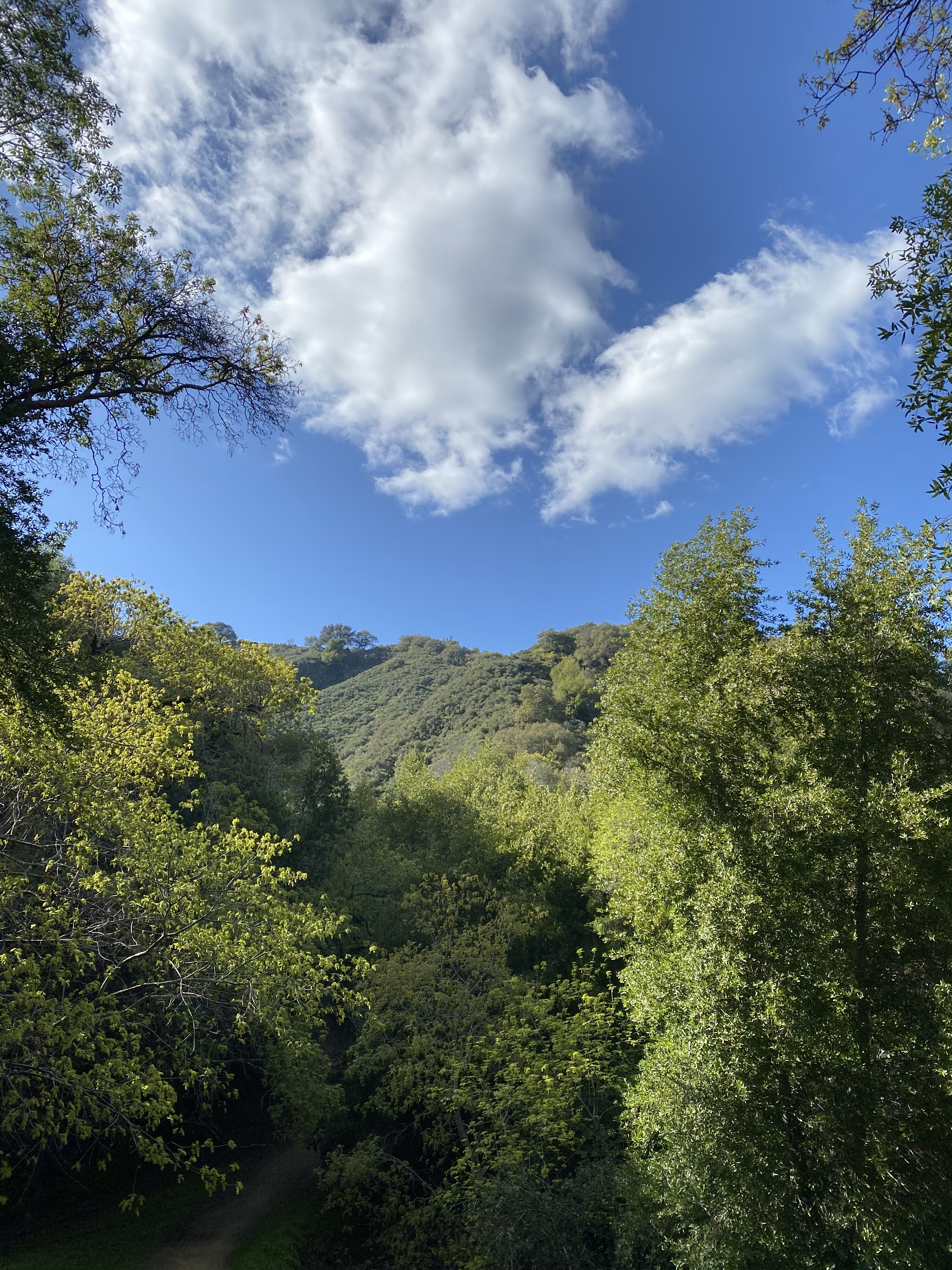
The intense geologic setting of Las Trampas Ridge influences the formation of steep canyons such as this one. Forests of California Bay and various oak trees give way to chaparral on higher and more exposed slopes (March 22nd, 2021)

Las Trampas Ridge comprises the western side of the San Ramon Valley along with Mount Diablo and parallels the route of Interstate 680 through the area. The cities of Concord, Walnut Creek, Alamo, San Ramon and much of the Livermore Valley are visible from the ridge. Las Trampas Ridge serves as the backdrop to many of the communities in the central East Bay.

The region has a cool-summer mediterranean climate, with areas on the western side of the ridge staying generally cooler than those on the eastern side during the summer months. Winters are generally cool and wet, while summers can be warm or hot, with very little, if any, precipitation. Las Trampas ridge creates a rain shadow leading to lower rainfall and higher average temperatures in the San Ramon Valley than areas further west.

Much of Las Trampas Ridge is preserved within the Las Trampas Regional Wilderness, a 5,778 acre nature preserve which includes much of the ridge and the upper reaches of Bollinger Creek. Multiple trails maintained by the East Bay Regional Park District ascend the ridge through a variety of habitat types from the surrounding suburbs. A number of ranches also cover the ridge to the south of the regional park. Suburban and retail development has occurred on Las Trampas Ridge's eastern and southern fringes, mainly along the Interstate 680 corridor.

== Geology ==
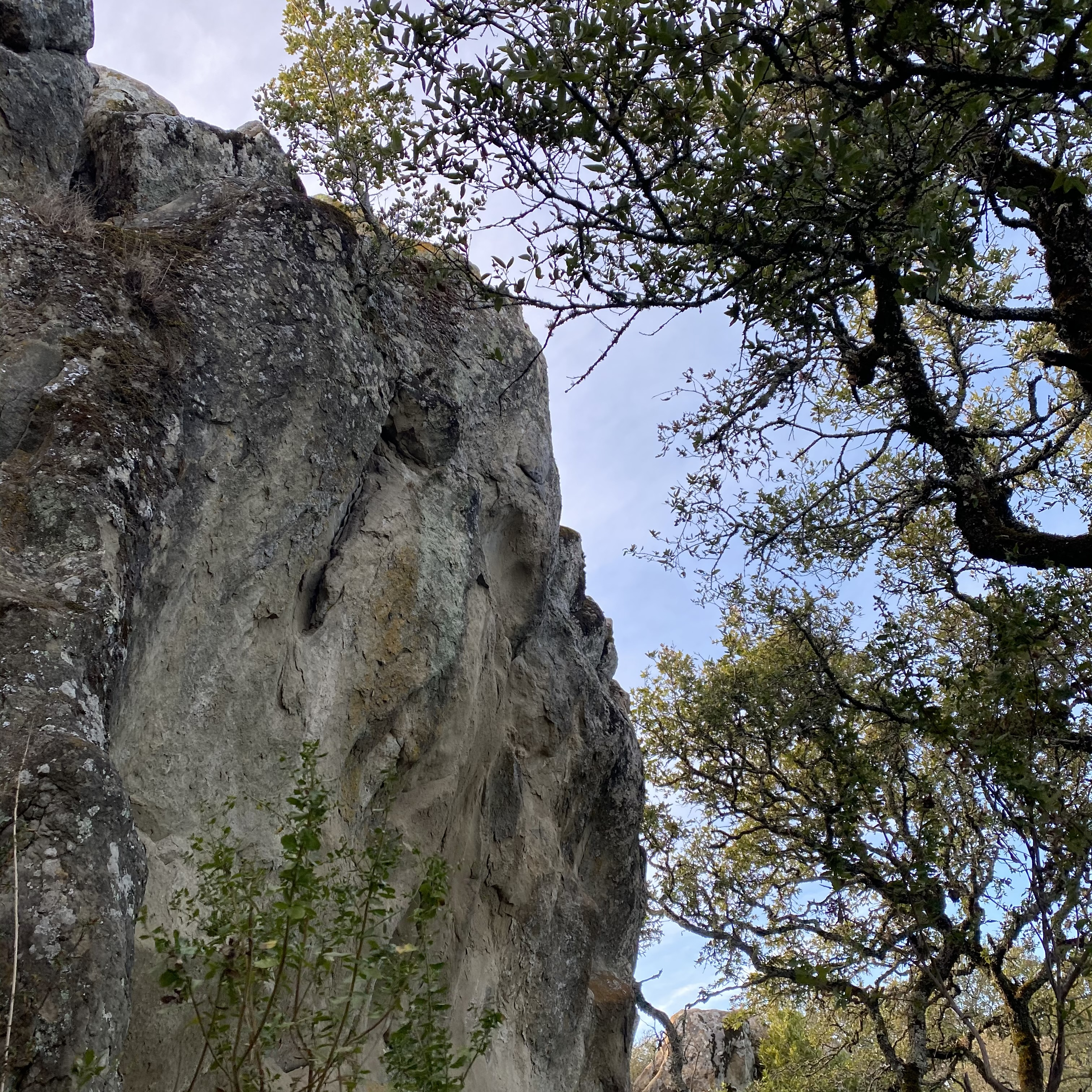
An outcrop of Miocene sandstone at Eagle Peak along Las Trampas Ridge (December 23rd, 2020)

Like much of the inner East Bay, Las Trampas Ridge is composed of marine sedimentary rocks, namely those of the upper Miocene. In past millennia, the area now occupied by Las Trampas Ridge was the floor of a shallow coastal sea with abundant marine life. This is evidenced by fossilized mollusks and other sea life preserved in outcrops of the Briones sandstone along much of the high elevation portion of the ridge.

In addition to the fossiliferous formations, multiple other rock formations are found on the ridge including mudstones, alluvial and lacustrine conglomerates, limestone and tuff, among others. The high level of geologic activity in the region accounts for the number and diversity of rock types found on the ridge.

In more recent times, the area has undergone multiple cycles of uplift, faulting and erosion. Las Trampas Ridge is part of a complex system of faulting and folding related to the Calaveras Fault, which is a part of the larger San Andreas Fault. Multiple minor transform faults intersect and traverse Las Trampas Ridge and often manifest as outcrops along the crest of the ridge; the region as a whole is very seismically active. It is being uplifted as a result of thrust faulting and transform faulting, forming the steep terrain now present.

== Ecology ==
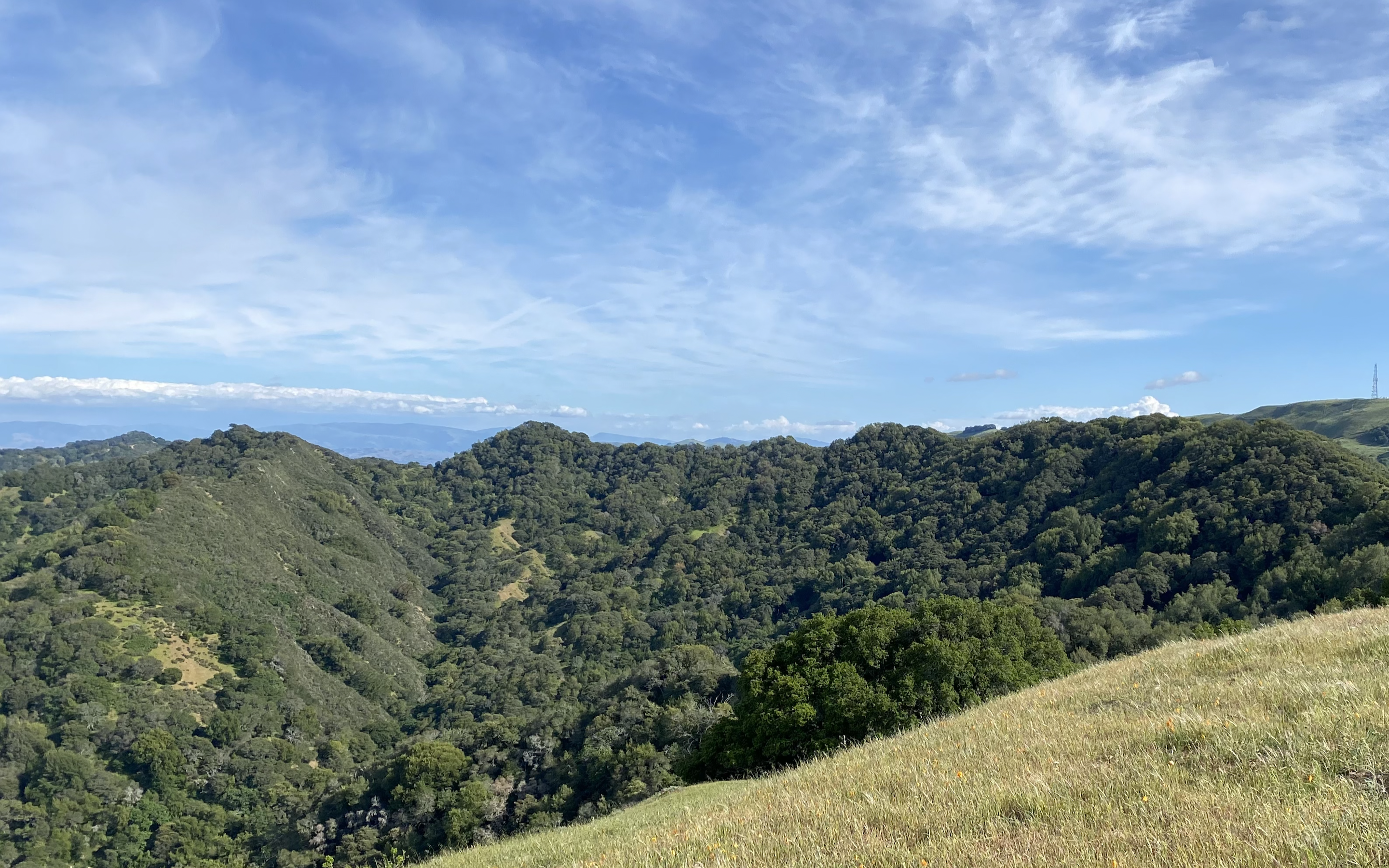
One of the many canyons that flank Las Trampas Ridge. The eastern side of the ridge is covered in forests of Coast Live Oak, Valley oak and California bay (April 26th, 2021)

Las Trampas Ridge exists at the intersection of multiple microclimates and is thus host to a number of different habitats ranging from moist coastal California oak woodland to grasslands, savanna and chaparral. Throughout the year, but particularly in the summer, fogs originate off the coast of California and are brought inland by prevailing winds. Las Trampas Ridge acts as a barrier to the incoming fog, trapping its moisture. On shaded eastern and northern facing slopes, there are extensive forests of Coast live oak, Valley oak, California bay and California buckeye. Exposed west and south facing slopes are often covered in annual grasslands and chaparral.

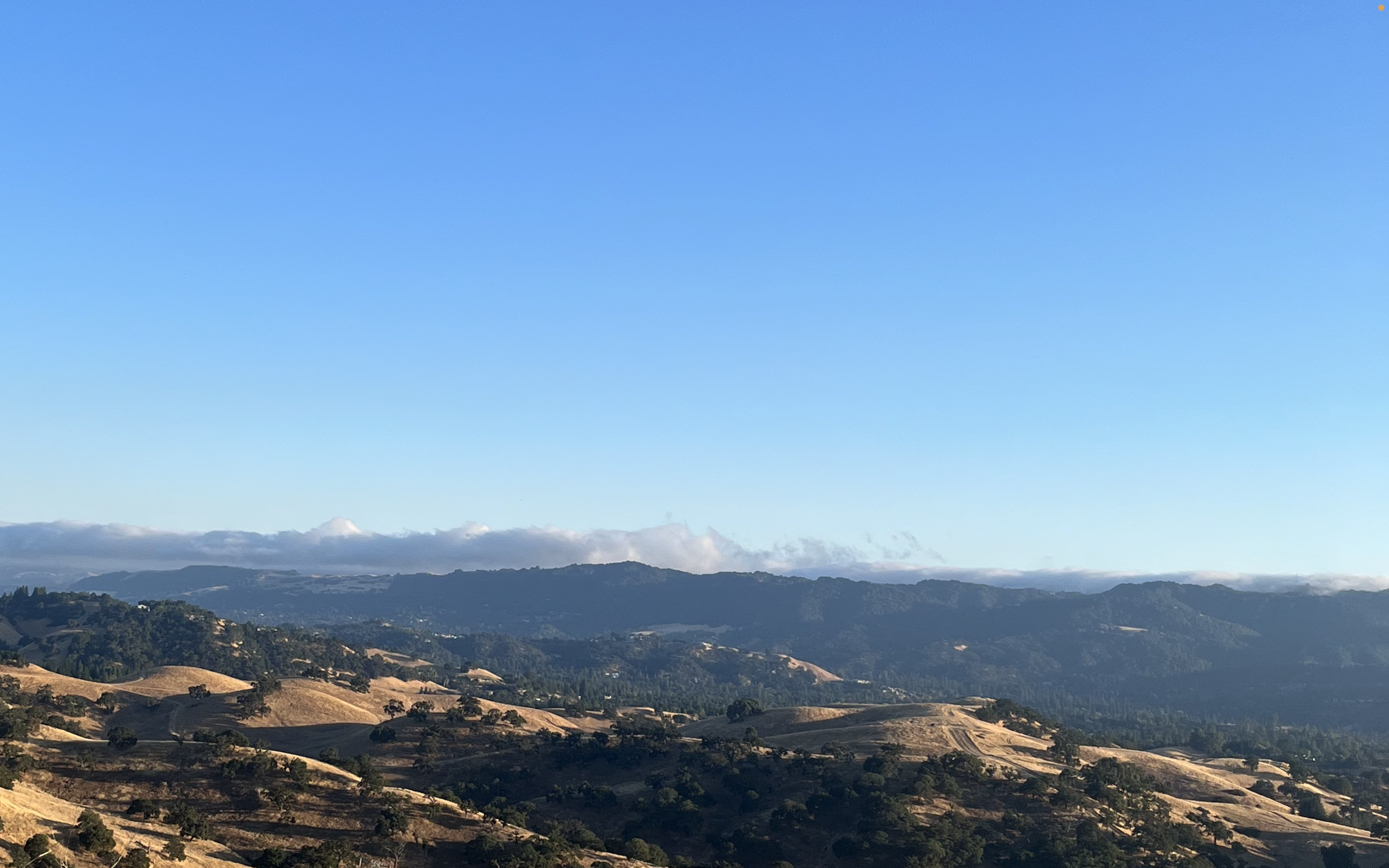
Fog crossing Las Trampas Ridge as seen from across the San Ramon Valley on Shell Ridge in Walnut Creek, California (August 2nd, 2023)

Las Trampas Ridge and its surroundings represent one of the last large areas of undeveloped land left in the East Bay.

Multiple creeks like Las Trampas Creek, Bollinger Creek, Tice Creek and Grizzly Creek, among numerous smaller intermittent streams, have their sources on Las Trampas Ridge. The streams originating on Las Trampas Ridge all flow to the Walnut Creek watershed, which drains a significant portion of the San Ramon Valley and the northern East Bay to its outlet at Suisun Bay.

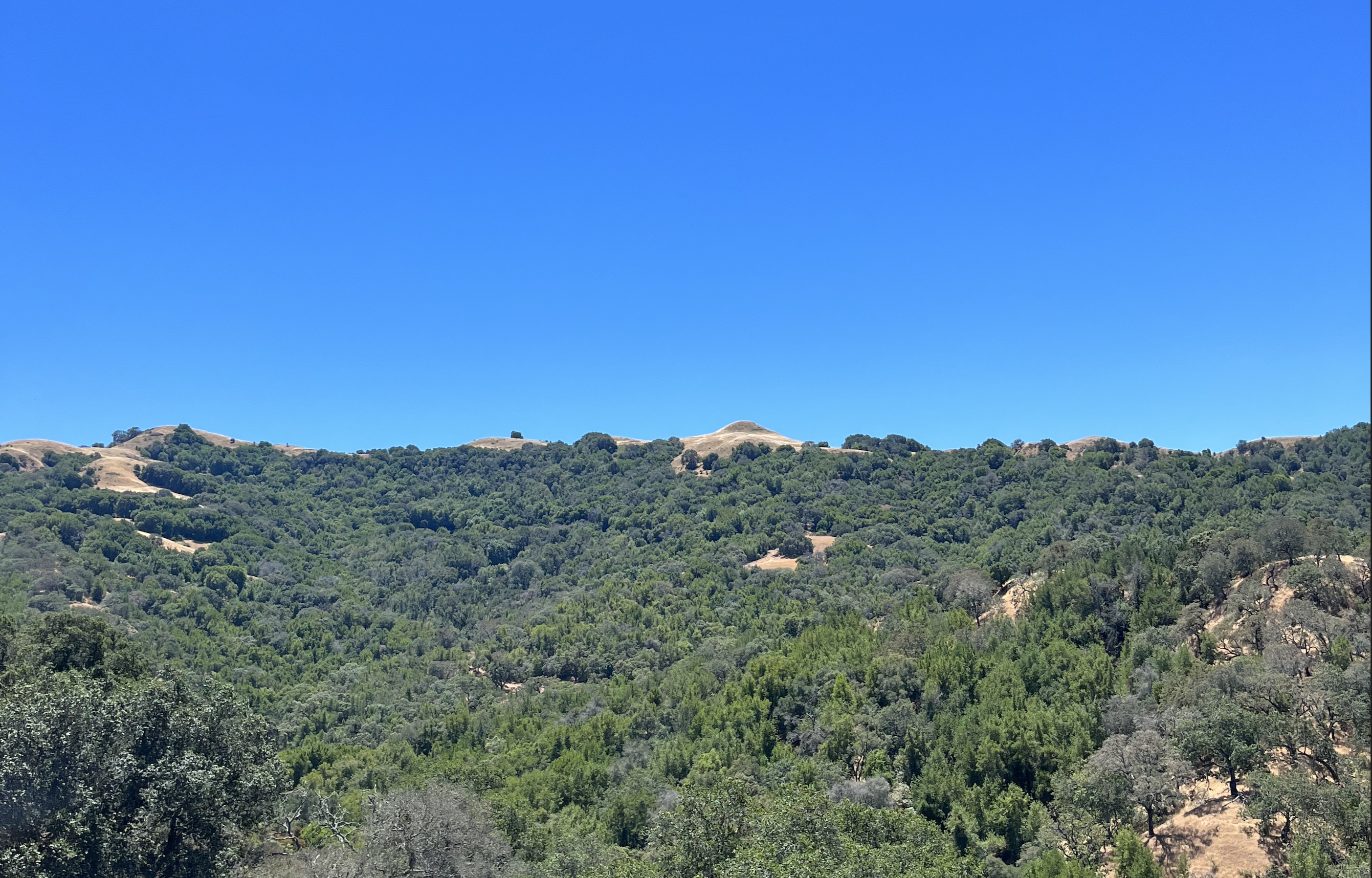
Foothills at the northern end of Las Trampas Ridge in Lafayette, California, covered in oak-laurel forest. The region does not receive rain from May to November (July 13th, 2022)

Riparian habitats on the ridge are host to waterfalls and tree species like Bigleaf Maple and White Alder. Las Trampas Ridge's creeks and seeps are home to endangered amphibians such as the Coastal Range newt.

Black-tailed deer, coyote, bobcats, gray foxes and a variety of other mammal species inhabit Las Trampas Ridge in great numbers. Deer can often be seen grazing the meadows among cattle. Wild turkeys are common among the forests in the area. Invasive wild boar are also frequently seen on the ridge, as it provides excellent habitat for the species. Less frequently seen and only occasionally present are mountain lions.

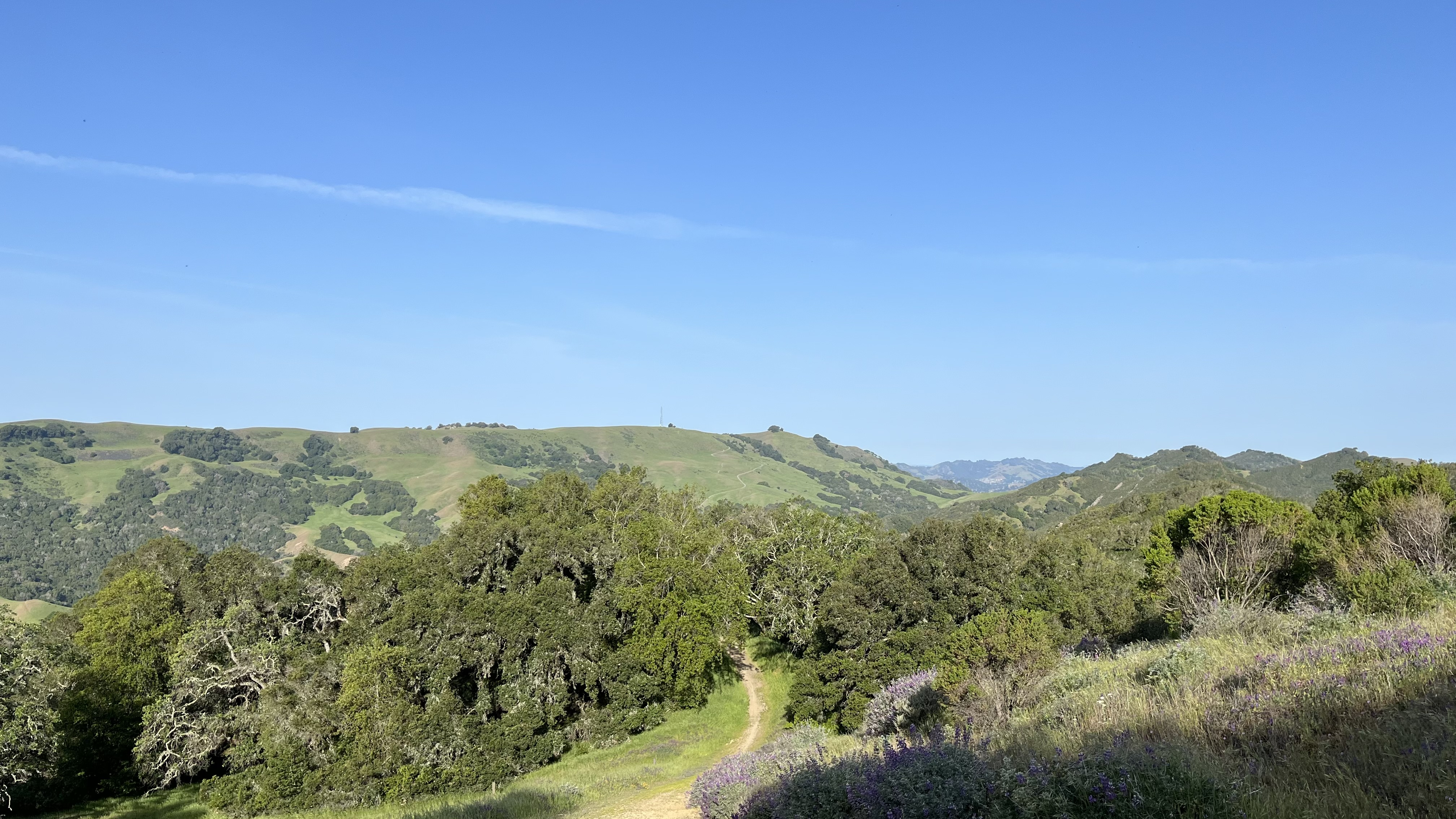
Rocky Ridge as seen from Las Trampas Ridge (April 8, 2022)

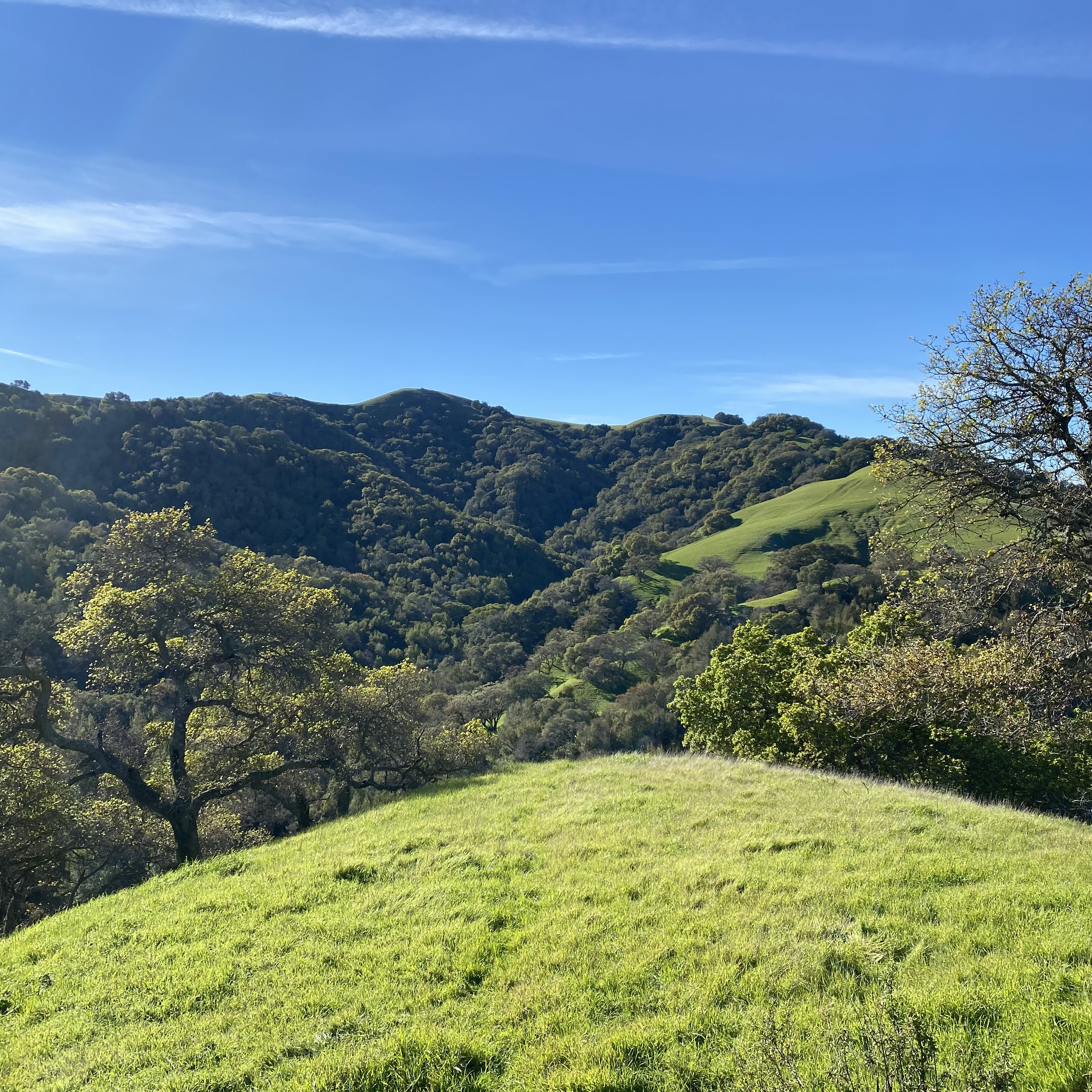
The upper canyon of Grizzly Creek, a tributary of Las Trampas Creek, at the northern end of Las Trampas Ridge (January 1, 2022)

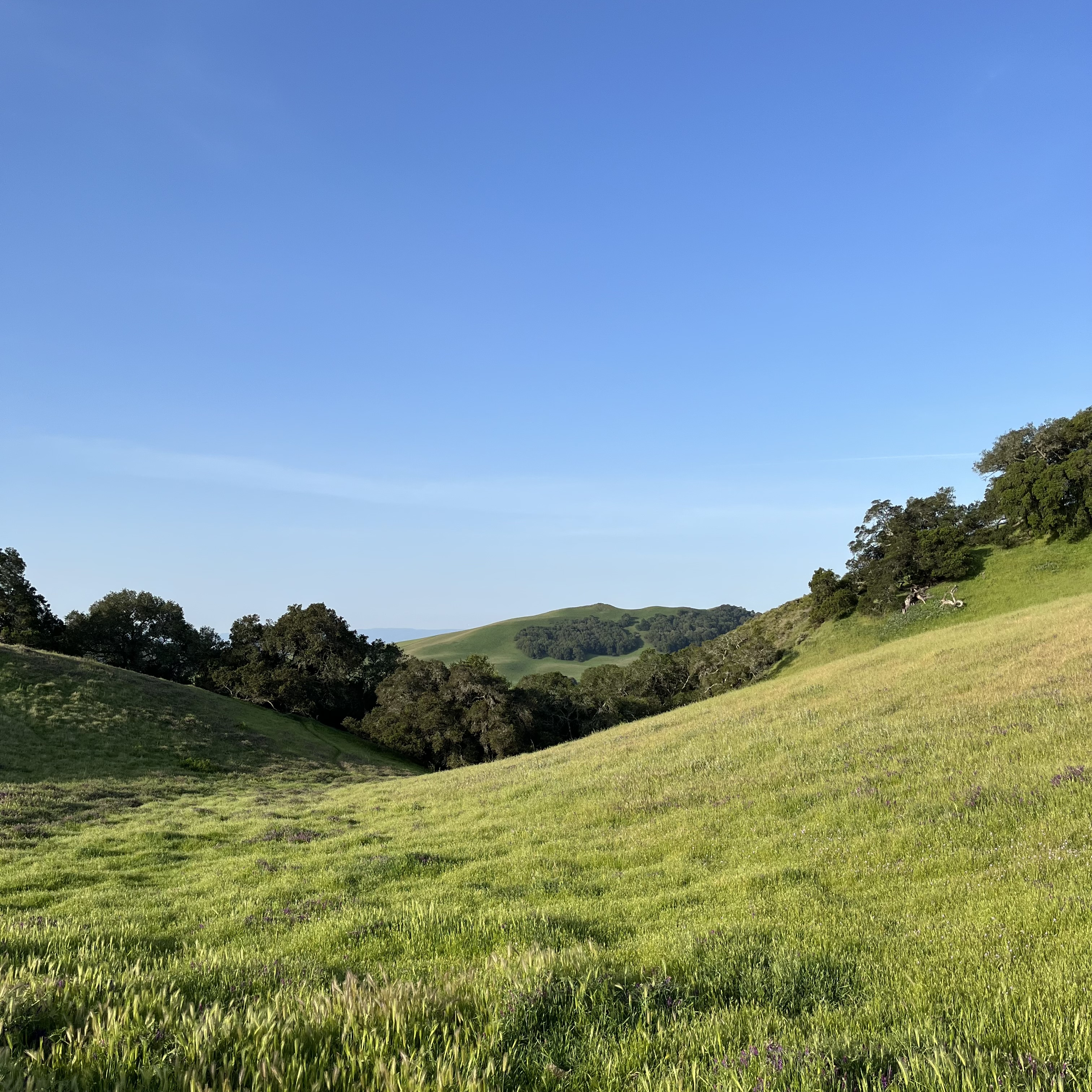
Habitat typical of Las Trampas Ridge and much of the inner East Bay (April 8, 2022)

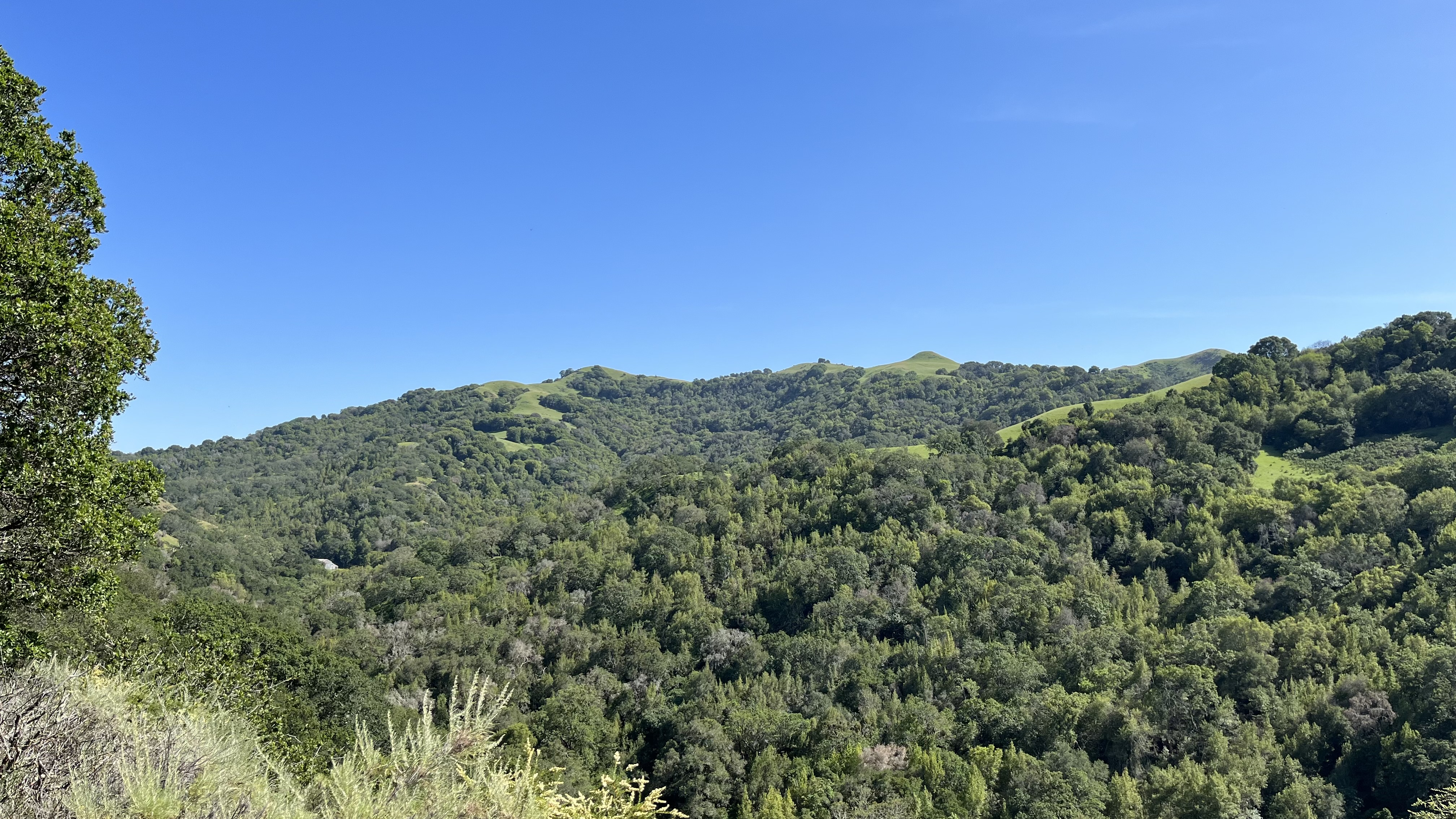
Northern and Eastern-facing areas on Las Trampas Ridge are thickly forested with oak and laurel trees (April 9, 2022)

== See also ==
- Las Trampas Regional Wilderness
- Las Trampas Peak
- Las Trampas Creek
- Grizzly Creek
- Rocky Ridge
- San Francisco Bay Area
