= Las Trampas Peak =

Mountain in SF Bay Area Coast Ranges

- La Sierra de Las Trampas
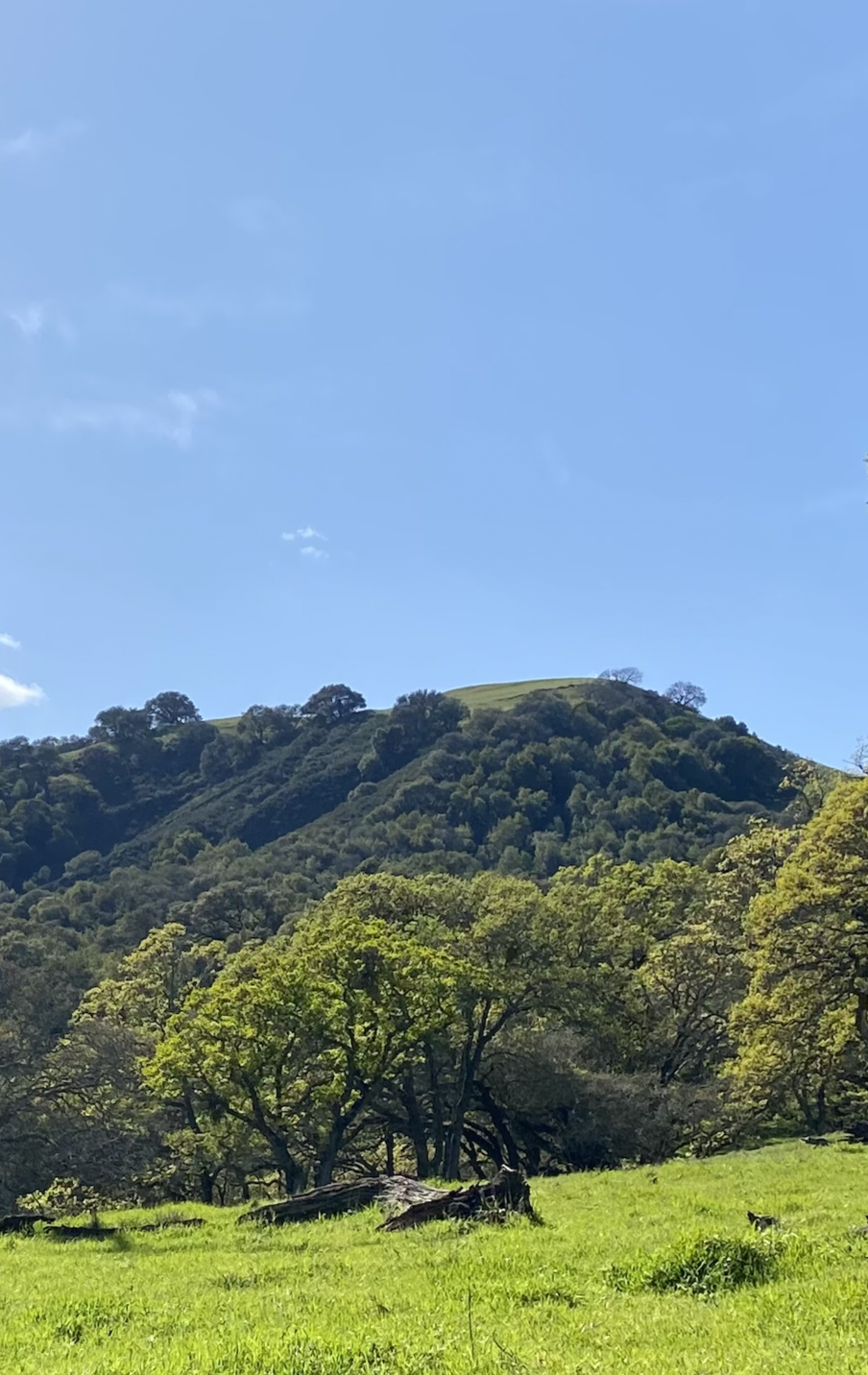
- Las Trampas Peak in the early spring near Alamo, CA

Highest point
- Elevation: 1,827 ft (557 m)
- Coordinates: 37°50′00″N 122°03′53″W

Geography
- Location: Contra Costa County, CA
- Country: United States
- State: California
- County: Contra Costa County
- Parent range: Inner Coast Ranges

Geology
- Rock type: sedimentary

Las Trampas Peak is a 1,827 ft (557 m) peak in the Inner Coast Ranges in western Contra Costa County, California, in the San Francisco Bay Area.

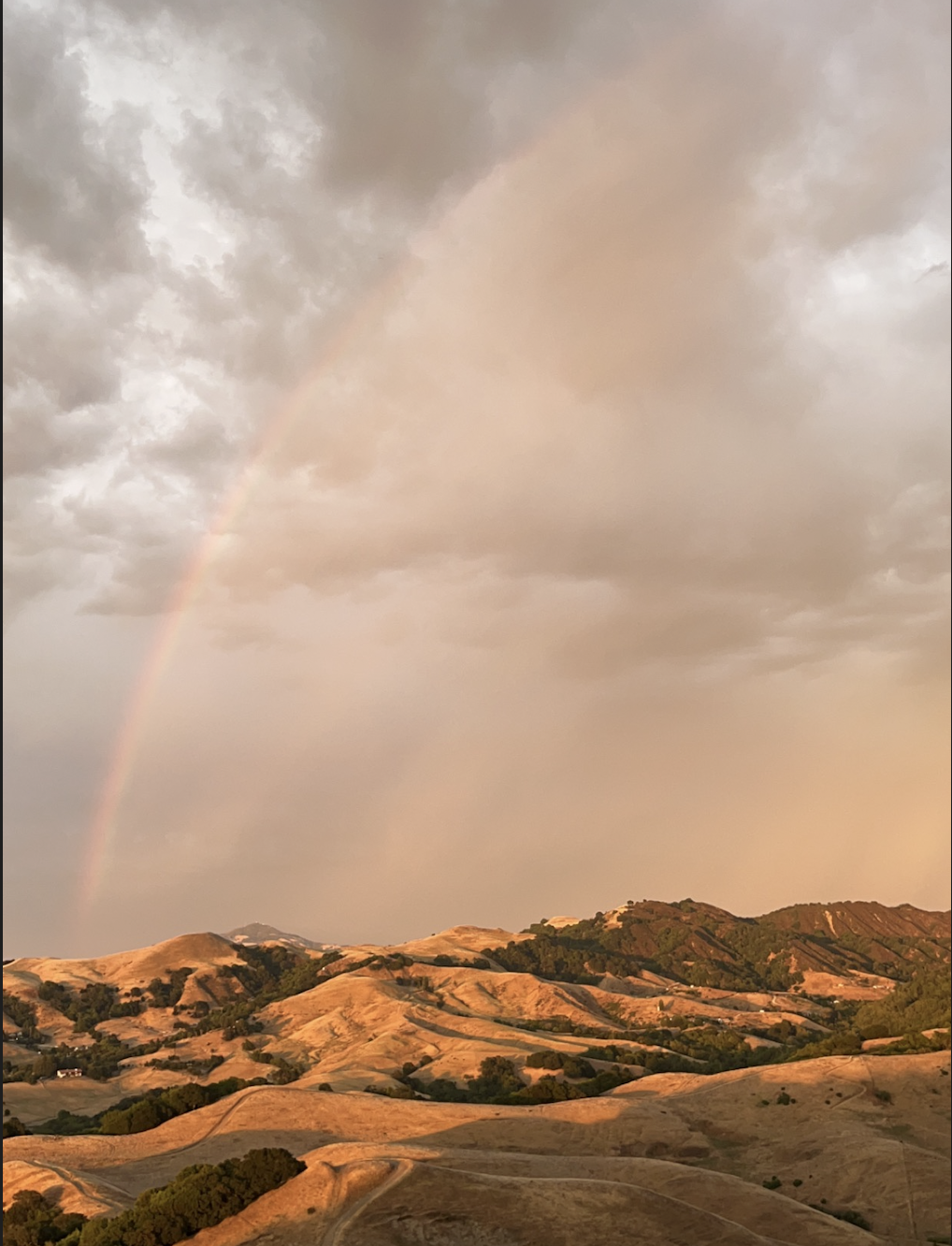
Las Trampas Peak as seen from the west under a rainbow (August 13th, 2023)

== Etymology ==
The name "Las Trampas" or "the traps" in Spanish, is derived from the indigenous Saclan Bay Miwok peoples' technique of using the area's steep canyons to trap herds of Tule elk and other game species for hunting.

== Geography ==
Las Trampas Peak and its surrounding environs are located in the Inner Coast Ranges in the San Francisco Bay Area's Contra Costa County, more specifically in the Berkeley Hills subrange.

The peak is the apex and terminus of an approximately 8 mile-long north-south running ridge composed of Miocene marine sedimentary rock, known as Las Trampas Ridge.

Las Trampas Creek and its tributary Grizzly Creek begin on the mountain. Las Trampas Creek is one of the largest sub-watersheds within the Walnut Creek Basin, comprising an area over 17,000 sq acres in size.

== Geology ==
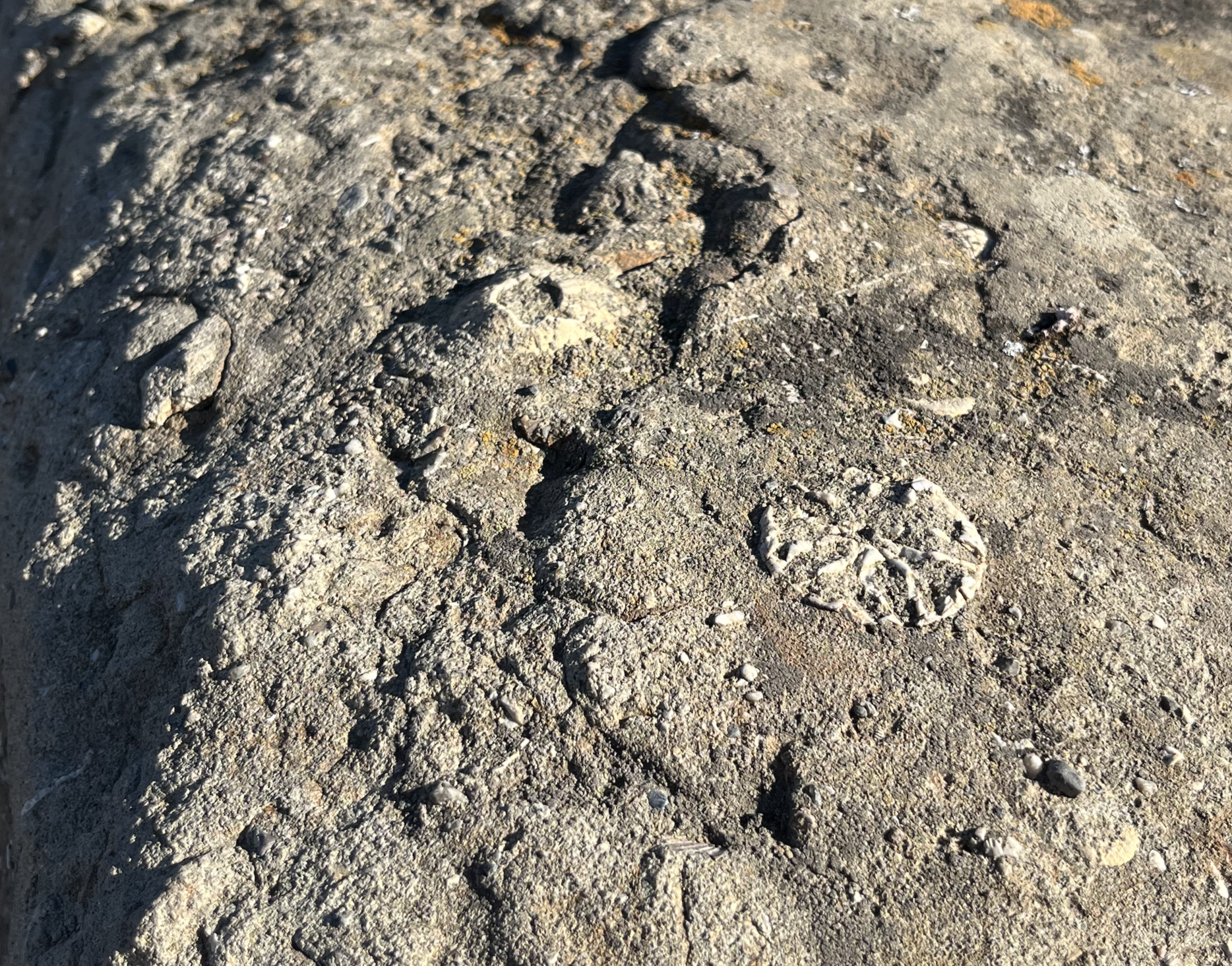
Fossilized sand dollars in sandstone from the Miocene on outcrops just below Las Trampas Peak (October 8th, 2022)

Like much of Contra Costa County, Las Trampas peak and its surroundings are largely composed of fossiliferous sedimentary rocks from the Great Valley Sequence. These formations have been heavily altered by millions of years of faulting and rifting, a process that is still ongoing.

The region around Las Trampas Peak is tectonically active, with earthquakes being a common occurrence.

Certain bands in the area contain abundant fossils of prehistoric sea life from the Miocene epoch (~23 mya to ~5 mya)

== Ecology ==
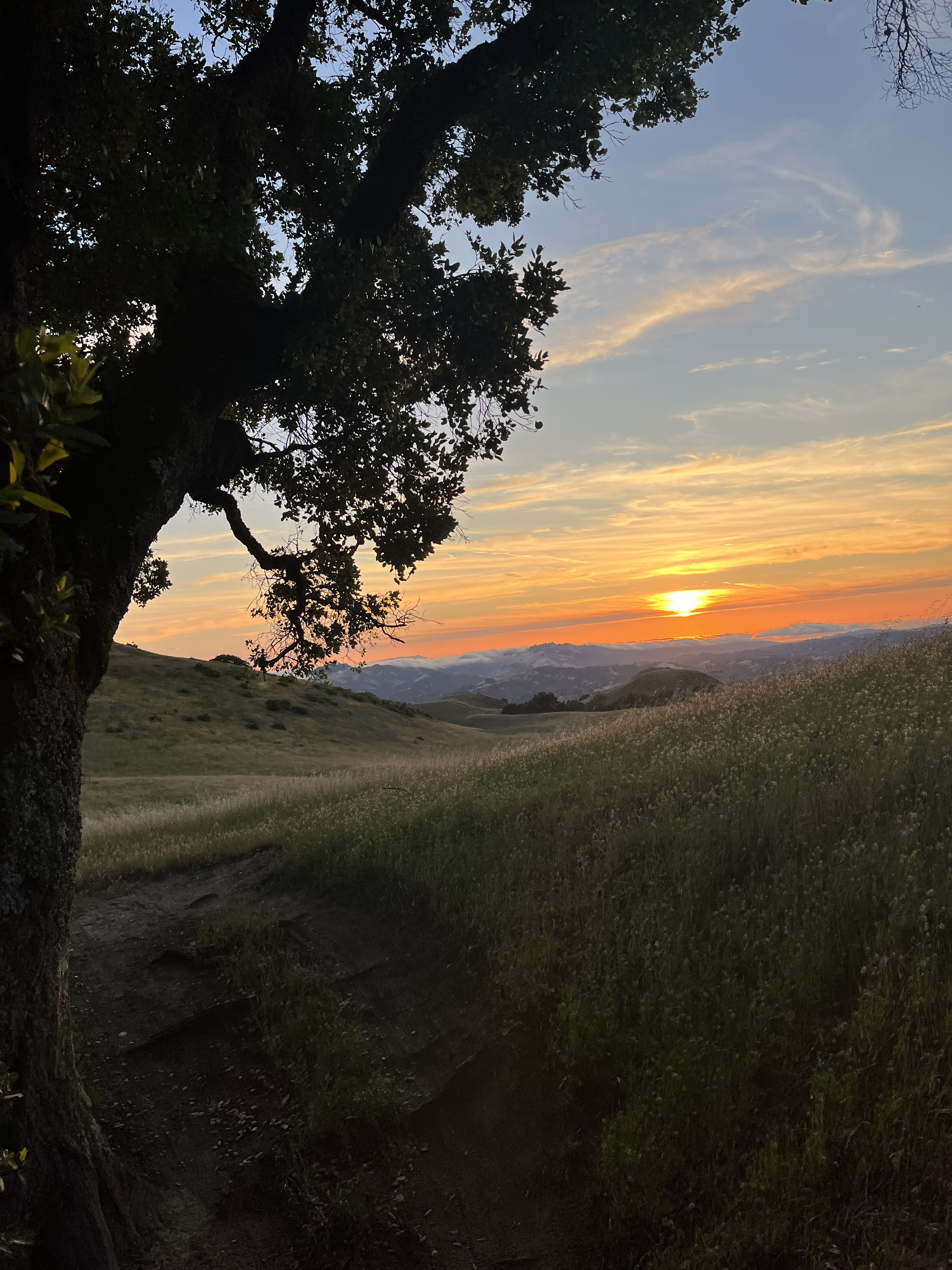
Fog flows over the Berkeley Hills during a summer sunset, as seen from Las Trampas Peak (June 13th, 2023)

Due to its location within a protected wilderness area, Las Trampas Regional Wilderness, Las Trampas Peak and its surrounding hills are home to many species of wildlife including Columbian black-tail deer, Coyotes, Bobcats and numerous species of birds.

The north slope of the mountain is thickly forested with California Coast Ranges mixed evergreen forest, dominant trees include Coast Live Oak, Valley oak and california bay among others.

The exposed south-facing slope of the mountain is covered in Chaparral.

The east and west sides of the mountain are both mixtures of forest, scrub and grassland, largely depending on the local geology.
