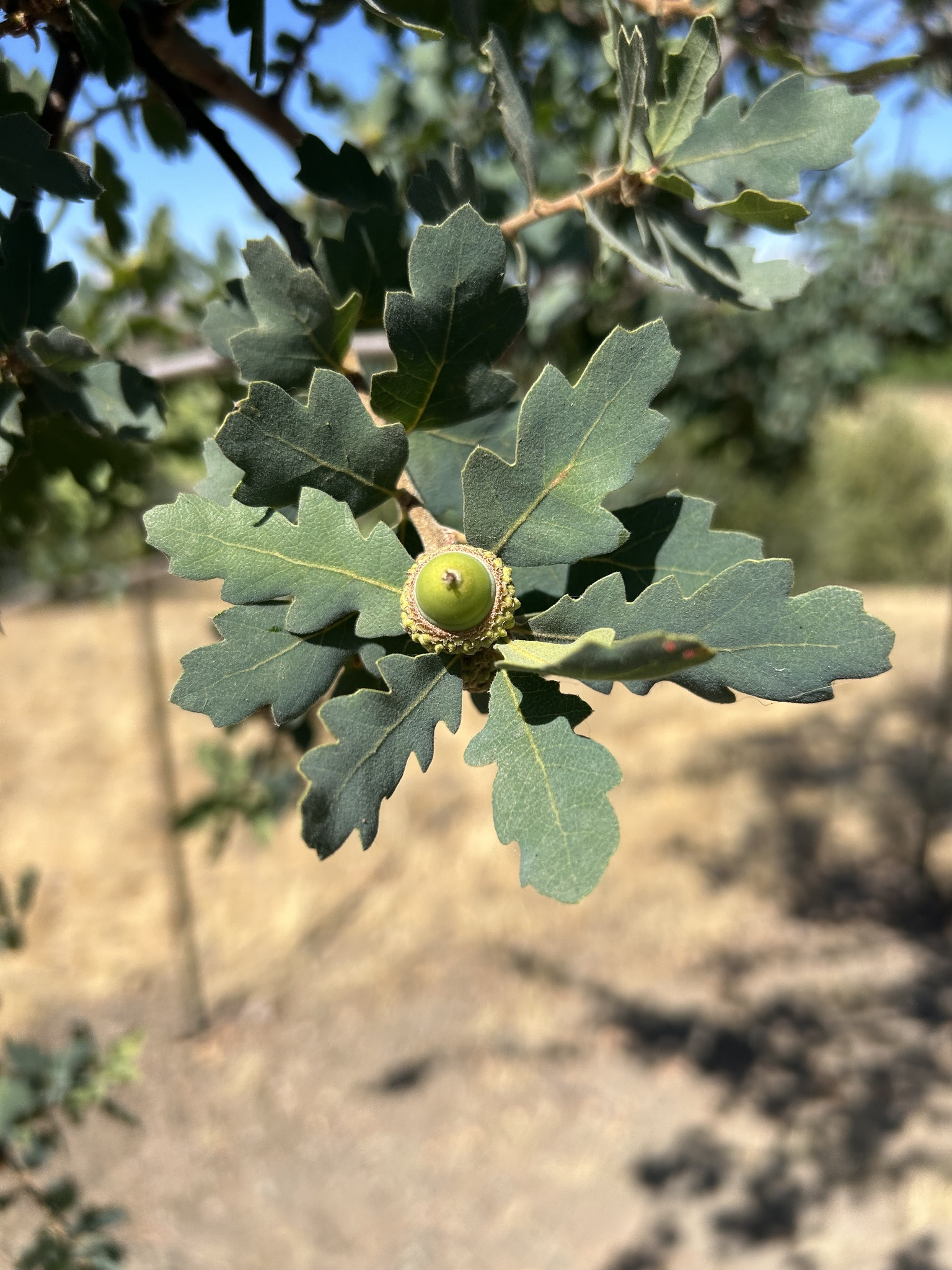

Scientific classification
- Kingdom: Plantae
- Clade: Tracheophytes
- Clade: Angiosperms
- Clade: Eudicots
- Clade: Rosids
- Order: Fagales
- Family: Fagaceae
- Genus: Quercus
- Species: Q. × jolonensis

Binomial name
- Quercus × jolonensis Sarg.

Synonyms
- Quercus dumosa var. alvordiana (Sarg.) Jeps.

= Quercus × jolonensis =

Hybrid species of oak tree

Quercus × jolonensis, the Jolon oak, is a hybrid oak in the genus Quercus. It was originally reported from the area of Jolon, California. It is a naturally occurring hybrid between Quercus douglasii and Quercus lobata. This hybrid is widespread throughout the Inner Coast Ranges & Sierra Nevada foothills where both species overlap.

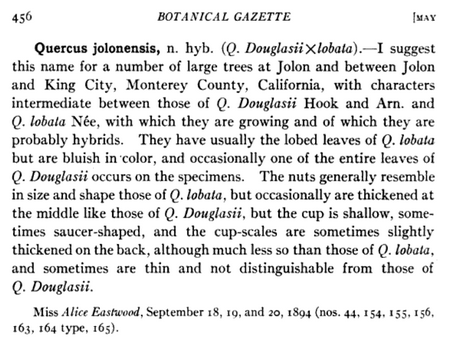
Original 1918 description of Quercus jolonensis in the Botanical Gazetter by Alice Eastwood

== History ==
In 1894 Alice Eastwood wrote:

I suggest this name for a number of large trees at Jolon and between Jolon and King City Monterey County, California with characters intermediate between those of Q. Douglasii Hook and Arn and Q. lobata Née with which they are growing and of which they are probably hybrids. They have usually the lobed leaves of Q. lobata but are bluish in color and occasionally one of the entire leaves of Q. Douglasii occurs on the specimens. The nuts generally resemble in size and shape those of Q. lobata but occasionally are thickened at the middle like those of Q. Douglasii but the cup is shallow some times saucer shaped and the cup scales are sometimes slightly thickened on the back although much less so than those of Q. lobata and sometimes are thin and not distinguishable from those of Q. Douglasii. Miss Alice Eastwood September 18 19 and 20 1894
