= Yellow pine (disambiguation) =

Yellow pine is a number of conifer species which yield similar strong wood.

Yellow pine may also refer to:

== Plants ==
- Pinus palustris, longleaf pine
- Pinus echinata, shortleaf pine
- Pinus elliottii, slash pine
- Pinus jeffreyi, Jeffrey pine
- Pinus ponderosa, ponderosa pine
- Pinus taeda, loblolly pine
- Pinus strobus, eastern white pine
- Pinus sylvestris, Scots pine
- Halocarpus biformis, yellow pine or pink pine, a tree endemic to New Zealand

== Places ==
- Yellow Pine, Alabama
- Yellow Pine, Idaho
- Yellow Pine, Louisiana

== See also ==
- Bull pine
- List of Pinus species
