= Grizzly Creek, Contra Costa County =

Stream in California, US

Grizzly Creek
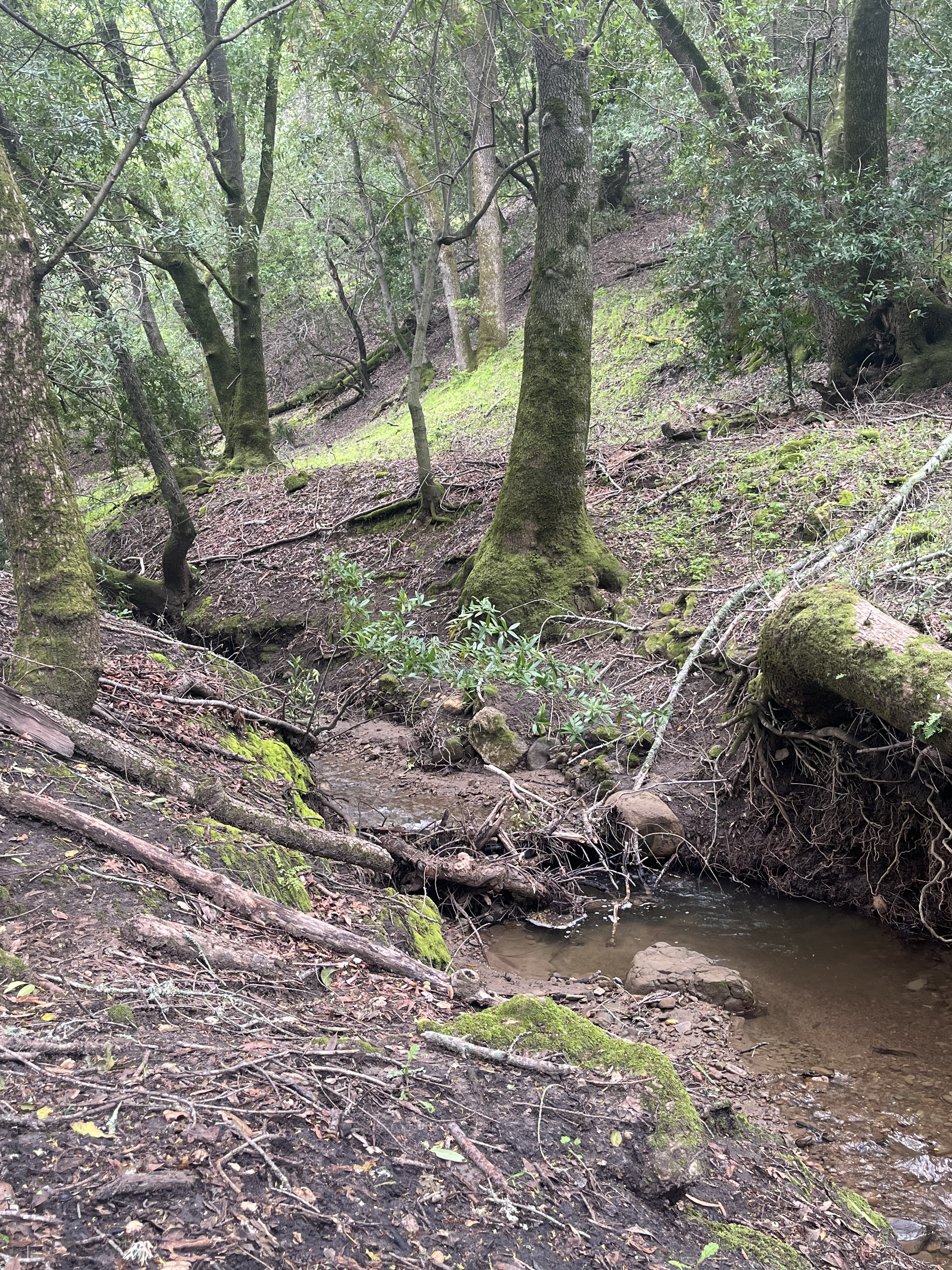
- Grizzly Creek near its source in Lafayette, California

Location
- Country: United States
- State: California
- Region: Bay Area
- District: Contra Costa County

Physical characteristics
- Mouth: Las Trampas Creek
  - coordinates: 37°52′11″N 122°05′51″W
- Length: ~2.5 miles

Basin features
- Cities: Lafayette, CA

Grizzly Creek is a 3.2-mile-long northwest-flowing perennial stream in Contra Costa County, California. It is a major tributary of Las Trampas Creek, which is part of the larger Walnut Creek watershed, which in turn drains into Suisun Bay.

The creek gets its name from the presence of California grizzly bear in its valley in historic times.

== Course ==
Grizzly Creek begins as multiple intermittent spring-fed streams at 1,827' above sea level on the north slope of Las Trampas Peak in Las Trampas Regional Wilderness. After a steep descent northward, the tributaries join together near the head of Grizzly Creek canyon, where the main stem of Grizzly Creek is formed.

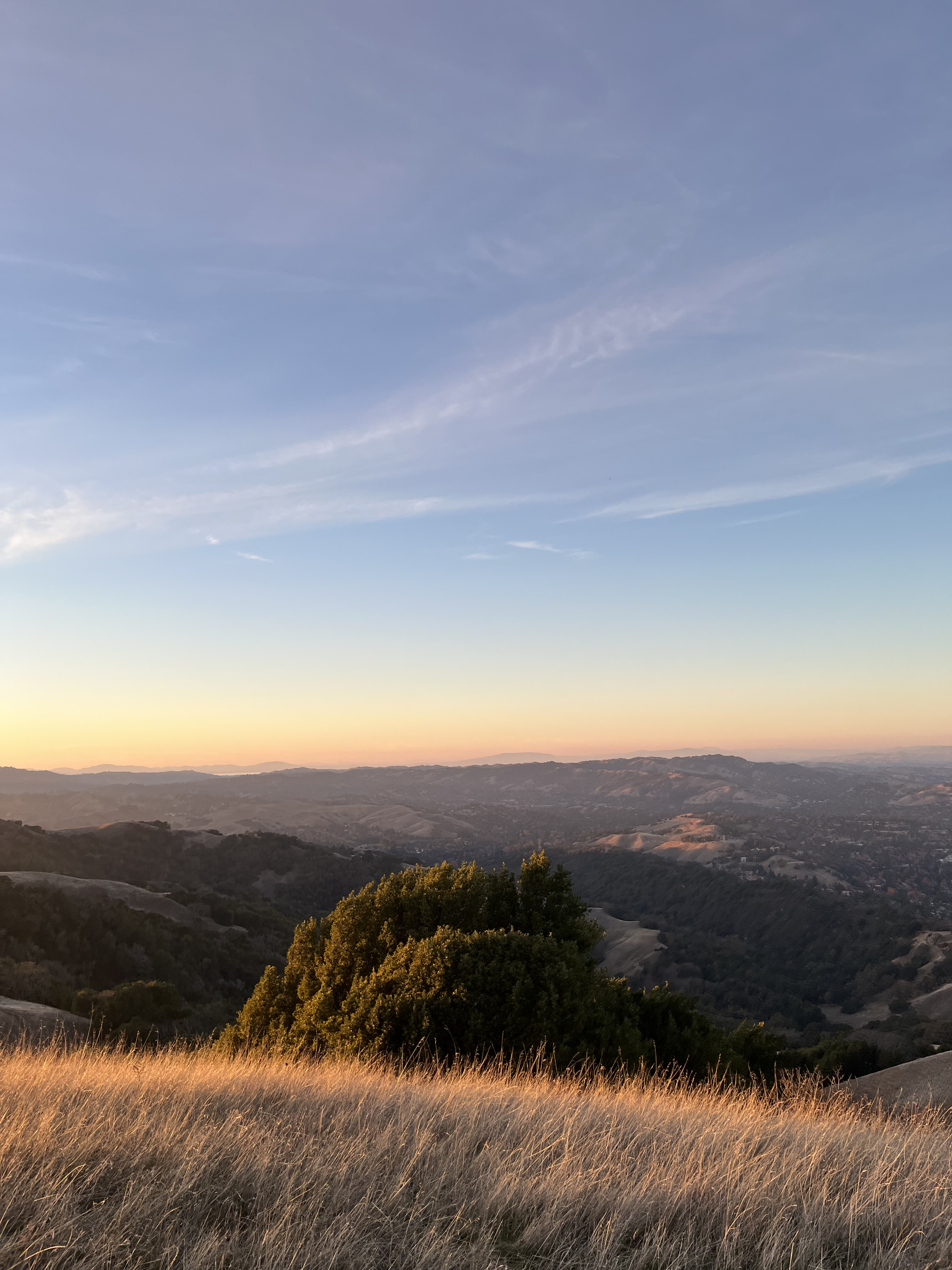
A view from the creek's source on Las Trampas Peak encompasses the entire watershed as well as that of Las Trampas Creek downstream (September, 2020)

The entirety of the creek's course is confined within a small valley flanked by steep hills. From there, Grizzly Creek maintains a relatively straight heading as it meanders for approximately 2.5 miles north-northwest, passing, through the suburban community of Burton Valley in Lafayette, California. It receives input in Burton Valley primarily from street runoff as well as a few short and ephemeral tributaries in the surrounding hills.

Not far downstream from where Grizzly Creek enters Lafayette Community Park, it joins Las Trampas Creek.

The stream's course is altered in many places by suburban development including road culverts, dams and channelization.

== Historical Ecology ==
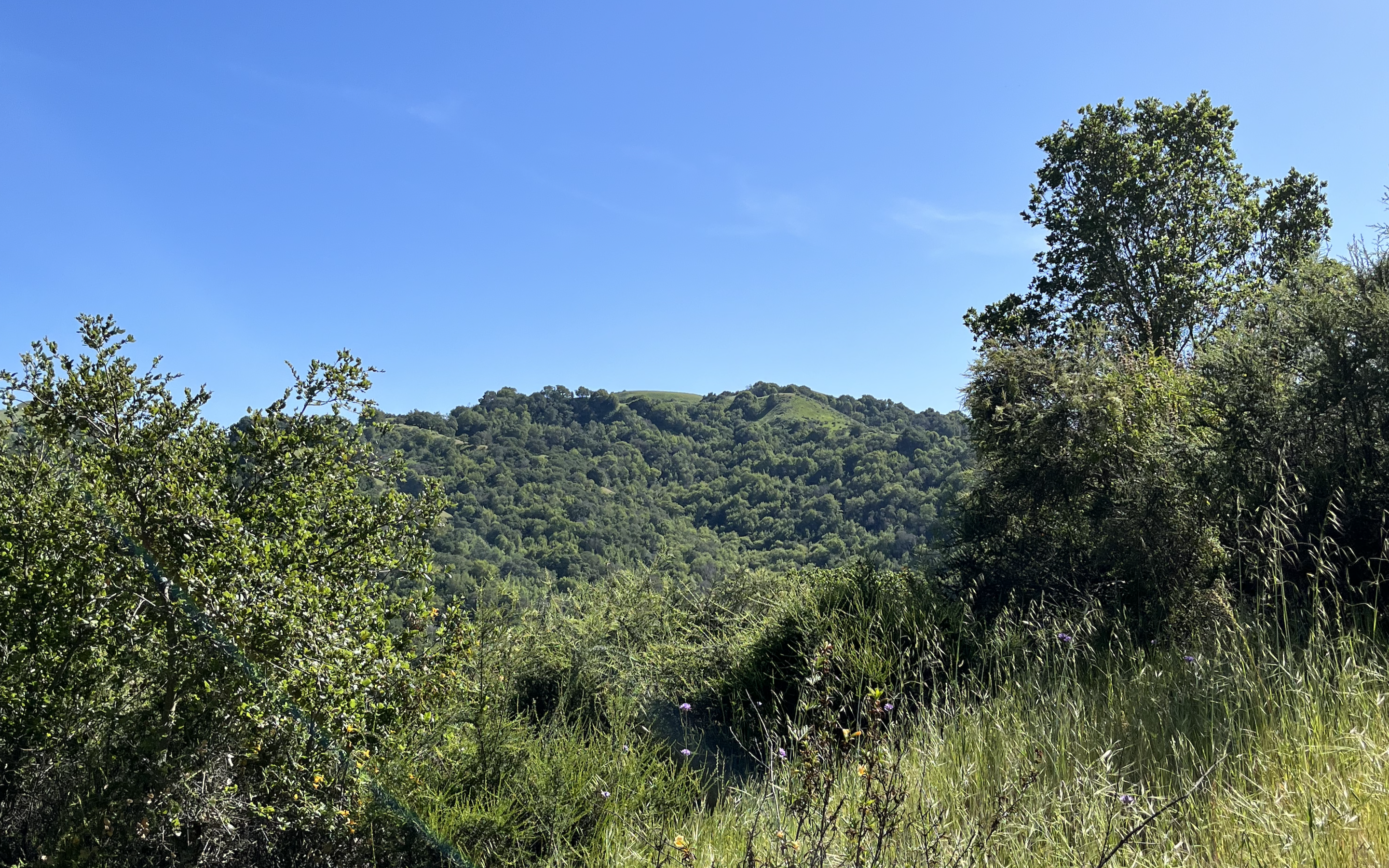
A view of the hills near the source of Grizzly Creek (April, 2023)

Up until the 1770s, the land in and around the Grizzly Creek watershed was managed by the indigenous Saclan peoples, who hunted, gathered and made their homes along Grizzly Creek and nearby watersheds. The Valley Oak savanna that traced Grizzly Creek's course out of the hills provided the natives with their staple food source, acorns, among other resources. Very little evidence remains of indigenous habitation in the watershed today.

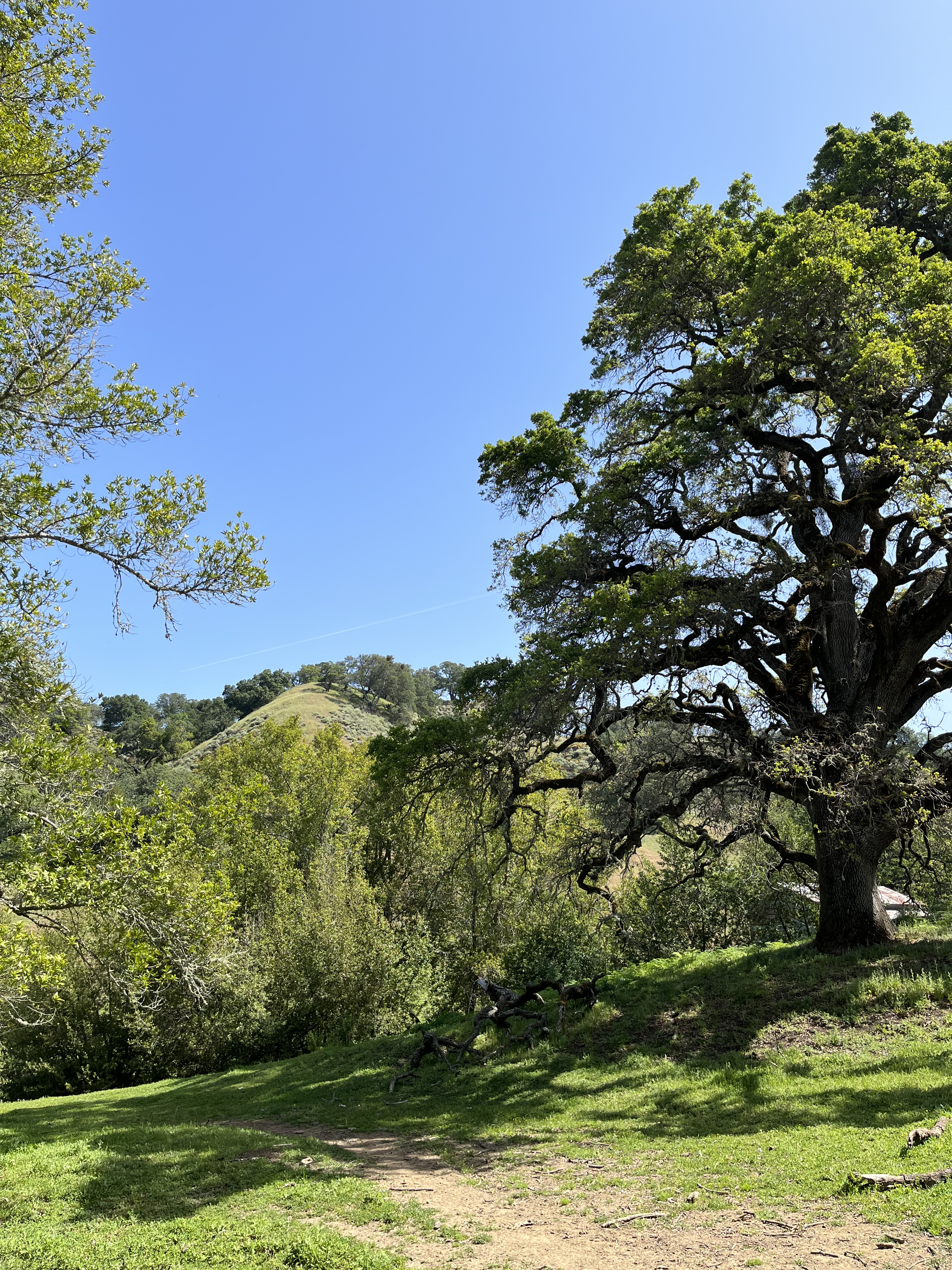
Cattle grazing operations are still carried out in the Upper Canyon (March, 2022)

In the late 18th and early 19th centuries, Grizzly Creek was included in the lands used by Mission San José to graze its massive herds of cattle, numbering in the thousands most years. The cattle brought European annual grasses and weeds that replaced the native perennial grasses in the meadows, drastically changing the character of the watershed's vegetation and the native peoples' ability to sustain themselves. Soil compaction caused by the herds also helped to damage native plant communities.

When California became a territory of the United States in 1850, agricultural development began in and around the Grizzly Creek watershed as waves of settlers came into the region. Vegetable agriculture in particular changed the ecology of the creek drastically.

The oak savanna and riparian habitats along the creek's course were cleared to make way for crops and the natural contour of the land was graded flat. Farmers initially planted wheat, and later fruits and vegetables. The land was heavily tilled and Lafayette farmers often complained of indigenous artifacts getting caught in their plows. To irrigate crops, artesian wells were dug which dramatically altered the hydrology of the watershed, making the land more arid.

Grizzly Creek likely still remained in a comparatively natural state during the time its valley was cultivated throughout 19th and 20th centuries. Farmers often left the habitats immediately along creek banks intact to prevent evaporation and erosion, hence the impressive collection of very old Valley oak and Coast Live Oak that still line the banks today.

It is believed that prior to the 1950s, Grizzly Creek was home to a population of Rainbow trout. Pollution and habitat degradation among other things has since caused this population to be extirpated from the watershed.

== Current State ==
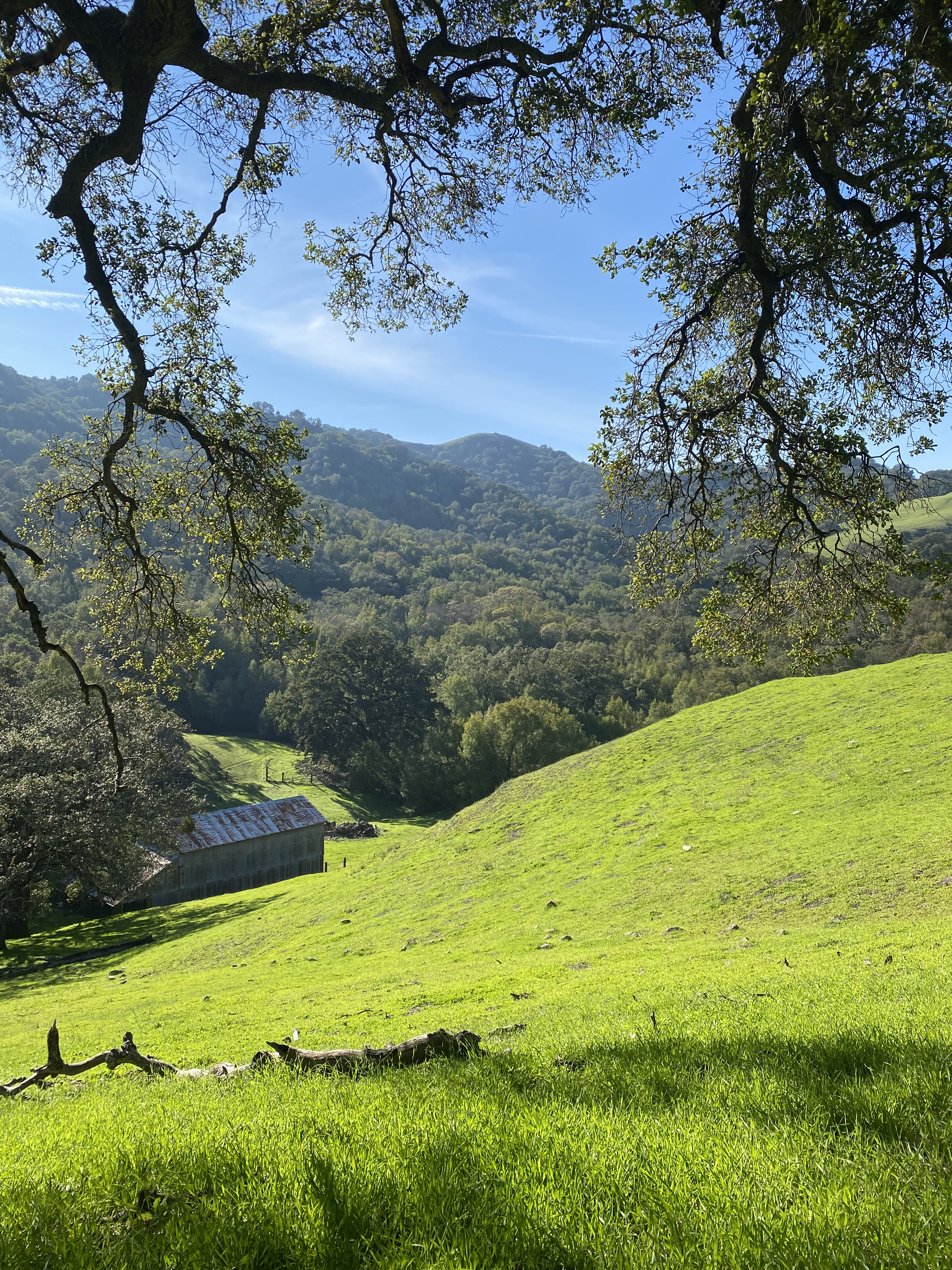
A photo of the upper watershed of Grizzly Creek, still in a somewhat natural state (November 23, 2021)

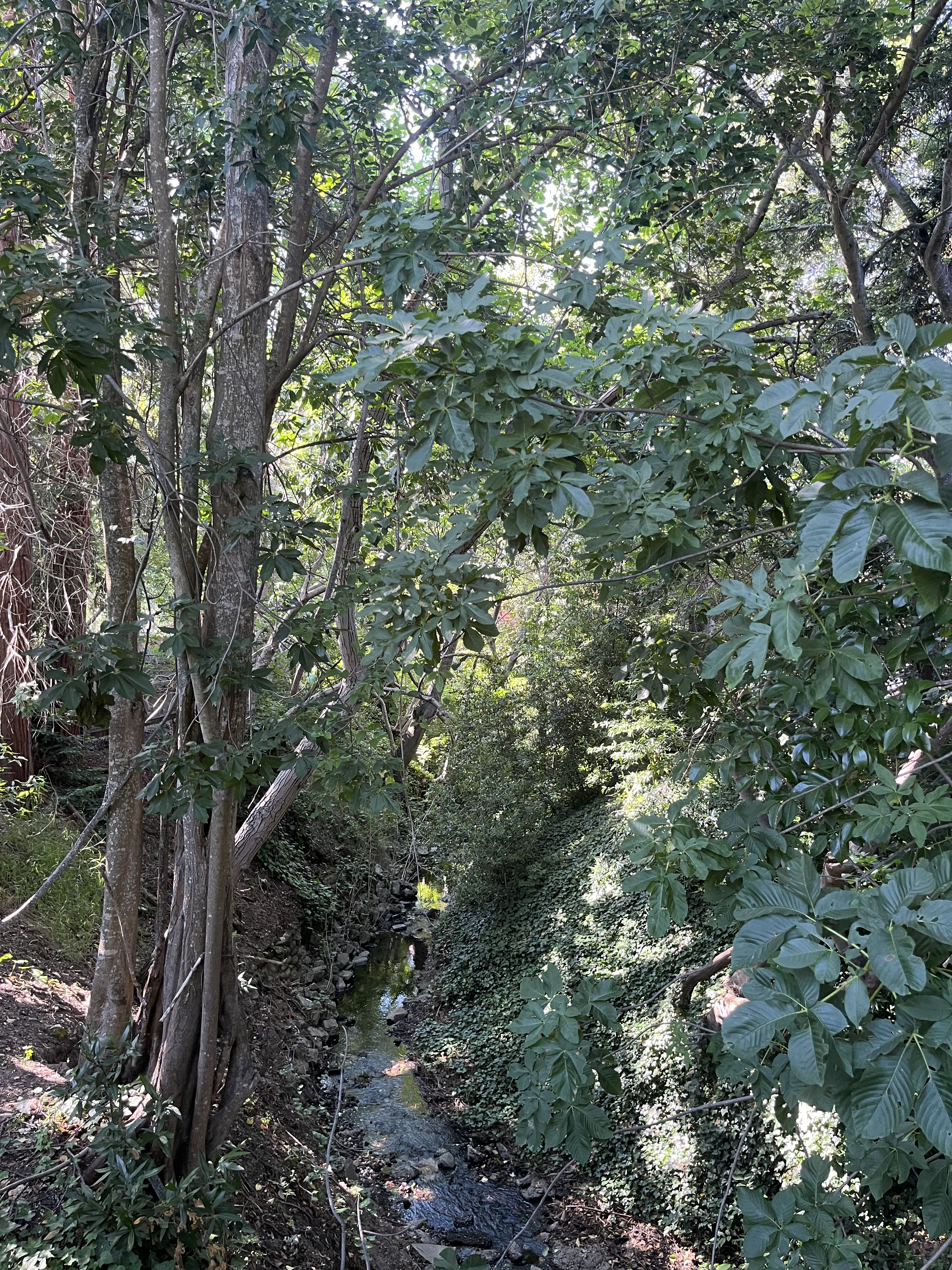
Grizzly Creek assumes a much different character once it reaches suburban developments just under 2 miles from its source.(June, 2023)

High in its watershed Grizzly Creek is in a more natural state, its banks heavily forested with different species of oaks, California Bay and White Alder. There is no development aside from an old barn and a fire road due to the area's status as an EBMUD land bank.

Lower in its course, the creek's natural habitat has been significantly altered. Suburban housing constructed throughout the second half of the 20th century lines the creek's banks. Lack of groundwater absorption and other issues have caused the creek's channel to become downcut.

Invasive plants like English ivy are pervasive along the creek for much of its course through the suburbs, many were introduced as ornamental plants.

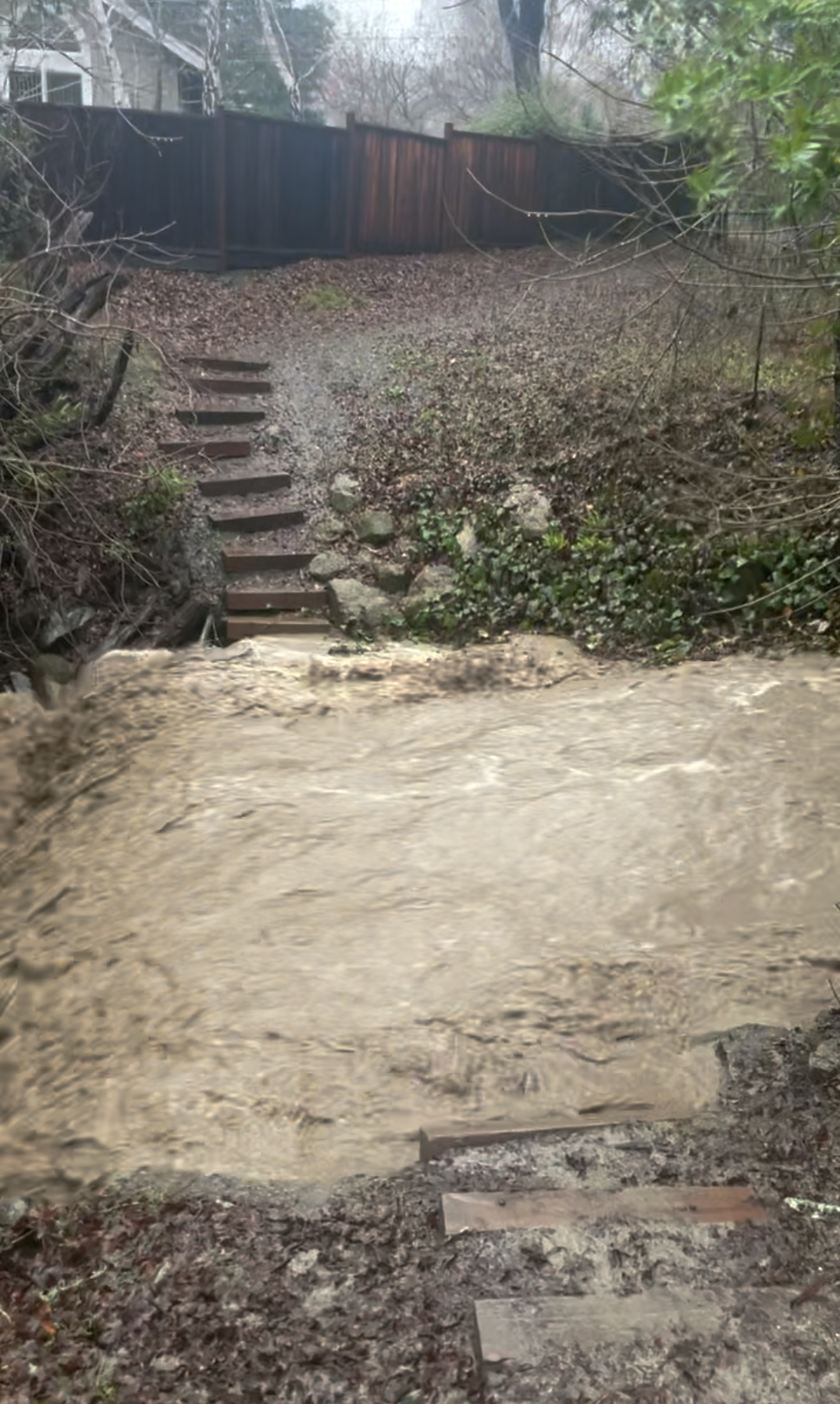
With no flood plain and an incised channel, Grizzly Creek can become a raging torrent during rain storms, posing a hazard to surrounding communities. (January, 2023)

As the creek's banks are so deeply downcut, and the soil being very easily erodible, property owners along much of the creek's course have lined the banks with various types of material to stem the erosion of the banks, including tarps, sandbags and riprap. There are a few sections in the lower section of the creek's course where it is not as downcut, particularly around its confluence with Las Trampas Creek in Lafayette Community Park.

As Grizzly Creek receives input from suburban street drains, its water quality is below standard, and it is not recommended that people drink from it.

In recent decades, as a result of flood control measures like check dams and the lack of any floodplain, Grizzly Creek has become prone to floods, particularly during the large winter rainstorms that are common to the region.

As a result of a number of factors, mostly stemming from suburban development, the course and structure of Grizzly Creek has been significantly altered since historic times.
