= Bull pine =

Bull pine is a common name for several species of North American "yellow pine" trees—Genus Pinus, Section Trifoliae ("American hard pines")—especially large, or unusually large and isolated, specimens of the following.

- Shortleaf pine (Pinus echinata)
- Slash pine (Pinus elliottii)
- Jeffrey pine (Pinus jeffreyi)
- Ponderosa pine (Pinus ponderosa)
- Gray pine (Pinus sabiniana)
- Loblolly pine (Pinus taeda)
