= Inner Coast Ranges =

Mountain range subsystem of the California Coast Ranges

The Inner Coast Ranges are a long mountain range subsystem of the California Coast Ranges, running generally north–south in western California, from Santa Barbara County north to the Klamath Mountains system.

== Geography ==
The term inner is a reference to the greater distance of these ranges inland/east from the Pacific Ocean's coast in California, compared to the outer of the Outer Coast Ranges subsystem, that are along or near the Pacific Coast.

=== Northern Inner Coast Ranges ===
The Northern Inner Coast Ranges are the eastern/inland section of the Northern Coast Ranges, running in Northern California from the North Bay region of the San Francisco Bay Area north to the Klamath Mountains system.

Ranges include the Mayacamas Mountains, Sonoma Mountains, and Vaca Mountains.

=== Southern Inner Coast Ranges ===
The Southern Inner Coast Ranges are the eastern/inland section of the Southern Coast Ranges, running in Northern, Central, and Southern California from the East Bay region of the San Francisco Bay Area south into Santa Barbara County.

Ranges include the Diablo Range, Gabilan Range, Sierra Madre Mountains, and Temblor Range.

== Ecology ==
Ecosystems within the Inner Coast Ranges include California oak woodland, chaparral, oak savanna and grassland. Dominant oak tree species include Live oak (Quercus agrifolia), Blue oak (Quercus douglasii), and Black oak (Quercus kelloggii).

Flora of the Southern Inner Coast Ranges includes:

- Quercus alvordiana, a natural hybrid oak occurring from Carmel Valley to the Tehachapi Mountains.
- Coulter pine (Pinus coulteri)
- Gray pine (Pinus sabiniana)

Flora of the Northern Inner Coast Ranges was described by Willis Linn Jepson early on, he was one of the first to do so. He noted the presence of Yellow pine and Sugar pine species. Other trees include Canyon live oak (Quercus chrysolepis).

== See also ==
- Natural history of the California Coast Ranges
