= Oakland, California =

City in California, United States

Oakland
- City
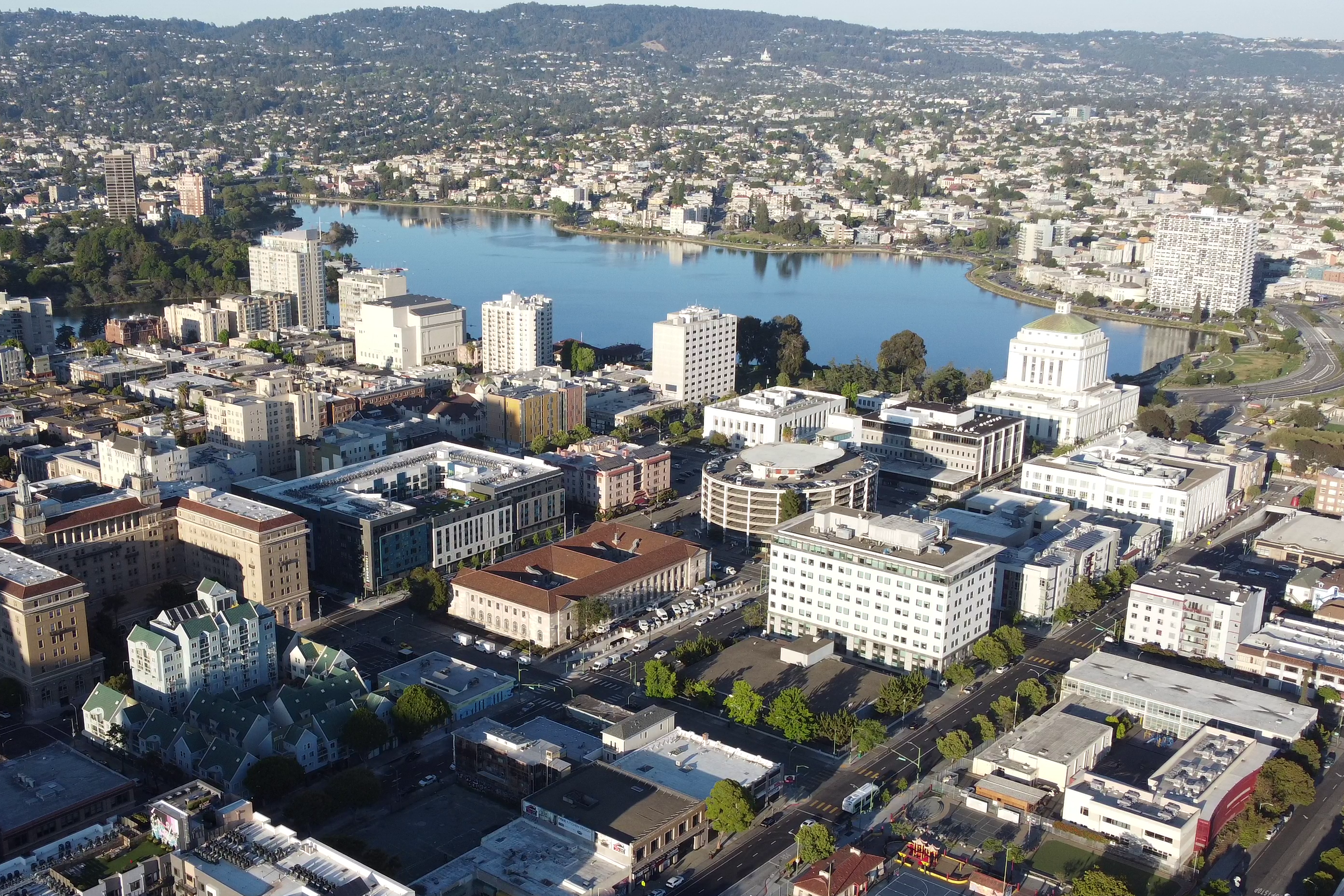
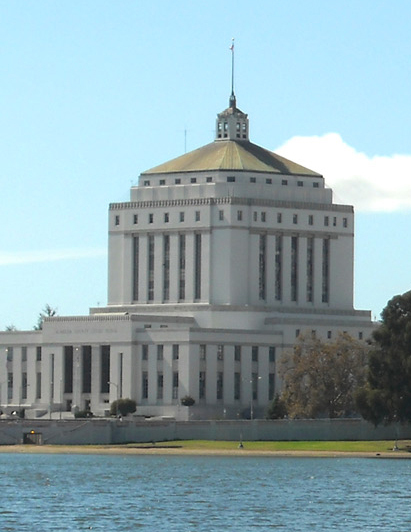
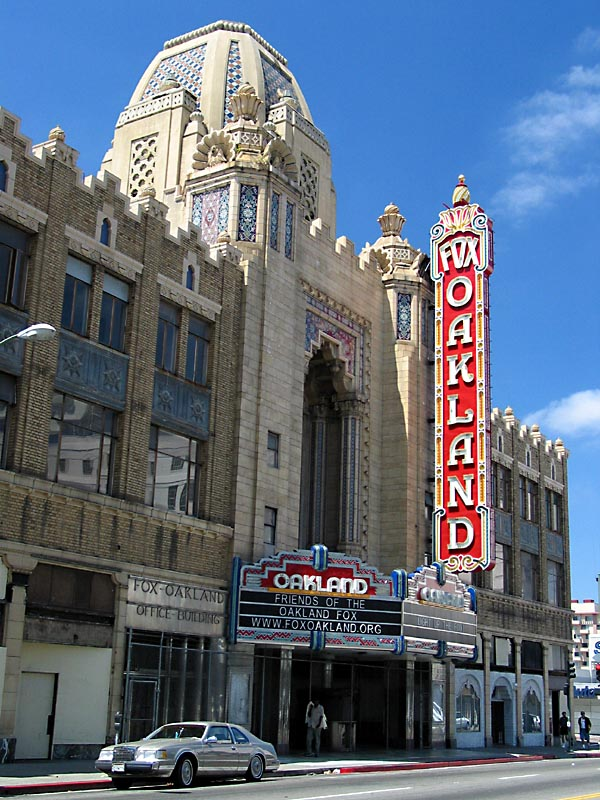
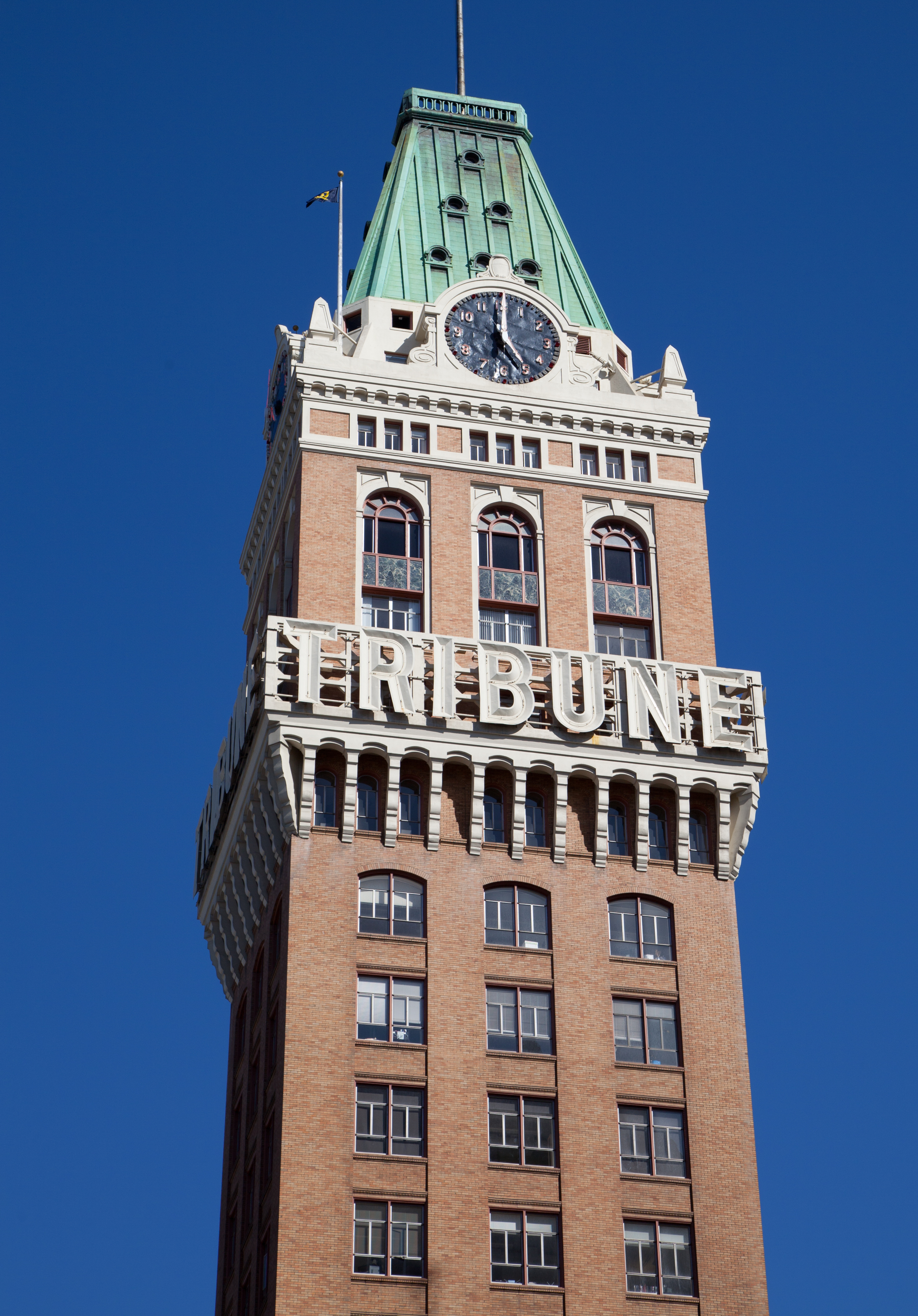
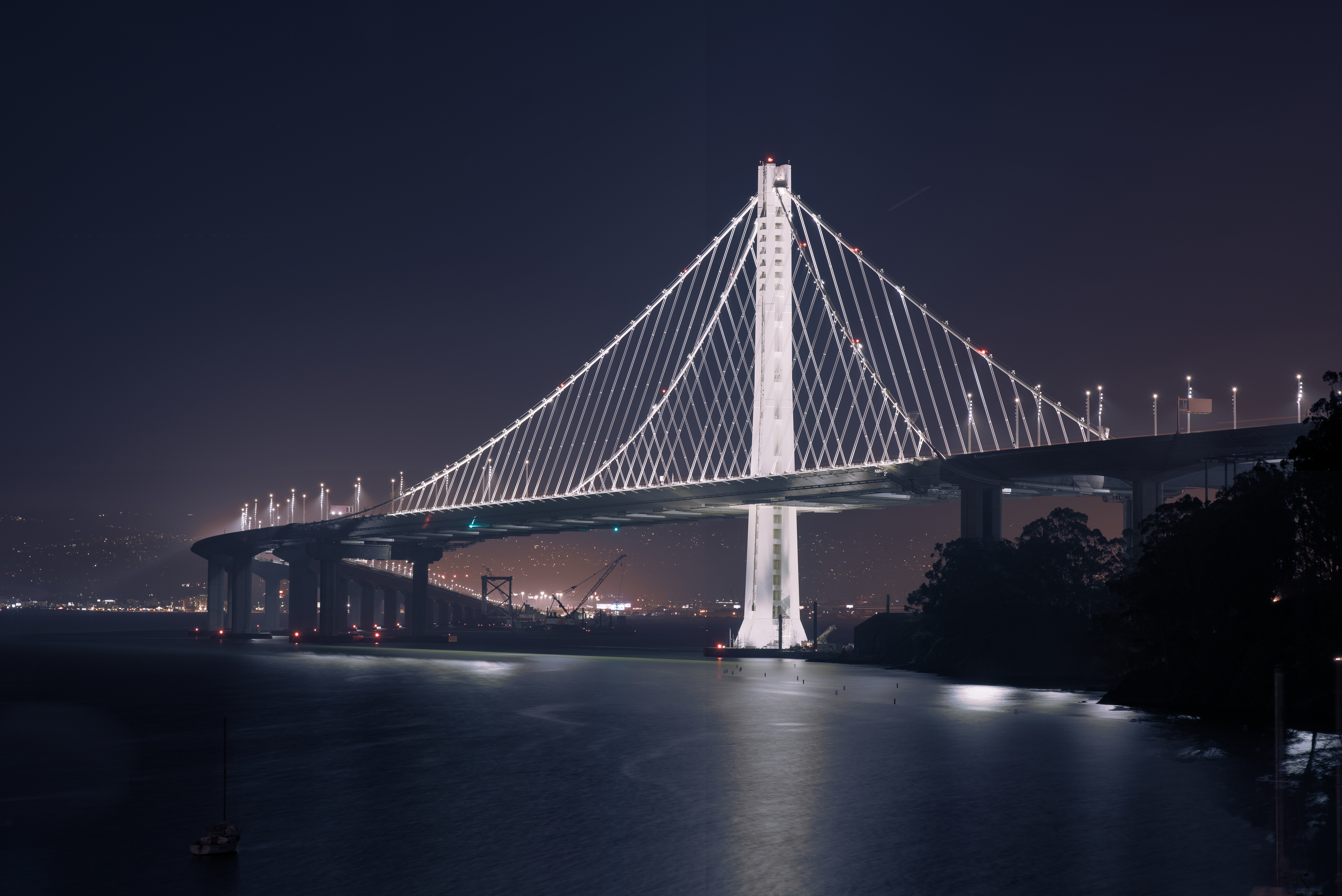
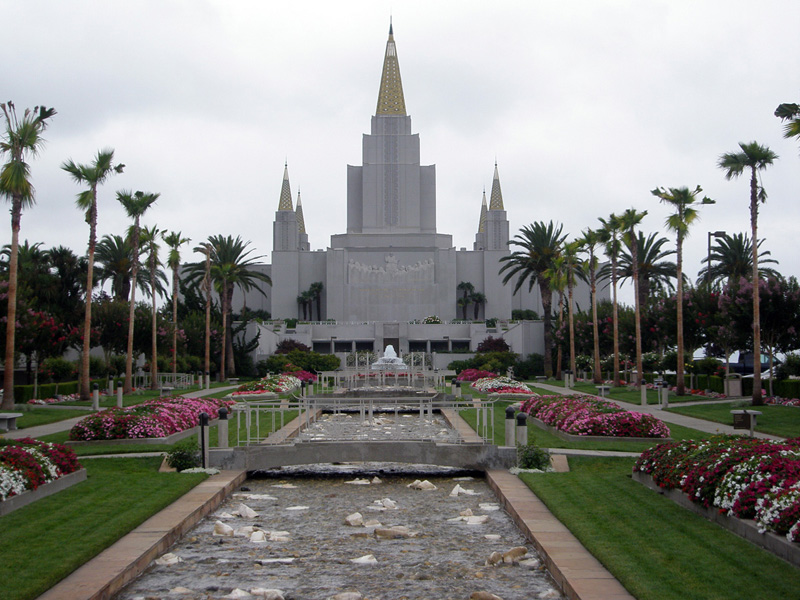
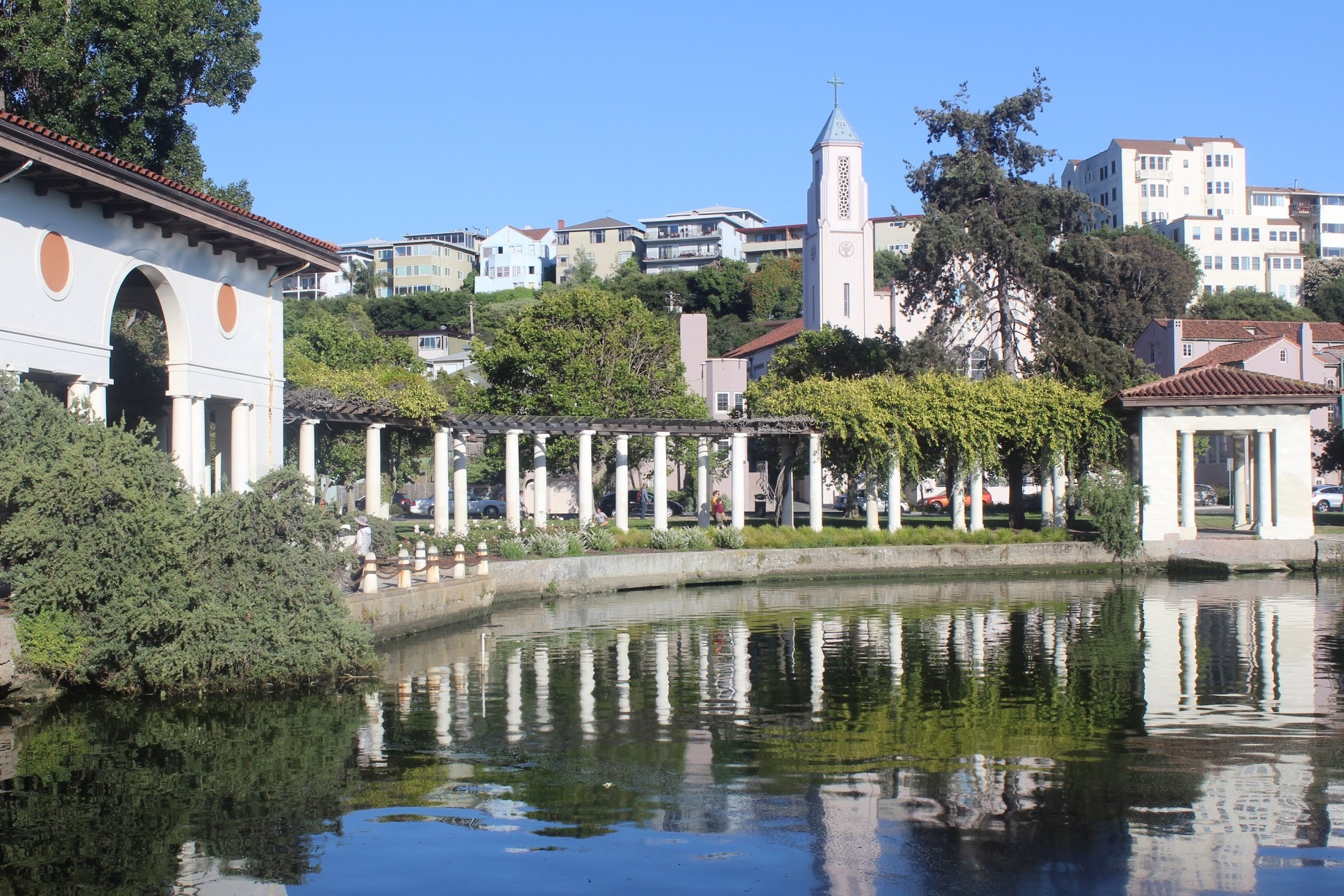
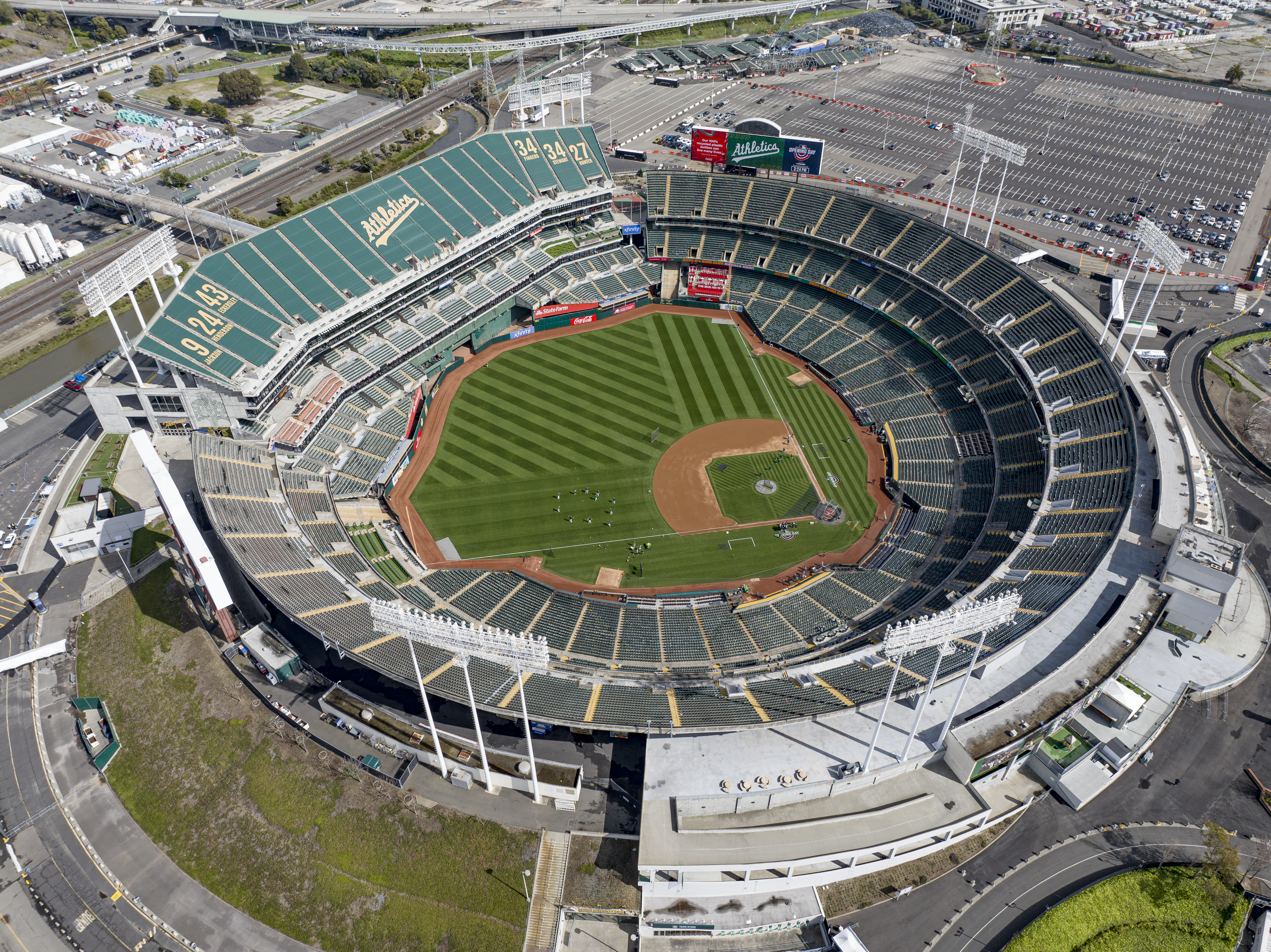
- Aerial of Downtown Oakland, with Lake Merritt in the background Davidson Courthouse Fox Oakland Theatre Tribune Tower Eastern span of the Bay Bridge Oakland Temple Lake Merritt Oakland Coliseum

- Flag Seal Logo
- Nicknames: "Oaktown", "The Town"
- Motto: "Love life"
- Interactive map outlining Oakland
- Location within California Location within the United States
- Coordinates: 37°48′16″N 122°16′15″W
- Country: United States
- State: California
- County: Alameda
- Incorporated: May 4, 1852 (174 years ago)
- Named for: The large oak forest that originally covered the area

Government
  - Type: Strong mayor
  - Body: Oakland City Council
  - Mayor: Barbara Lee (D)

Area
  - Total: 78.03 sq mi (202.10 km^{2})
  - Land: 55.93 sq mi (144.86 km^{2})
  - Water: 22.10 sq mi (57.24 km^{2}) 28.48%
- Elevation: 43 ft (13 m)

Population (2020)
  - Total: 440,646
  - Estimate (2025): 440,838 ▲
  - Rank: 1st in Alameda County; 8th in California; 45th in the United States
  - Density: 7,878.4/sq mi (3,041.87/km^{2})
- Demonym: Oaklander
- Time zone: UTC−08:00 (PST)
  - Summer (DST): UTC−07:00 (PDT)
- ZIP Codes: 94601–94615, 94617-94624, 94649, 94659–94662, 94666
- Area codes: 510/341
- FIPS code: 06-53000
- GNIS feature IDs: 277566, 2411292
- Website: oaklandca.gov

Oakland is a city in the East Bay region of the San Francisco Bay Area in the U.S. state of California. It is the county seat of and the most populous city in Alameda County, California, with a population of 440,646 in 2020. A major West Coast port, Oakland is the most populous city in the East Bay, the third most populous city in the Bay Area, and the eighth most populous city in California. It serves as the Bay Area's trade center: the Port of Oakland is the busiest port in Northern California, and the fifth- or sixth-busiest in the United States. Oakland also serves as a hub for the Bay Area Rapid Transit (BART) system. A charter city, Oakland was incorporated on May 4, 1852, in the wake of the state's increasing population due to the California gold rush.

Oakland's territory covers what was once a mosaic of California coastal terrace prairie, oak woodland, and north coastal scrub. In the late 18th century, it became part of a large rancho grant in the colony of New Spain, and was known for its plentiful oak tree stands. Its land served as a resource when its hillside oak and redwood timber were logged to build San Francisco. The fertile flatland soils helped it become a prolific agricultural region. In the 1850s, what became the first campus of the University of California was founded in Oakland, and Oakland was selected as the western terminal of the Transcontinental Railroad in 1869. The following year, Oakland's Lake Merritt became the United States' first officially designated wildlife refuge, now a National Historic Landmark. Following the catastrophic 1906 San Francisco earthquake, many San Francisco citizens moved to Oakland, enlarging the population, increasing its housing stock, and improving its infrastructure. It continued to grow in the 20th century with its port, shipyards, and manufacturing industry. In 1936, Oakland was connected to San Francisco across the Bay by the Bay Bridge. In the 21st century, between 2019 and 2023, after the city and county refused requests for hundreds of millions of dollars in benefits to the privately owned teams, Oakland lost three teams of the major North American sports leagues within a span of five years.

== History ==
=== Ohlone era ===
The earliest known inhabitants of the area were the Huchiun natives, who lived there for thousands of years. The Huchiun belonged to a linguistic grouping later called the Ohlone (a Miwok word meaning "western people"). In Oakland, they were concentrated around Lake Merritt and Temescal Creek, a stream that enters the San Francisco Bay at Emeryville.

=== Spanish and Mexican era ===
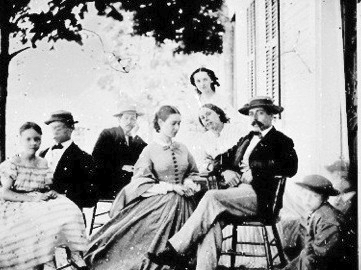
Oakland and much of the East Bay was part of Rancho San Antonio, granted to Luís María Peralta in 1820. Here the Peralta family is pictured at their hacienda in Oakland, c. 1840.

In 1772, the area that later became Oakland was colonized, along with the rest of California, by Spanish settlers for the king of Spain. In the early 19th century, the Spanish crown granted the East Bay area to Luis María Peralta for his Rancho San Antonio. The grant was confirmed by the successor Mexican republic upon its independence from Spain. Upon his death in 1842, Peralta divided his land among his four sons. Most of Oakland was within the shares given to Antonio Maria and Vicente. The portion of the parcel that is now Oakland was called Encinar (misrendered at an early date and carried forward as "encinal") – Spanish for "oak grove" – due to the large oak forest that covered the area, which eventually led to the city's name.

According to Stanford University historian Albert Camarillo, the Peralta family struggled to keep their land after the incorporation of California into the United States after the Mexican–American War. Camarillo claims the family was the victim of targeted racial violence. He writes in Chicanos in California, "They lost everything when squatters cut down their fruit trees, killed their cattle, destroyed their buildings, and even fenced off the roads leading to the rancho. Especially insidious were the actions of attorney Horace Carpentier, who tricked Vicente Peralta into signing a 'lease' which turned out to be a mortgage against the 19,000-acre rancho. The lands became Carpentier's when Peralta refused to repay the loan he believed was fraudulently incurred. The Peraltas had no choice but to abandon the homesite they had occupied for two generations."

=== City beginnings ===
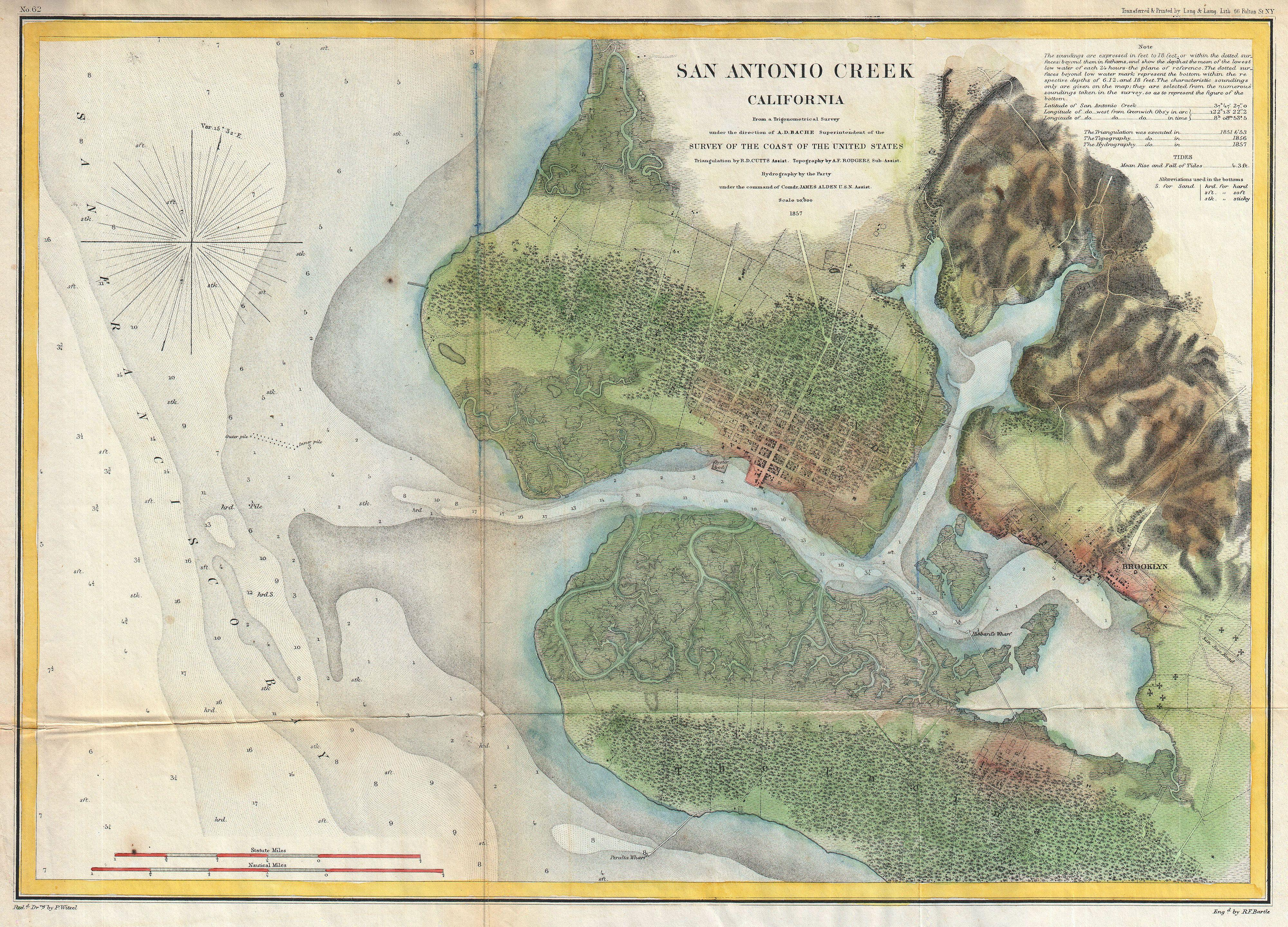
1857 map of Oakland

In 1851, three men—Horace Carpentier, Edson Adams, and Andrew Moon—began developing what is now downtown Oakland. In 1852, the Town of Oakland was incorporated by the state legislature. During this time, Oakland had 75–100 inhabitants, two hotels, a wharf, two warehouses, and only cattle trails. Two years later, on March 25, 1854, Oakland re-incorporated as the City of Oakland. Horace Carpentier was elected the first mayor, though a scandal ended his mayorship in less than a year. In 1853, a preparatory academy was founded in Oakland that soon became the College of California, and in 1869, the first campus of the University of California. The university moved just north to Berkeley in the 1870s.

During the 1850s, just as gold was discovered in California, Oakland started growing and further developing because land was becoming too expensive in San Francisco. People in China were struggling financially as a result of the First Opium War, the Second Opium War, and the Taiping Rebellion, so they began migrating to Oakland, and many were recruited to work on railroads. However, the Chinese struggled to settle because they were discriminated against by the white community and their living quarters were burned down on several occasions.

The city and its environs quickly grew with the railroads, becoming a major rail terminal in the late 1860s and 1870s. In 1868, the Central Pacific constructed the Oakland Long Wharf at Oakland Point, the site of today's Port of Oakland.

A number of horsecar and cable car lines were constructed in Oakland during the latter half of the 19th century. The first electric streetcar set out from Oakland to Berkeley in 1891, and other lines were converted and added over the course of the 1890s. The various streetcar companies operating in Oakland were acquired by Francis "Borax" Smith and consolidated into what eventually became known as the Key System, the predecessor of today's publicly owned AC Transit.

=== 1900–1950s ===
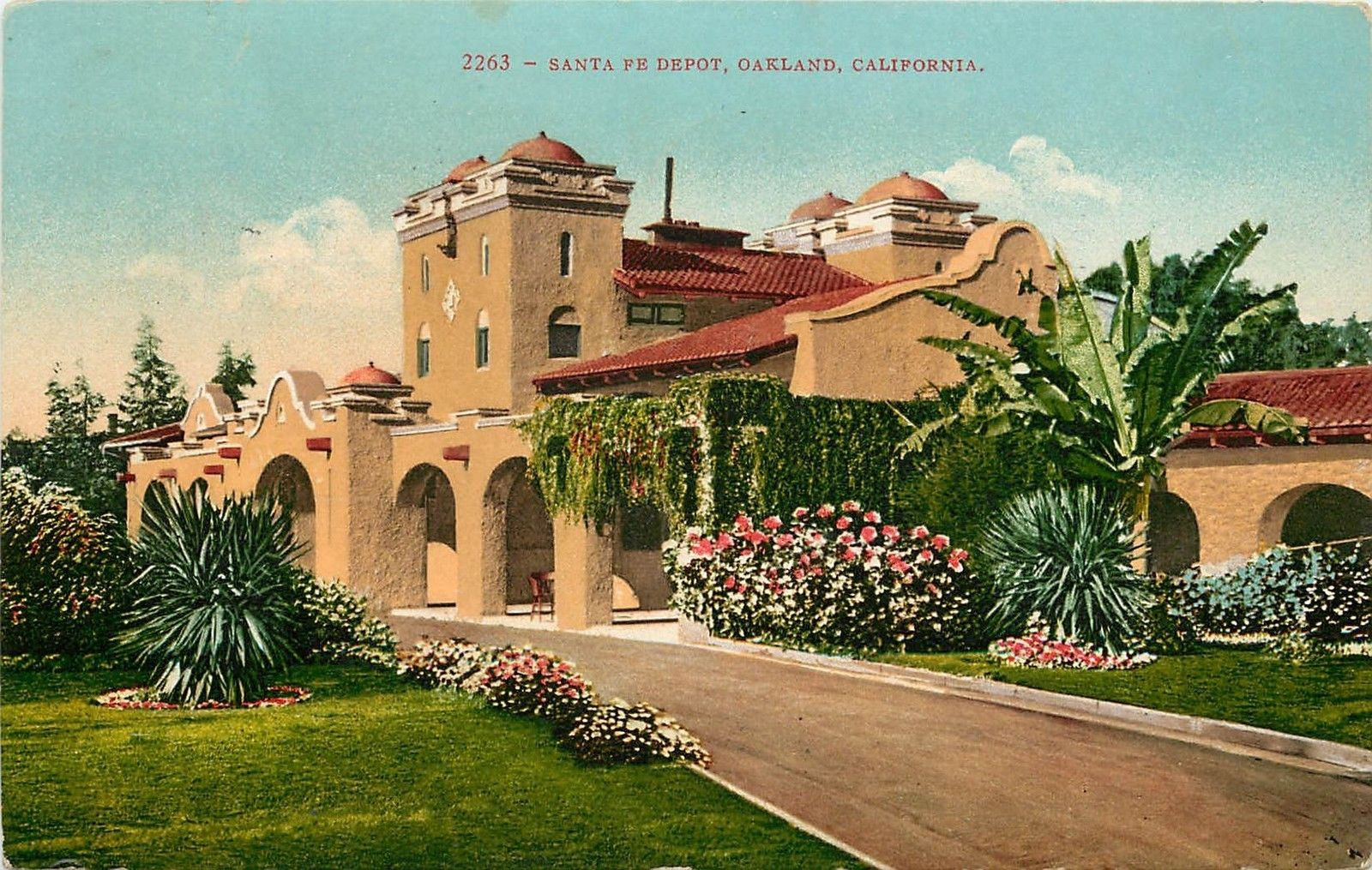
The Santa Fe rail station in 1912.

Oakland was one of the cities in California most impacted by the San Francisco plague of 1900–1904. Quarantine measures were set in place at the Oakland ports requiring the authorities at the port to inspect the arriving vessels for the presence of infected rats. Quarantine authorities at these ports inspected over a thousand vessels per year for plague and yellow fever. By 1908, over 5,000 people were detained in quarantine. Hunters were sent to poison the affected areas in Oakland and shoot the squirrels, but the eradication work was limited in its range because the State Board of Health and the United States Public Health Service were only allotted about $60,000 a year to eradicate the disease. During this period Oakland did not have sufficient health facilities, so some of the infected patients were treated at home.

The State Board of Health along with Oakland also advised physicians to promptly report any cases of infected patients. Yet, in 1919 it still resulted in a small epidemic of Pneumonic plague which killed a dozen people in Oakland. This started when a man went hunting in Contra Costa Valley and killed a squirrel. After eating the squirrel, he fell ill four days later and another household member contracted the plague. This in turn was passed on either directly or indirectly to about a dozen others. The officials in Oakland acted quickly by issuing death certificates to monitor the spread of plague.

==== Incorporation ====
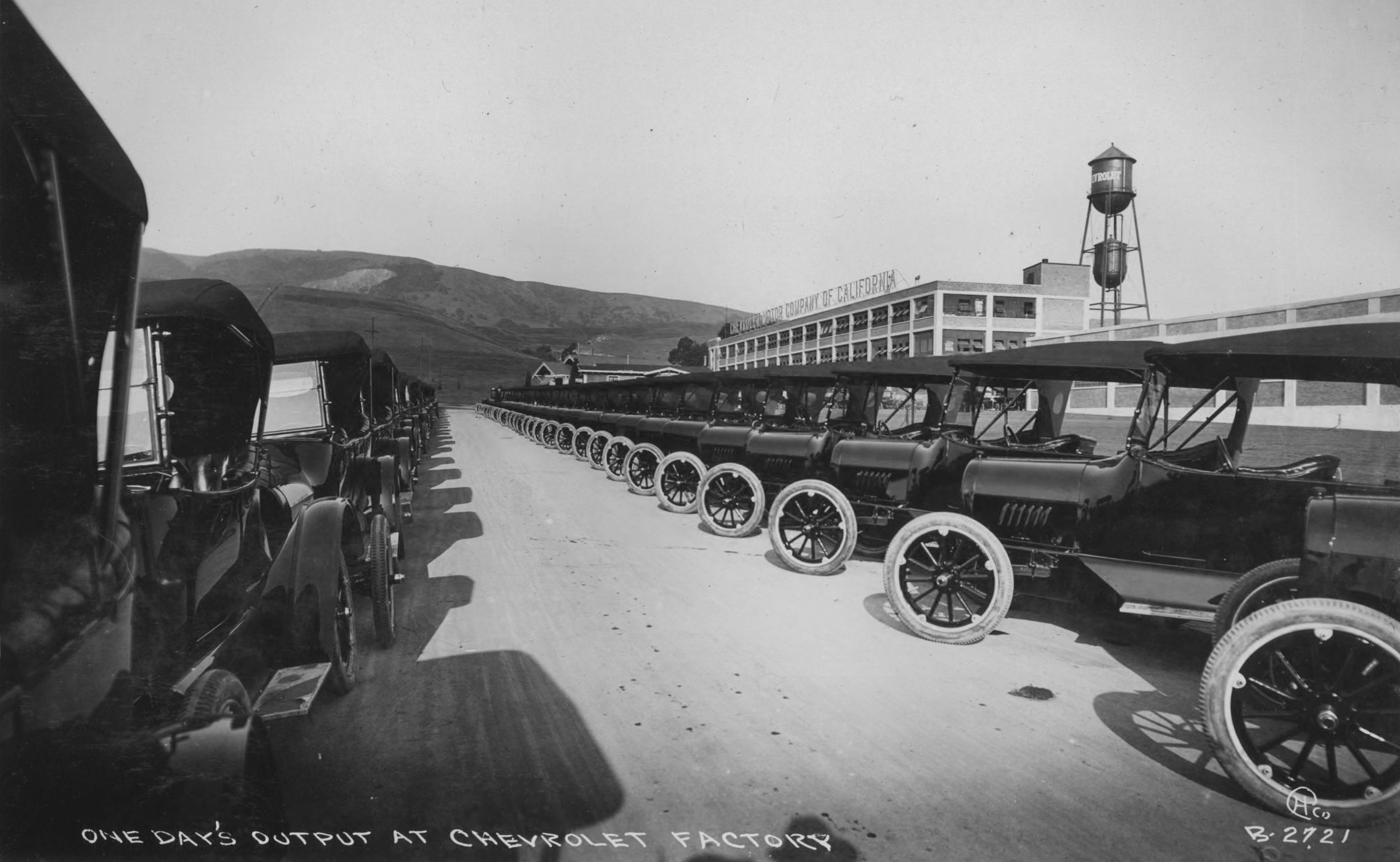
One day's output of 1917 automobiles at Chevrolet's major West Coast plant, now the location of Eastmont Town Center

At the time of incorporation in 1852, Oakland had consisted of the territory that lay south of today's major intersection of San Pablo Avenue, Broadway, and Fourteenth Street. The city gradually annexed farmlands and settlements to the east and the north. Oakland's rise to industrial prominence, and its subsequent need for a seaport, led to the digging of a shipping and tidal channel in 1902. This resulted in the nearby town of Alameda being made an island. In 1906, the city's population doubled with refugees made homeless after the 1906 San Francisco earthquake and fire.

In 1908, the lawyer, former miner, and newspaper owner Homer Wood (1880–1976) suggested to his friend Frank Bilger of Blake and Bilger Rock Quarry and Paving Company that he organize a gathering to establish a Rotary Club east of the bay. On November 27, 1908, Homer took a ferry across the bay in a driving rainstorm and met for lunch with Frank and twenty three other businessmen at the Hotel Metropole at 13th and Jefferson. This gathering became the first meeting of the Tri-City Rotary Club, renamed in 1911 The Rotary Club of Oakland, the third Rotary Club in the world. This group established the tradition of weekly meetings, something most clubs worldwide follow today.

In 1917, General Motors opened an automobile factory in East Oakland called Oakland Assembly. It produced Chevrolet cars and then GMC trucks until 1963, when it was moved to Fremont in southern Alameda County. Also in 1916, the Fageol Motor Company chose East Oakland for their first factory, manufacturing farming tractors from 1918 to 1923. By 1920, Oakland was the home of numerous manufacturing industries, including metals, canneries, bakeries, internal combustion engines, automobiles, and shipbuilding. By 1929, when Chrysler expanded with a new plant there, Oakland had become known as the "Detroit of the West," referring to the major auto manufacturing center in Michigan.

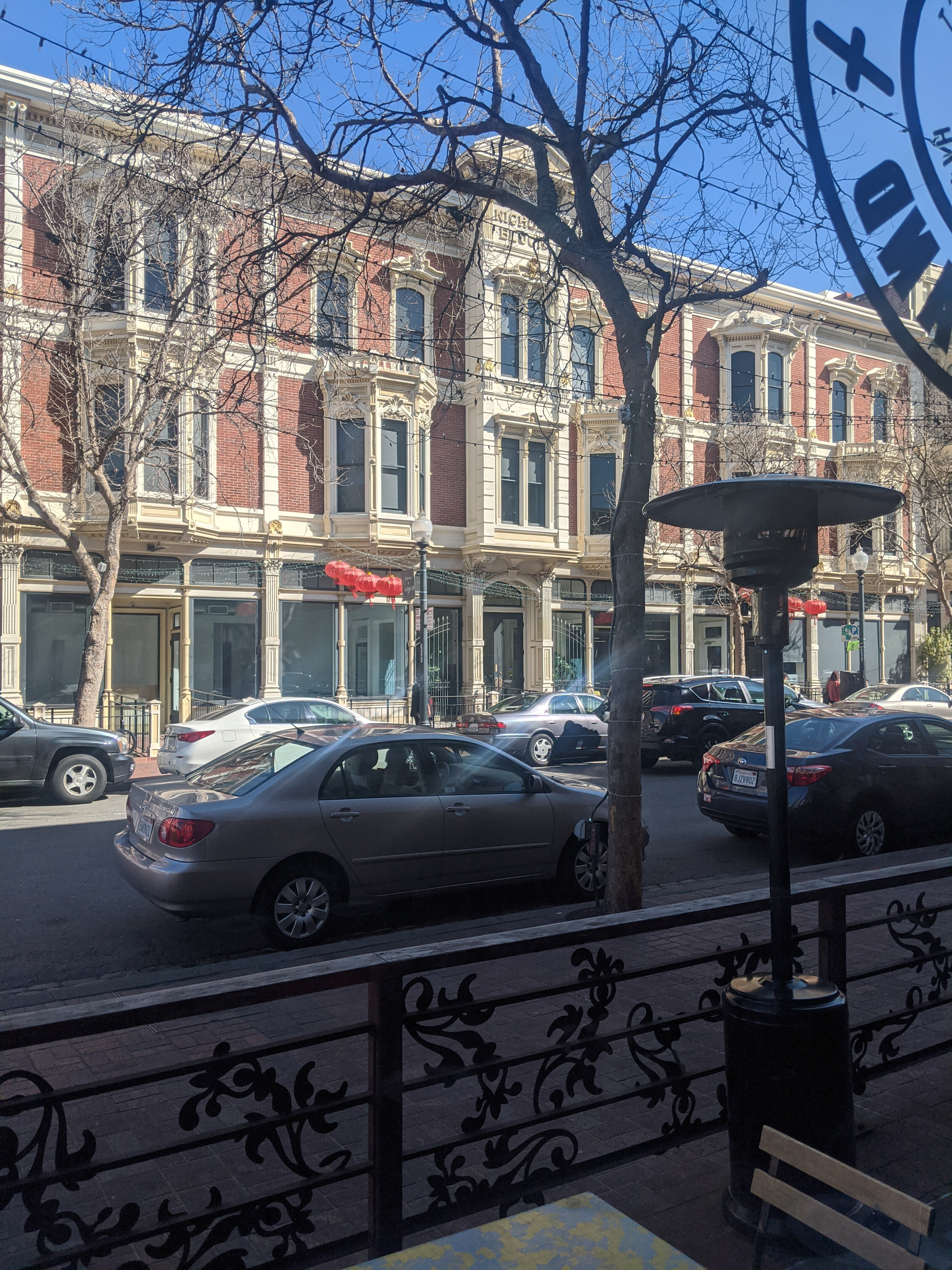
Old Oakland neighborhood

Oakland expanded during the 1920s, as its population expanded with factory workers. Approximately 13,000 homes were built in the 3 years between 1921 and 1924, more than during the 13 years between 1907 and 1920. Many of the large downtown office buildings, apartment buildings, and single-family houses still standing in Oakland were built during the 1920s; they reflect the architectural styles of the time.

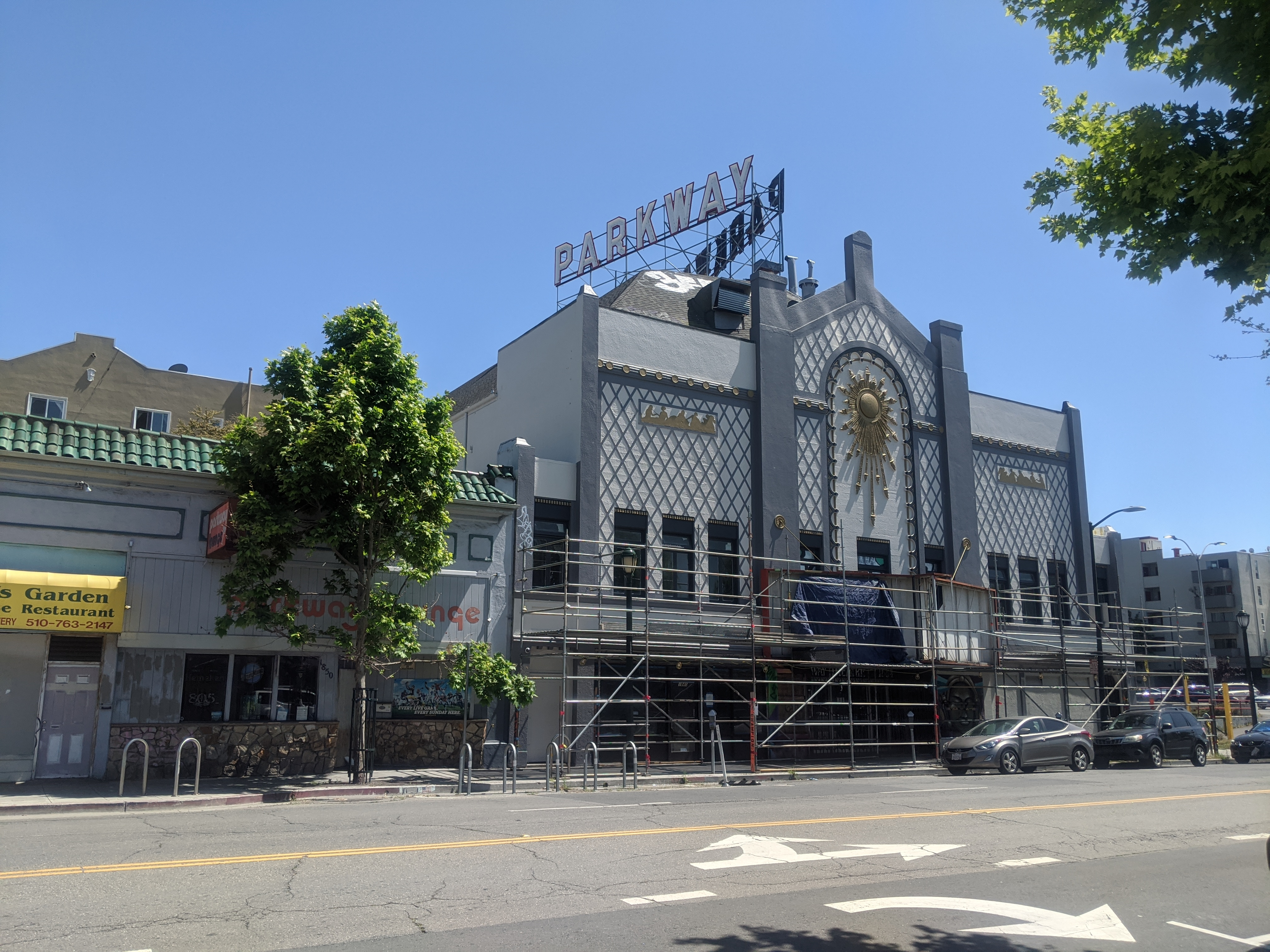
Historic 1920s-era Parkway Theater

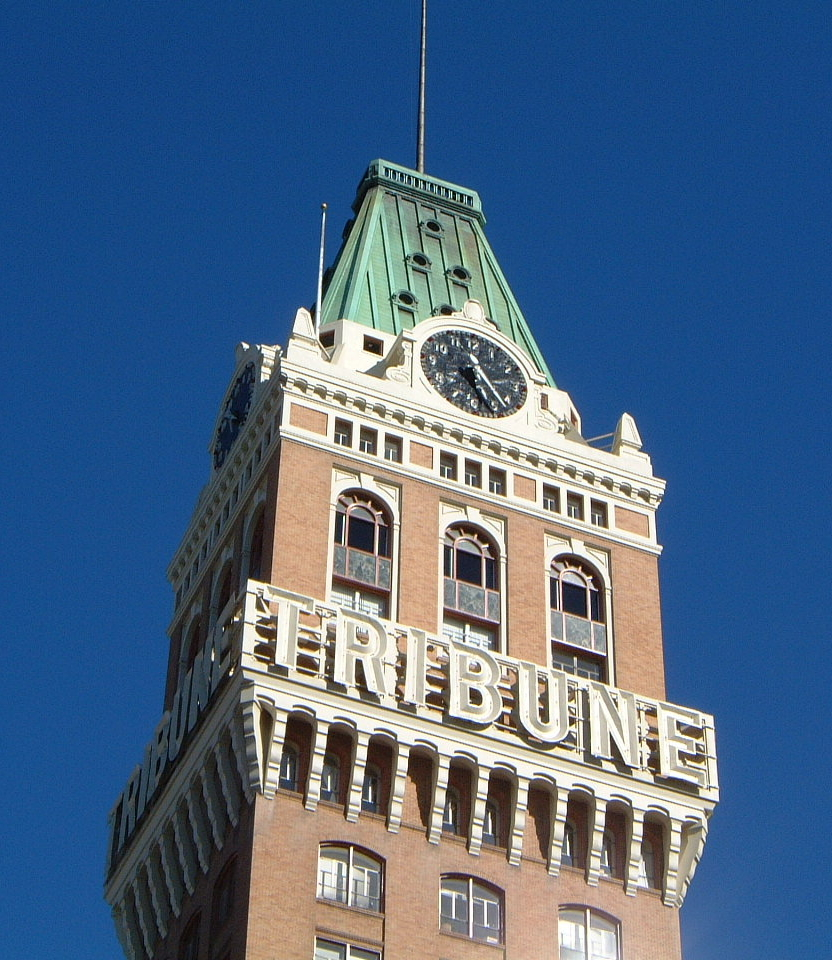
In 1924, the Tribune Tower was completed; in 1976, it was restored and declared an Oakland landmark. While it is no longer occupied by the Oakland Tribune, its historic appearance is preserved.

Russell Clifford Durant established Durant Field at 82nd Avenue and East 14th Street in 1916. The first transcontinental airmail flight finished its journey at Durant Field on August 9, 1920, flown by Army Capt. Eddie Rickenbacker and Navy Lt. Bert Acosta. Durant Field was often called Oakland Airport, though the current Oakland San Francisco Bay Airport was soon established four miles (6.4 km) to the southwest.

During World War II, the East Bay Area was home to many war-related industries. Oakland's Moore Dry Dock Company expanded its shipbuilding capabilities and built over 100 ships. Valued at $100 million in 1943, Oakland's canning industry was its second-most-valuable war contribution after shipbuilding. The largest canneries were in the Fruitvale District, and included the Josiah Lusk Canning Company, the Oakland Preserving Company (which started the Del Monte brand), and the California Packing Company.

President Franklin D. Roosevelt called on defense industries with government contracts to integrate their workforces and provide opportunities for all Americans. Tens of thousands of laborers came from around the country, especially poor whites and blacks from the Deep South: Alabama, Arkansas, Georgia, Louisiana, Mississippi, South Carolina, and Texas, as well as Missouri and Tennessee. Henry J. Kaiser's representatives recruited sharecroppers and tenant farmers from rural areas to work in his shipyards. African Americans were part of the Great Migration by which five million persons left the South, mostly for the West, from 1940 to 1970. White migrants from the Jim Crow South carried their racial attitudes, causing tensions to rise among black and white workers competing for better-paying jobs in the Bay Area. The racial harmony Oakland African-Americans had been accustomed to prior to the war evaporated. Also migrating to the area during this time were many Mexican Americans from southwestern states such as New Mexico, Texas, and Colorado. Many worked for the Southern Pacific Railroad, at its major rail yard in West Oakland. Their young men encountered hostility and discrimination by Armed Forces personnel, and tensions broke out in "zoot suit riots" in downtown Oakland in 1943 in the wake of a major disturbance in Los Angeles that year.

View of Lake Merritt looking southwest toward the Alameda County Courthouse

In 1946, National City Lines (NCL), a General Motors holding company, acquired 64% of Key System stock; during the next several years NCL engaged in the conspiratorial dissolution of Oakland's electric streetcar system. The city's expensive electric streetcar fleet was converted to cheaper diesel buses. The state Legislature created the Alameda and Contra Costa Transit District in 1955, which operates today as AC Transit, the third-largest bus-only transit system in the nation.

After the war, as Oakland's shipbuilding industry declined and the automobile industry went through restructuring, many jobs were lost. In addition, labor unrest increased as workers struggled to protect their livelihoods. Oakland was the center of a general strike during the first week of December 1946, one of six cities across the country that had such a strike after World War II.

The Mary's First and Last Chance in Oakland was a lesbian bar, once the focus of the 1950s Supreme Court of California lawsuit Vallerga v. Dept. Alcoholic Bev. Control, when the bar challenged a state law for the right to serve gay patrons and won in 1959.

=== 1960–1999 ===
In 1960, Kaiser Corporation opened its new headquarters; it was the largest skyscraper in Oakland, as well as "the largest office tower west of Chicago" up to that time. In the postwar period, suburban development increased around Oakland, and wealthier residents moved to new housing. Despite the major increases in the number and proportion of African Americans in the city, in 1966 only 16 of the city's 661 police officers were black. Tensions between the Black community and the largely white police force were high, as expectations during the civil rights era increased to gain social justice and equality before the law. Police abuse of Black people was common.

Students Huey Newton and Bobby Seale founded the Black Panther Party at Merritt College (then located at a former high school on Grove Street, now occupied by Children's Hospital Oakland Research Institute), which emphasized Black nationalism, advocated armed self-defense against police, and was involved in several incidents that ended in the deaths of police officers and other Black Panther members. Among their social programs were feeding children and providing other services to the needy.

As in many other American cities during the 1980s, crack cocaine became a serious problem in Oakland. Drug dealing in general, and the dealing of crack cocaine in particular, resulted in elevated rates of violent crime, causing Oakland to consistently be listed as one of America's most crime-ridden cities.

In 1980, Oakland's Black population reached its 20th-century peak at approximately 47% of the overall city population but has declined since then to 20.2% with white people now outnumbering Black people at 29.6% white.

The 6.9 M_{w} Loma Prieta earthquake occurred on October 17, 1989. The rupture was related to the San Andreas fault system and affected the entire San Francisco Bay Area with a maximum Mercalli intensity of IX (Violent). Many structures in Oakland were badly damaged including the double-decker portion of Interstate 880 that collapsed. The eastern span of the San Francisco–Oakland Bay Bridge also sustained damage and was closed to traffic for one month.

On October 20, 1991, a massive firestorm swept down from the Berkeley/Oakland hills above the Caldecott Tunnel. Twenty-five people were killed, 150 people were injured, and nearly 4,000 homes destroyed. With the loss of life and an estimated economic loss of US$1.5 billion, this was the worst urban firestorm in American history, until 2017.

During the mid-1990s, Oakland's economy began to recover as it transitioned to new types of jobs. In addition, the city participated in large development and urban renewal projects, concentrated especially in the downtown area, at the Port of Oakland, and at the Oakland San Francisco Bay Airport.

=== 21st century ===
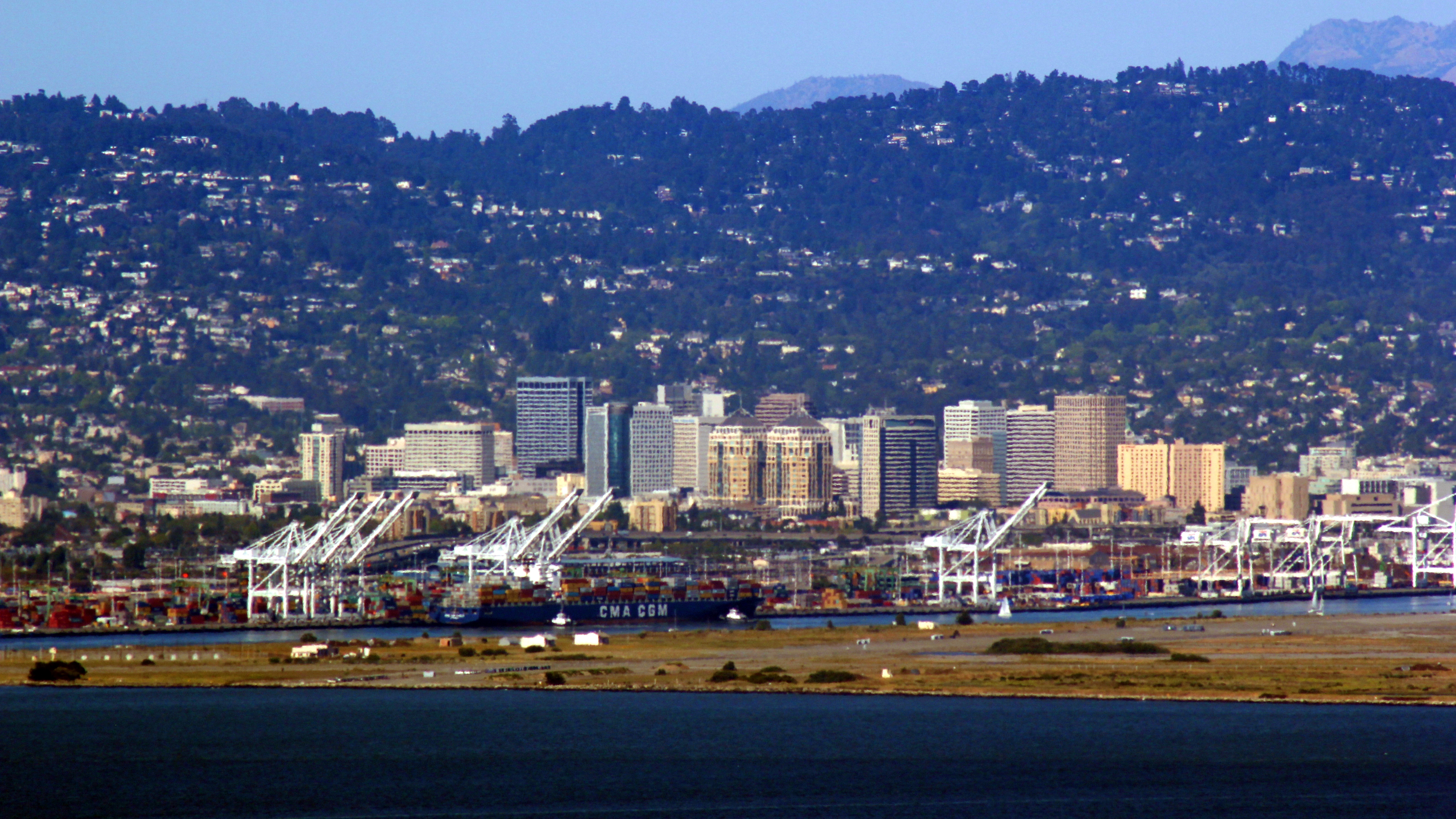
Port of Oakland and downtown, with the Oakland and Berkeley Hills in the background

After his 1999 inauguration, Oakland Mayor Jerry Brown continued his predecessor Elihu Harris' public policy of supporting downtown housing development in the area defined as the Central Business District in Oakland's 1998 General Plan. Brown's plan and other redevelopment projects were controversial due to potential rent increases and gentrification, which would displace lower-income residents from downtown Oakland into outlying neighborhoods and cities.

Due to allegations of misconduct by the Oakland Police Department, the City of Oakland paid claims for a total of US$57 million during the 2001–2011 timeframe to plaintiffs claiming police abuse; this is the largest sum paid by any city in California. On October 10, 2011, protesters and civic activists began "Occupy Oakland" demonstrations at Frank Ogawa Plaza in Downtown Oakland.

African-Americans dropped to 28% of Oakland's population in 2010 from nearly half in 1980, due to fast-rising rents and an extreme housing crisis in the region.

The city inspected warehouses and live/work spaces after a fire broke out in the Ghost Ship warehouse, killing 36 people in 2016.

Oakland is the second U.S. city, after Denver, to decriminalize psilocybin mushrooms. In June 2019, the City Council passed the resolution in a unanimous vote ending the investigation and imposition of criminal penalties for use and possession of natural entheogens.

In November 2019, two homeless mothers and their children illegally occupied a vacant three-bedroom house in West Oakland. The group, calling themselves Moms 4 Housing, said their goal was to protest what they said was a large number of vacant houses in Oakland owned by redevelopment companies while the city experienced a housing crisis. Two months later, they were evicted from the house by three dozen sheriff's deputies, as hundreds of supporters demonstrated in favor of the women. The incident received nationwide coverage. The company that owned the house later said they would sell it to a nonprofit affordable housing group. As of 2019, Oakland's per-capita homeless rate was higher than San Francisco and Berkeley. Between 2014 and 2020, Oakland strengthened its protections for tenants in order to reduce the displacement of its long-time residents. However, since 2019, the city of Oakland has reduced the number of approved housing permits by more than 80%, further worsening the housing shortage in Oakland.

Between January 2020 and March 2022, Oakland suffered a disproportionate death toll from the COVID-19 pandemic and Delta cron hybrid variant within the San Francisco Bay Area.

In 2023, Oakland became the first city in American history to lose three professional major league sports teams to other cities within a span of five years. While the Golden State Warriors stayed in the Bay Area and went to San Francisco, both the Raiders and the A's relocated to Las Vegas.

In 2025 Oakland recorded its lowest homicide rate since 1967 with only 67 homicides in a massive recovery from its earlier era and has seen a boom in population recently.

== Geography ==
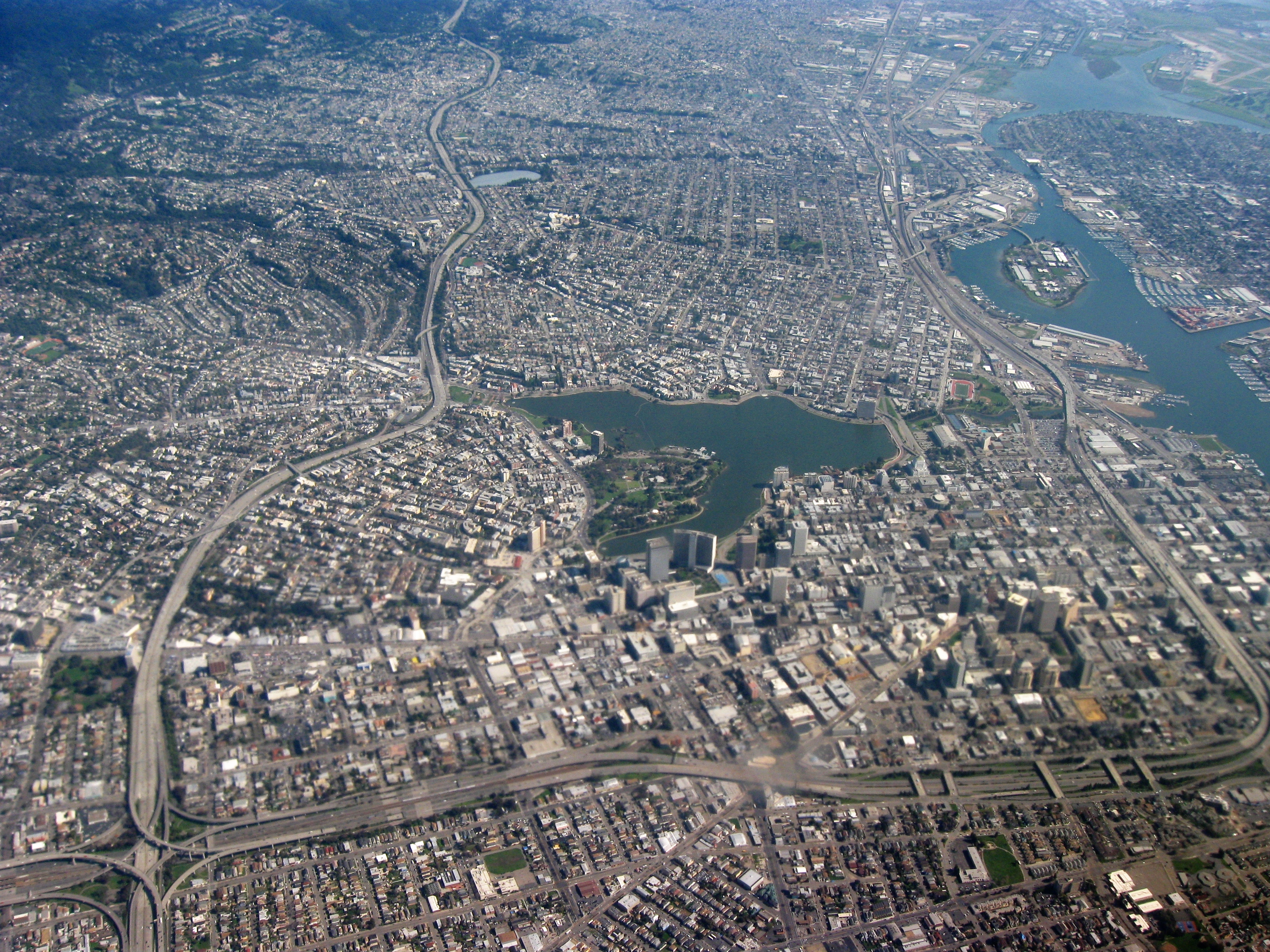
Aerial view of Downtown

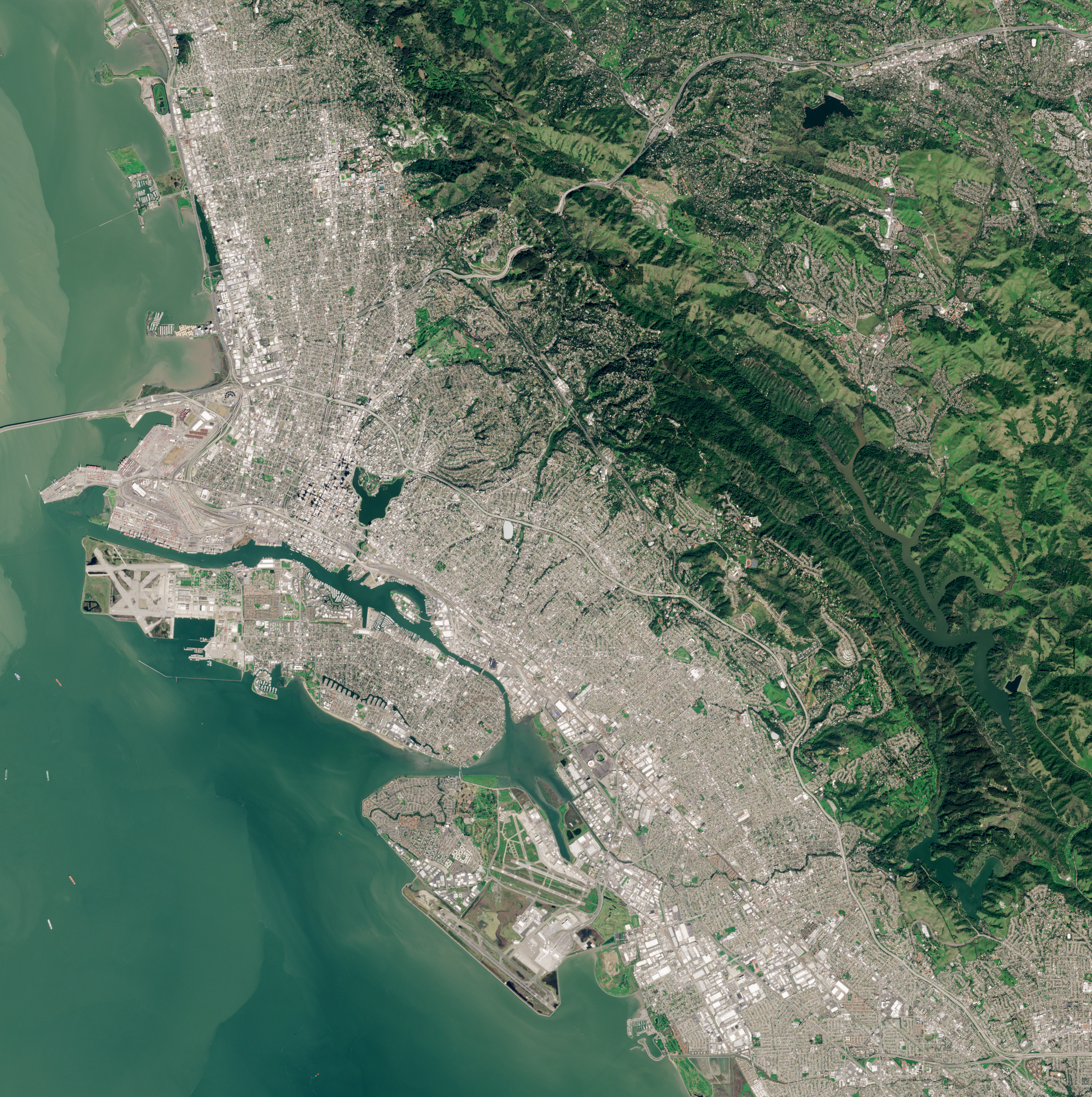
Satellite picture of the Oakland area in 2019

Oakland is in the eastern region of the San Francisco Bay.

The United States Census Bureau says the city's total area is 78.0 square miles (202 km^{2}), including 55.8 square miles (145 km^{2}) of land and 22.2 square miles (57 km^{2}) (28.48 percent) of water.

Oakland's highest point is near Grizzly Peak Blvd, east of Berkeley, just over 1,760 feet (540 m) above sea level at about 37.8786°N 122.2241°W. Oakland has 19 miles (31 km) of shoreline, but Radio Beach is the only beach in Oakland.

Oaklanders refer to their city's terrain as "the flatlands" and "the hills". Until recent waves of gentrification, these terms also symbolized Oakland's deep economic divide, with "the hills" being more affluent communities. About two-thirds of Oakland lies in the flat plain of the East Bay, with one-third rising into the foothills and hills of the East Bay range.

Ruptures along the nearby San Andreas Fault caused severe earth movement in the San Francisco Bay Area in 1906 and 1989. San Andreas quakes induces creep (movement occurring on earthquake faults) in the Hayward fault, which runs directly through Oakland, Berkeley, San Jose and other Bay Area cities.

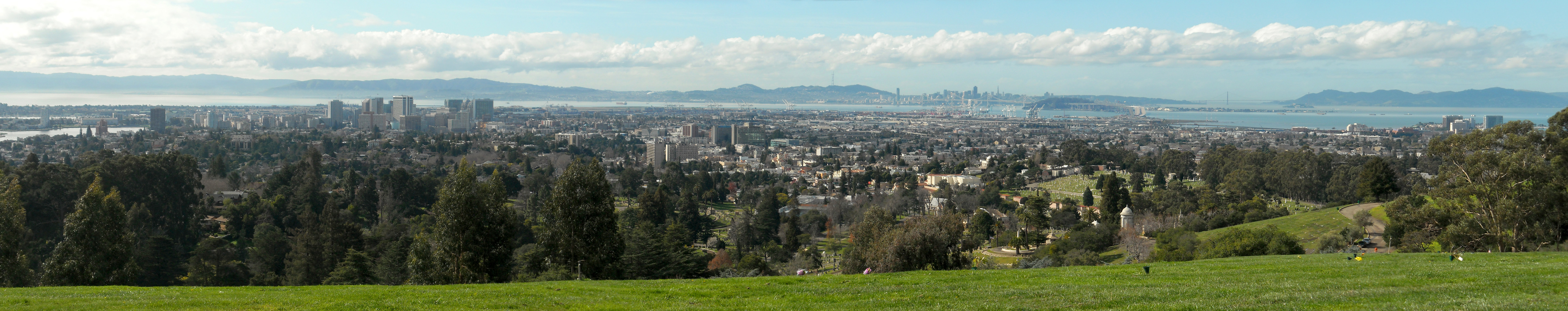
Panorama of Oakland, California, from the top of Mountain View Cemetery

=== Neighborhoods ===
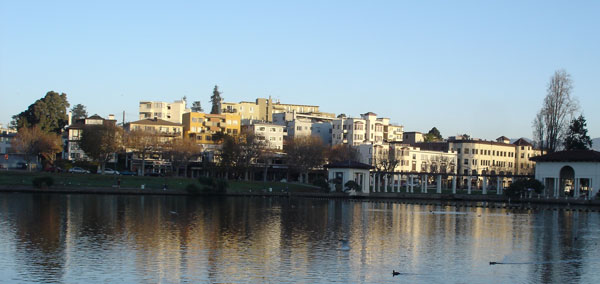
The north end of the Adams Point district, as seen from Lakeshore Avenue on the east shore of the lake

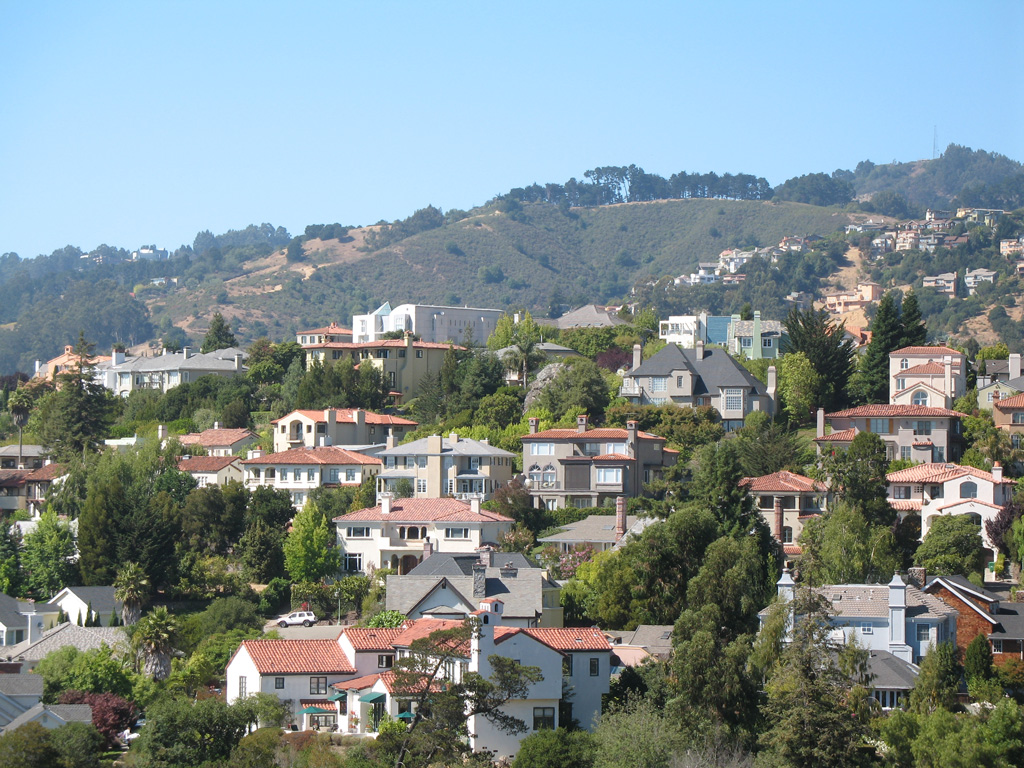
Upper Rockridge

Oakland has more than 50 distinct neighborhoods. The city's greater divisions include downtown Oakland and its greater Central Business District, Lake Merritt, East Oakland, North Oakland, West Oakland, and the Oakland Hills. East Oakland, which includes the East Oakland Hills, encompasses more than half of Oakland's land area, stretching from Lakeshore Avenue on the east shore of Lake Merritt southeast to the San Leandro border. North Oakland encompasses the neighborhoods between downtown and Berkeley and Emeryville. West Oakland is the area between downtown and the Bay, partially surrounded by the Oakland Point, and encompassing the Port of Oakland. In 2011, Oakland was ranked the tenth most walkable city in the United States by Walk Score.

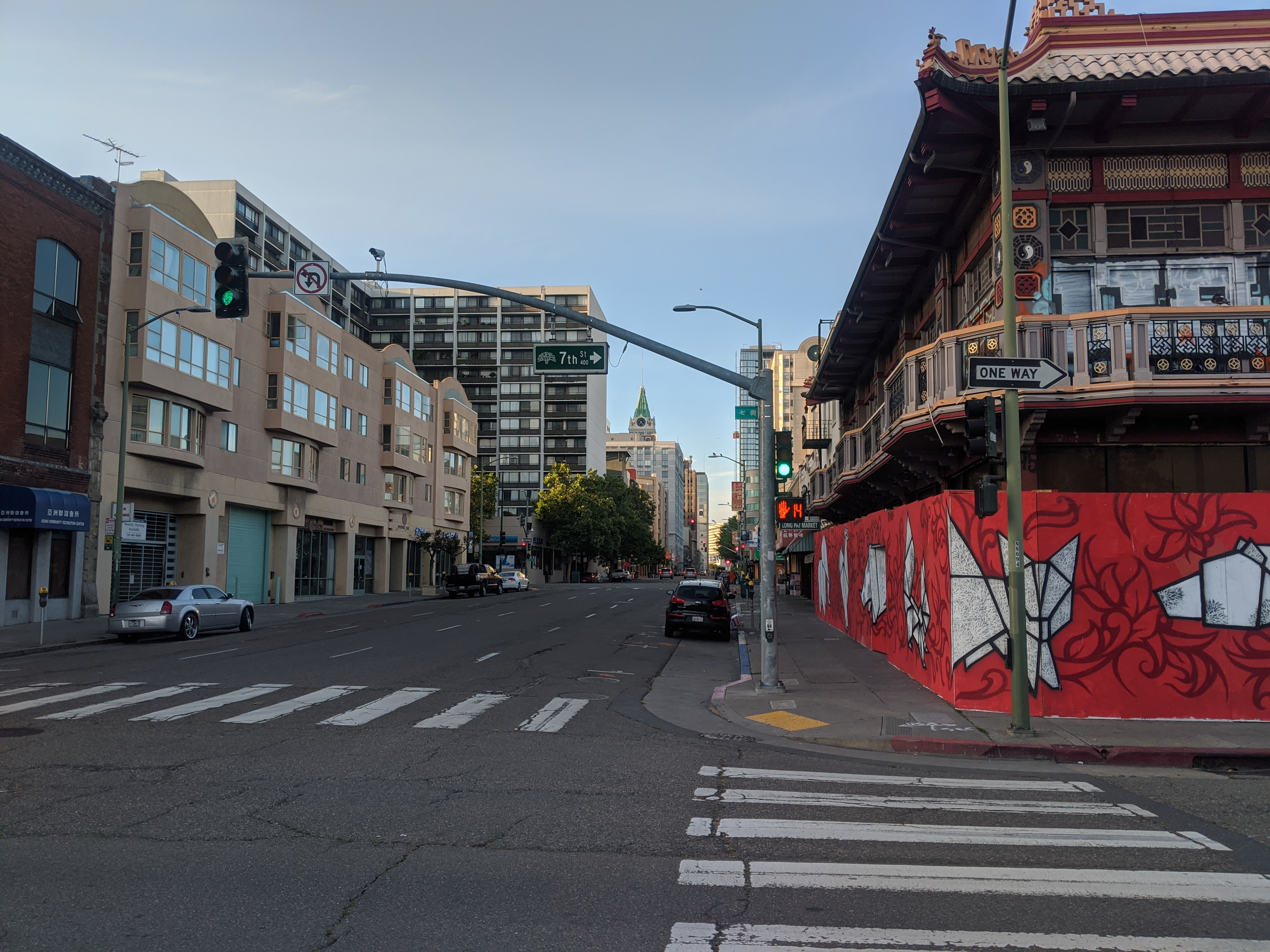
Oakland's Chinatown district is one of the oldest in the nation.

Lake Merritt, an urban estuary near downtown, is a mix of fresh and salt water draining in and out from the Oakland Harbor at the San Francisco Bay and one of Oakland's most notable features. It was designated the United States' first official wildlife refuge in 1870. Originally a marsh-lined wildlife haven, Lake Merritt was dredged and bordered with parks from the 1890s to the 1910s. Despite this reduction in habitat, Oakland is home to a number of rare and endangered species, many of which are localized to serpentine soils and bedrock. Lake Merritt is surrounded by residential and business districts, including downtown and Grand Lake.

The city of Piedmont, incorporated in Oakland's central foothills after the 1906 earthquake, is a small independent city surrounded by the city of Oakland.

=== Climate ===
Oakland has a warm-summer Mediterranean climate (Köppen: Csb, Trewartha: Csbl) with an average of 260 sunny days per year. In general, the city features warm, dry summers, and cool, wet winters.

Based on data gathered by the National Oceanic and Atmospheric Administration, Oakland is ranked No. 1 in climate among U.S. cities. Oakland's climate is typified by the temperate and seasonal Mediterranean climate. Summers are usually dry and warm and winters are cool and damp. It has features found in both nearby coastal cities such as San Francisco and inland cities such as San Jose, making it warmer than San Francisco and cooler than San Jose. Its position on San Francisco Bay across from the Bay Bridge means the northern part of the city can have cooling maritime fog. It is far enough inland that the fog often burns off by midday, allowing it to have typically sunny California days. The hills tend to have more fog than the flatlands, as the fog drifts down from Berkeley.

The U.S. Weather Bureau kept weather records in downtown Oakland from October 4, 1894, to July 31, 1958. During that time, the record high temperature was 104 °F (40 °C) on June 24, 1957, and the record low temperature was 24 °F (−4 °C) on January 23, 1949. Dry, warm offshore "Diablo" winds (similar to the Santa Ana winds of Southern California) sometimes occur, especially in fall, and raise the fire danger. In 1991, such an episode allowed the catastrophic Oakland Hills fire to spread and consume many homes.

Climate chart for Oakland

Oakland, like much of Northern California, is susceptible to winter rainstorms and Atmospheric rivers. The wettest "rain year" was from July 1997 to June 1998 with 47.76 inches (1,213.1 mm) and the driest from July 2020 to June 2021 with 8.03 inches (204.0 mm). The most rainfall in one month was 15.35 inches (390 mm) in January 1911. The most rainfall in 24 hours was 4.75 inches (121 mm) on December 31, 2022. Rainfall near the bayfront is only 23 inches (580 mm), but is higher in the Oakland Hills to the east (up to 30 inches [760 mm]), with nearly all precipitation falling between November and April. While measurable amounts of snowfall in Oakland at sea level is very rare, light snow accumulates on the ground the higher elevations of the Oakland hills with more regularity.

Overnight lows are mild. Oakland seldom experiences warm nights with the warmest recorded night of 72 °F (22 °C) in September 1971 and an average of 64 °F (18 °C) for the annual warmest low. The coldest day of the year averages a mild 50 °F (10 °C) and has never been recorded below 36 °F (2 °C).

The National Weather Service today has two official weather stations in Oakland: Oakland San Francisco Bay Airport and the Oakland Museum (established 1970).

Climate data for Oakland, California (1991–2020 normals, extremes 1970–present)
Month	Jan	Feb	Mar	Apr	May	Jun	Jul	Aug	Sep	Oct	Nov	Dec	Year
Record high °F (°C)	78 (26)	82 (28)	88 (31)	97 (36)	105 (41)	106 (41)	103 (39)	100 (38)	109 (43)	103 (39)	84 (29)	75 (24)	109 (43)
Mean maximum °F (°C)	68.6 (20.3)	72.5 (22.5)	76.7 (24.8)	82.2 (27.9)	84.2 (29.0)	88.7 (31.5)	86.0 (30.0)	87.5 (30.8)	90.6 (32.6)	87.7 (30.9)	77.1 (25.1)	68.0 (20.0)	92.6 (33.7)
Mean daily maximum °F (°C)	59.8 (15.4)	62.4 (16.9)	64.7 (18.2)	66.8 (19.3)	68.6 (20.3)	71.8 (22.1)	71.6 (22.0)	72.8 (22.7)	74.6 (23.7)	72.7 (22.6)	65.8 (18.8)	59.7 (15.4)	67.6 (19.8)
Daily mean °F (°C)	52.5 (11.4)	54.7 (12.6)	56.7 (13.7)	58.5 (14.7)	60.8 (16.0)	63.4 (17.4)	64.1 (17.8)	65.2 (18.4)	65.9 (18.8)	63.7 (17.6)	57.6 (14.2)	52.4 (11.3)	59.6 (15.3)
Mean daily minimum °F (°C)	45.1 (7.3)	47.1 (8.4)	48.7 (9.3)	50.3 (10.2)	52.9 (11.6)	55.0 (12.8)	56.6 (13.7)	57.6 (14.2)	57.2 (14.0)	54.6 (12.6)	49.4 (9.7)	45.1 (7.3)	51.6 (10.9)
Mean minimum °F (°C)	37.9 (3.3)	40.2 (4.6)	42.4 (5.8)	45.0 (7.2)	49.4 (9.7)	51.9 (11.1)	54.0 (12.2)	55.6 (13.1)	53.6 (12.0)	49.0 (9.4)	41.7 (5.4)	37.5 (3.1)	36.4 (2.4)
Record low °F (°C)	30 (−1)	29 (−2)	34 (1)	37 (3)	43 (6)	48 (9)	51 (11)	50 (10)	48 (9)	43 (6)	36 (2)	26 (−3)	26 (−3)
Average precipitation inches (mm)	4.35 (110)	4.35 (110)	3.21 (82)	1.37 (35)	0.75 (19)	0.20 (5.1)	0.00 (0.00)	0.05 (1.3)	0.10 (2.5)	1.13 (29)	2.44 (62)	4.66 (118)	22.61 (574)
Average precipitation days (≥ 0.01 in)	10.4	10.0	10.4	5.9	3.7	1.1	0.1	0.3	0.8	3.0	6.5	10.5	62.7
Source: NOAA

=== Vegetation ===
The higher rainfall in the hills supports woods of oak, madrona, pine, fir and a few redwood groves in the wetter areas. Before being logged in the 19th century, some of the tallest redwood trees in California (used for navigation by ships entering the Golden Gate) may have stood in the Oakland Hills. One old stump 30 feet (9.1 m) in diameter can be seen near Redwood Regional Park. Sunny, drier slopes are grassy or covered in scattered oaks and chaparral brush. Australian eucalyptus trees have been extensively planted in many areas, as they come from a similar climate.

== Demographics ==
Historical population
Census	Pop.	Note	%±
1860	1,543		—
1870	10,500		580.5%
1880	34,555		229.1%
1890	48,682		40.9%
1900	66,960		37.5%
1910	150,174		124.3%
1920	216,261		44.0%
1930	284,063		31.4%
1940	302,163		6.4%
1950	384,575		27.3%
1960	367,548		−4.4%
1970	361,561		−1.6%
1980	339,337		−6.1%
1990	372,242		9.7%
2000	399,484		7.3%
2010	390,724		−2.2%
2020	440,646		12.8%
2025 (est.)	440,838	▲	0.0%
U.S. Decennial Census; 1860–1870 1880-1890; 1900 1910 1920; 1930 1940 1950; 1960 1970 1980; 1990 2000 2010; 2020

The 2020 United States census reported Oakland had a population of 440,646. The population density was 7,898.30 inhabitants per square mile (3,049.55/km^{2}).

=== Religion ===
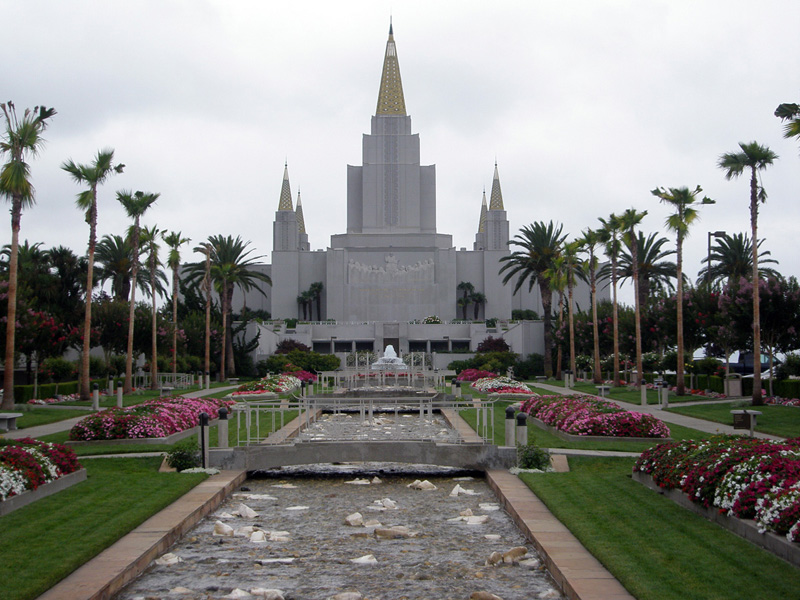
The Oakland Temple

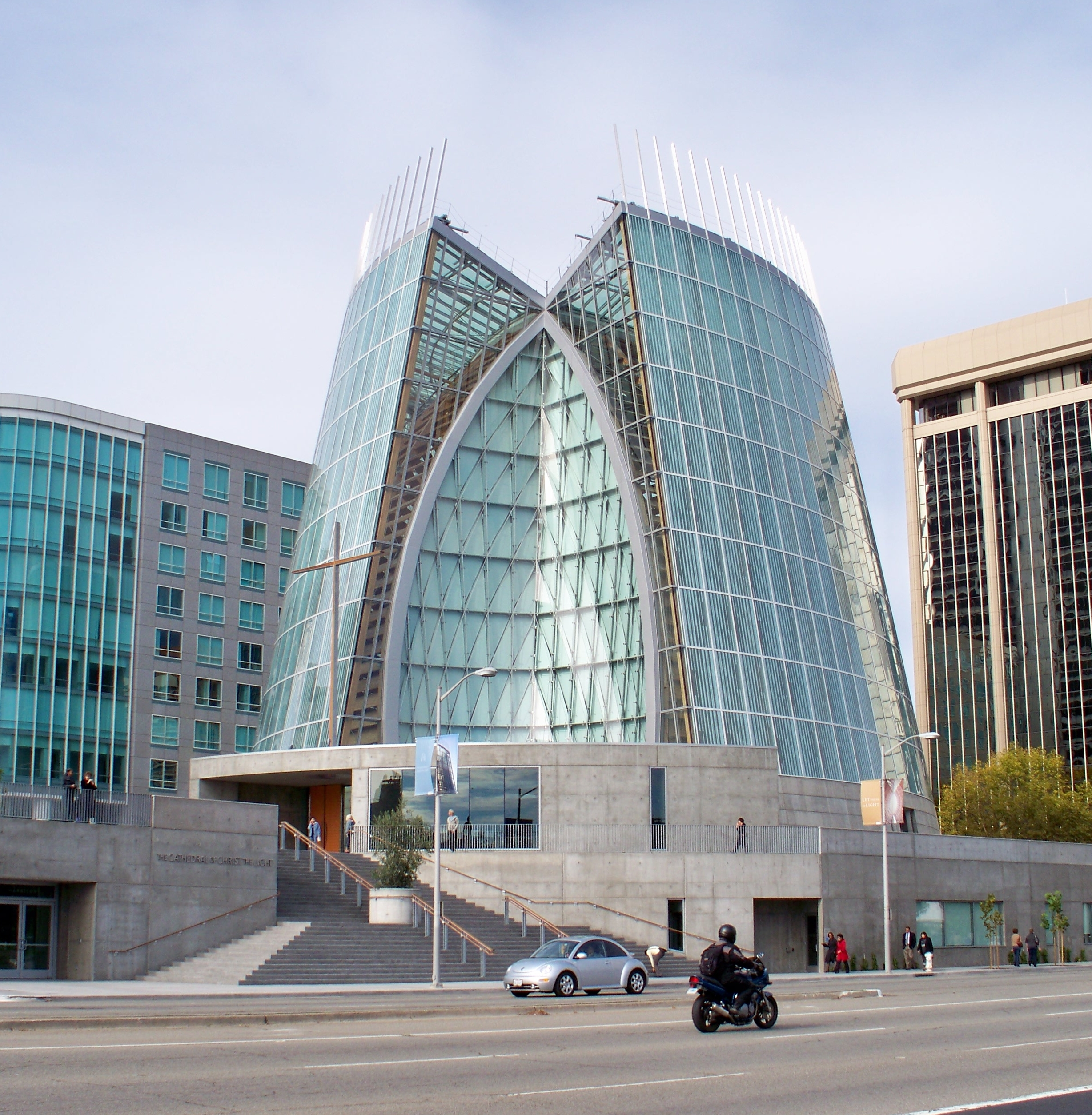
Cathedral of Christ the Light

34.95% of people in Oakland are affiliated with a religion, in a total of 417 congregations.

Major places of worship in Oakland include –

- Allen Temple Baptist Church, American Baptist Churches USA and the Progressive National Baptist Convention, Inc.
- Ascension Cathedral, Greek Orthodox
- Beth Jacob Congregation, Modern Orthodox Judaism
- Cathedral of Christ the Light, Roman Catholic
- Chinese Community Church, United Methodist
- Elmhurst Seventh-day Adventist Church, Seventh-day Adventist Church
- First Congregational Church of Oakland, United Church of Christ
- First Presbyterian Church of Oakland, Presbyterian
- First Unitarian Church, Unitarian
- Green Pastures, Evangelistic Outreach Association
- His Gospel Christian Fellowship
- Islamic Cultural Center of Northern California, Islam
- 31st Street Islamic Center, Islam
- Light-House Mosque, Islam
- Kingdom Hall of Jehovah's Witnesses, Jehovah's Witnesses
- Oakland California Temple, The Church of Jesus Christ of Latter-day Saints
- Oakland City Church
- Oakland Bahá'í Center
- Second Bethel Missionary Baptist Church
- St. Paul Lutheran Church, Lutheran
- St. Vartan Armenian Church, Armenian Apostolic Church
- Temple Beth Abraham, United Synagogue of Conservative Judaism
- Temple Sinai, Reform Judaism

=== Race and ethnicity ===
The 2020 United States census reported that the racial makeup of Oakland was 156,429 (35.5%) White, 104,873 (23.8%) Black or African American, 68,300 (15.5%) Asian, 2,643 (0.6%) Pacific Islander, 3,965 (0.9%) Native American, and 30,404 (6.9%) multiracial (two or more races). There were 118,974 (27.0%) of Hispanic or Latino ancestry, of any race.

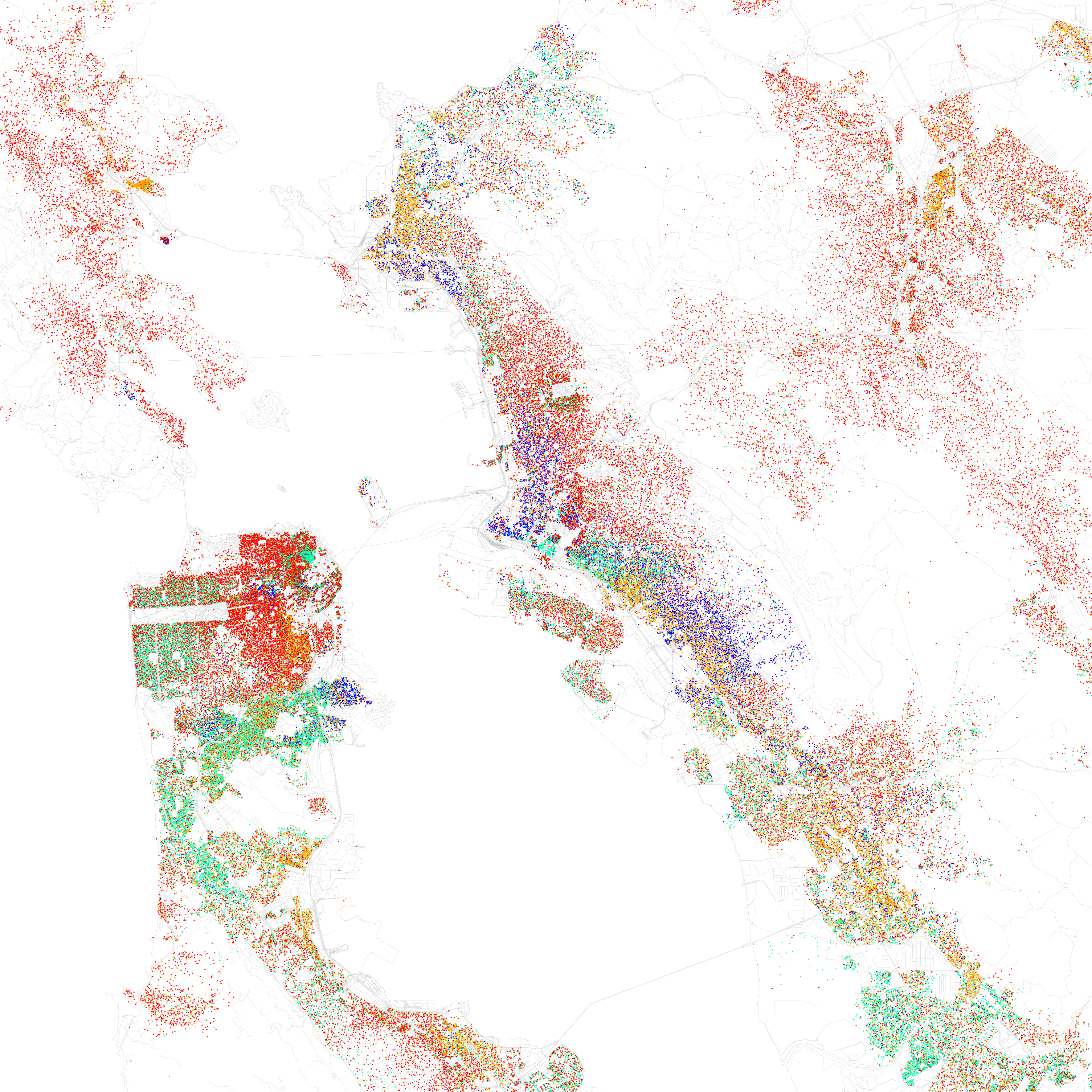
Map of racial distribution in San Francisco Bay Area, 2010 U.S. Census. Each dot is 25 people: ⬤ White ⬤ Black ⬤ Asian ⬤ Hispanic ⬤ Other

Historical racial composition	2022	2020	2010	1990	1970	1940
White	33.4%	30.0%	34.5%	32.5%	59.1%	95.3%
—Non-Hispanic	28.6%	27.3%	25.9%	28.3%	52.0% (Note: From 15% sample)	n/a
Black or African American	22.0%	23.8%	28.0%	43.9%	34.5%	2.8%
Hispanic or Latino (of any race)	27.2%	27.0%	25.3%	13.9%	7.6%	n/a
Asian	15.7%	16.1%	16.8%	14.8%	4.8%	–

From the 2010 United States census the racial makeup of Oakland was 134,925 (34.5%) White (non-Hispanic White 25.9%), 129,471 (28.0%) African American, 3,040 (0.8%) Native American, 65,811 (16.8%) Asian (8.7% Chinese, 2.2% Vietnamese, 1.6% Filipino, 0.7% Cambodian, 0.7% Laotian, 0.6% Korean, 0.5% Japanese, 0.5% Indian, 0.1% Mongolian), 2,222 (0.6%) Pacific Islander (0.3% Tongan), 53,378 (13.7%) from other races, and 21,877 (5.6%) from two or more races. There were 99,068 people of Hispanic or Latino ancestry, of any race (25.4%). 18.1% of the population were of Mexican descent, 1.9% Salvadoran, 1.3% Guatemalan, and 0.7% Puerto Rican.

Oakland city, California – Racial and ethnic composition Note: the US Census treats Hispanic/Latino as an ethnic category. This table excludes Latinos from the racial categories and assigns them to a separate category. Hispanics/Latinos may be of any race.
Race / Ethnicity (NH = Non-Hispanic)	Pop 1980	Pop 1990	Pop 2000	Pop 2010	Pop 2020	% 1980	% 1990	% 2000	% 2010	% 2020
White alone (NH)	119,347	105,203	93,953	101,308	120,187	35.17%	28.26%	23.52%	25.93%	27.28%
Black or African American alone (NH)	157,484	159,465	140,139	106,637	91,561	46.41%	42.84%	35.08%	27.29%	20.78%
Native American or Alaska Native alone (NH)	2,362	1,807	1,471	1,214	1,371	0.70%	0.49%	0.37%	0.31%	0.31%
Asian alone (NH)	26,980	53,025	60,393	65,127	69,906	7.95%	14.24%	15.12%	16.67%	15.86%
Native Hawaiian or Pacific Islander alone (NH)	x	x	1,866	2,081	2,668	x	x	0.47%	0.53%	0.61%
Other race alone (NH)	1,031	1,031	1,229	1,213	2,964	0.30%	0.28%	0.31%	0.31%	0.67%
Mixed race or Multiracial (NH)	x	x	12,966	14,076	25,146	x	x	3.25%	3.60%	5.71%
Hispanic or Latino (any race)	32,133	51,711	87,467	99,068	126,843	9.47%	13.89%	21.89%	25.35%	28.79%
Total	339,337	372,242	399,484	390,724	440,646	100.00%	100.00%	100.00%	100.00%	100.00%

=== 2024 United States Census Bureau American Community Survey estimates ===
Racial Makeup of Oakland (2024): 1. White alone (29.3%); 2. Black alone (18.5%); 3. Native American alone (2.58%); 4. Asian alone (16.5%); 5. Pacific Islander alone (0.56%); 6. Other race alone (20.6%); 7. Two or more races (11.9%)	Racial/Ethnic Makeup of Oakland excluding Hispanics from Racial Categories (2024); NH=Non-Hispanic: 1. White NH (27.9%); 2. Black NH (18.1%); 3. Native American NH (0.12%); 4. Asian NH (16.4%); 5. Pacific Islander NH (0.56%); 6. Other race NH (1.18%); 7. Two or more races NH (6.68%); 8. Hispanic Any Race (29.1%)	Racial Makeup of Hispanics in Oakland (2024): 1. White alone (4.74%); 2. Black alone (1.55%); 3. Native American alone (8.44%); 4. Asian alone (0.34%); 5. Pacific Islander alone (0.03%); 6. Other race alone (66.9%); 7. Two or more races (18.0%)

According to 2024 US Census Bureau estimates, Oakland's population was 443,575, and was 29.3% White (27.9% Non-Hispanic White and 1.4% Hispanic White), 18.5% Black or African American, 2.6% Native American and Alaskan Native, 16.5% Asian, 0.6% Pacific Islander, 20.6% Other Race, and 11.9% from two or more races.

White Americans are the largest racial/ethnic group at either 29.3% (including White Hispanics) or 27.9% (excluding White Hispanics).

Hispanics have been the second largest ethnic group since 2012 when they displaced the Black population. However, Black Americans still form the second largest racial group. By ethnicity, 29.1% of the total population is Hispanic-Latino (of any race) and 70.9% is Non-Hispanic (of any race). The majority of Hispanics self-identify as Some Other Race (66.9%) with the remainder choosing White (4.7%), Multiracial (18.0%), Black (1.6%), American Indian and Alaskan Native (8.4%), Asian (0.3%), and Hawaiian and Pacific Islander (0.1%).

The Black population is the third largest ethnic group and second largest racial group at either 18.5% (including Black Hispanics) or 18.1% excluding Black Hispanics. The population has continued to decline and numbers 80,236 per the 2024 American Community Survey.

The Asian population continues to remain the fourth largest group at 16.4% of the population.

5.1% are of English ancestry, French (except Basque), 1.4% German, 6.1% Irish - 6.2% Italian, 3.1% Norwegian, 1.1% Polish - 1.7% Scottish and 1.0%Subsaharan African 2.5%.

The most common ancestries in Oakland are German, Irish, English, Italian and European. Spanish and Chinese are the most common non-English spoken languages.

=== Educational attainment and income ===
The greater Oakland area has the fifth largest cluster of "elite zip codes" ranked by the number of households with the highest combination of income and education. 37.9% of residents over 25 years of age have bachelor's degree or higher. Oakland ranked among the top cities with residents with bachelor's degrees and graduate degrees per square mile.

Oakland ranks in the top 20 of American cities in median household income, with a 2012 value of US$51,863. In 2012, the median income for a household in the city was US$51,863 and the median income for a family was US$59,459. The mean income for a household was US$77,888 and the mean income for a family was US$90,948. Males had a median income of US$50,140 versus US$50,304 for females. The unemployment rate as of December 2013 was 9.7%.

In 2007 approximately 15.3 percent of families and 17.0 percent of the general population were below the poverty line, including 27.9 percent of those under age 18 and 13.1 percent of those age 65 or over. 0.7% of the population is homeless. Home ownership is 41% and 14% of rental units are subsidized.

As of the census of 2000, 19.4% of the population and 16.2% of families were below the poverty line. Out of the total population, 27.9% of those under the age of 18 and 13.1% of those 65 and older were living below the poverty line.

=== Households ===
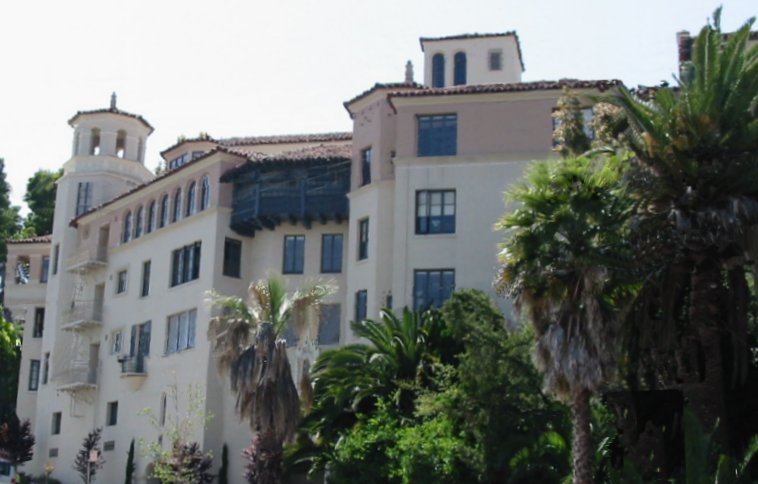
El Mirador, a historic Spanish Colonial Revival apartment building, built in 1931 by noted Bay Area architect Douglas Dacre Stone.

The census reported 382,586 people (97.9% of the population) lived in households, 5,675 (1.5%) lived in non-institutionalized group quarters, and 2,463 (0.6%) were institutionalized.

There were 153,791 households, out of which 44,762 (29.1%) had children under the age of 18 living in them, 50,797 (33.0%) were opposite-sex married couples living together, 24,122 (15.7%) had a female householder with no husband present, 8,799 (5.7%) had a male householder with no wife present. There were 11,289 (7.3%) unmarried opposite-sex partnerships, and 3,442 (2.2%) same-sex married couples or partnerships. 52,103 households (33.9%) were made up of individuals, and 13,778 (9.0%) had someone living alone who was 65 years of age or older. The average household size was 2.49. There were 83,718 families (54.4% of all households); the average family size was 3.27.

The population was spread out, with 83,120 people (21.3%) under the age of 18, 36,272 people (9.3%) aged 18 to 24, 129,139 people (33.1%) aged 25 to 44, 98,634 people (25.2%) aged 45 to 64, and 43,559 people (11.1%) who were 65 years of age or older. The median age was 36.2 years. For every 100 females, there were 94.2 males. For every 100 females age 18 and over, there were 91.8 males.

There were 169,710 housing units at an average density of 2,175.7 per square mile (840.0/km^{2}), of which 153,791 were occupied, of which 63,142 (41.1%) were owner-occupied, and 90,649 (58.9%) were occupied by renters. The homeowner vacancy rate was 3.0%; the rental vacancy rate was 8.5%. 166,662 people (42.7% of the population) lived in owner-occupied housing units and 215,924 people (55.3%) lived in rental housing units.

=== Shifting of cultures ===
Oakland has consistently ranked as one of the most ethnically diverse major cities in the country. A 2019 analysis by WalletHub showed that Oakland was the most ethnoracially diverse city in the United States. The city's formerly most populous ethnic group, whites, declined from 95.3% in 1940 to 32.5% by 1990, due to a combination of factors, including suburbanization. Oakland became a destination for African Americans in the Great Migration during and after World War II as they gained high-paying jobs in the defense industry. Blacks have formed a plurality in Oakland for many years, peaking in 1980 at about 47% of the population.

Oakland's Black population decreased by nearly 25 percent between 2000 and 2010. The city's demographics have changed due to a combination of rising housing prices associated with gentrification and with blacks relocating to better (and in many cases more affordable) housing in Bay Area suburbs or moving to the Southern United States in a reverse migration, where conditions (including race relations) are considered to have improved in comparison to previous generations. These trends and cultural shifts have led to a decline among some of Oakland's long standing black institutions, such as churches, businesses and nightclubs, which had developed during the growing years of the 1950s through 1970.

In the 2010 census African Americans maintained their status as Oakland's single largest ethnic group, with 27% of the population, followed by non-Hispanic whites at 25.9%, and Hispanics of any race at 25.4%. Ethnic Asians constitute 17%, followed by smaller minority groups.

Many immigrants have settled in the city. Immigrants and others have marched by the thousands down Oakland's International Boulevard in support of legal reforms benefiting undocumented immigrants.

An analysis by the Urban Institute of U.S. Census 2000 numbers showed Oakland had the third-highest concentration of gays and lesbians among the 50 largest U.S. cities, behind San Francisco and Seattle. Census data showed that among incorporated places that have at least 500 female couples, Oakland had the nation's largest proportion. In the 2000 census, 2,650 lesbian couples identified as such in Oakland; one in every 41 Oakland couples identified as a same-sex female partnership.

=== Gentrification ===
According to the lobbying non-profit National Community Reinvestment Coalition, from 2013-2017 the San Francisco-Oakland Metro shows indications of having the greatest intensity of gentrification nationally, with over 31% of eligible neighborhoods gentrifying. Gentrifying neighborhoods showed significant increases in median home value, median household income, percentage of college educated residents, but also in economic inequality.

In West Oakland, median household income rose from $80,700 to $86,300 between 2010 and 2017, while the percent of population with four-year degrees rose from one-third to nearly one-half, according to the National Community Reinvestment Coalition.

Local technology companies have created jobs in Oakland, and some new apartments have appeared, rents increased, and some working-class residents have moved to suburbs further inland. The city of Oakland has failed to approve new housing permits to keep up with demand for new housing, which caused housing prices to rise.

According to 2015 data compiled by the Bay Area Equity Atlas, 18% of low-income households of color were in neighborhoods that were gentrifying compared to 33.7% of low-income white households.

=== Crime ===
Oakland Homicides (Note: The homicide rate is not the same as murder rate. Murders are a subset of homicides. In 2000, for insurance, there were 109 homicides in Oakland, of which 102 were classified as murders; similarly in 2018, there were 75 homicides: 68 murders and 7 categorized as justifiable homicides or killings in self-defense.)
1992	175
1995	153
1996	102
1997	99
1998	72
1999	60
2000	85
2001	87
2002	113
2003	114
2004	88
2005	94
2006	148
2007	127
2008	125
2009	110
2010	95
2011	110
2012	131
2013	92
2014	86
2015	83
2016	85
2017	72
2018	75
2019	78
2020	109
2021	134
2022	120
2023	126
2024	86

A 2014 study by the Chief Justice Earl Warren Institute on Law & Social Policy at the University of California, Berkeley School of Law examined crime in the city from 1987 to 2012 and concluded that "The story of crime in Oakland over the last 25 years is a nuanced one, as there are both positive and negative aspects of the crime trends." Crime dramatically decreased since the early 1990s but the city has continued to suffer from serious violent crime problems. Crime trends generally tracked comparison cities of Fresno, Richmond, Sacramento, and Stockton "in terms of direction if not magnitude"; this suggested that crime trends are regional rather than city-specific.

A 2007 journal article identified crime in Oakland as being fueled by the dramatic increase of street narcotics sales and use since the 1970s, with Oakland becoming a major west-coast hub for heroin and cocaine distribution. Subsequent battle for control over the lucrative narcotics trade incited gang conflicts and violence, with shootings becoming a regular occurrence. A concurrent rise in rape, robbery, burglary, auto-theft and other crimes occurred as well. Prior to 1960, there had been successful government-funded social programs whereby rebellious teens were enrolled in youth centers that would teach them proper values and improve their behavior. Similar programs since then have been inconsistent.

By the 1970s, the police and Federal Bureau of Investigation (FBI) used military tactics such as SWAT teams, infiltration and counter intelligence in an attempt to counter groups such as the Black Panthers (responsible for several police ambushes), the S.L.A. and organized drug gangs such as the "69 Mob", with increases in arrests, prosecutions, and imprisonment. During the first decade of the 21st century, Oakland has consistently been listed as one of the most dangerous large cities in the United States.

The number of Oakland Police Department officers has varied from a low of 626 (in 1996 and in 2012) to a high of 814 (in 2002). There were 723 officers at the end of 2015. The city's strategic plan recommended 925 officers, and an independent study commissioned by the city in the mid-1990s recommended 1,200 officers. As of 2025, the city employed only 675 police officers, budgeted for only 600, and of these, 100 were on leave.

Among Oakland's 35 police patrol beats, violent crime remains a serious problem in specific East and West Oakland neighborhoods. In 2008, homicides were concentrated: 72% occurred in three City Council districts, District 3 in West Oakland and Districts 6 and 7 in East Oakland, although these districts have 44% of Oakland's residents.

In 2012, Oakland implemented Operation Ceasefire, a gang violence reduction plan used in other cities, based in part on the research and strategies of author David M. Kennedy.

From 2024 to 2025, the crime rate has gone down by 29%, and youth employment programs has increased by 13.3%.

== Economy ==
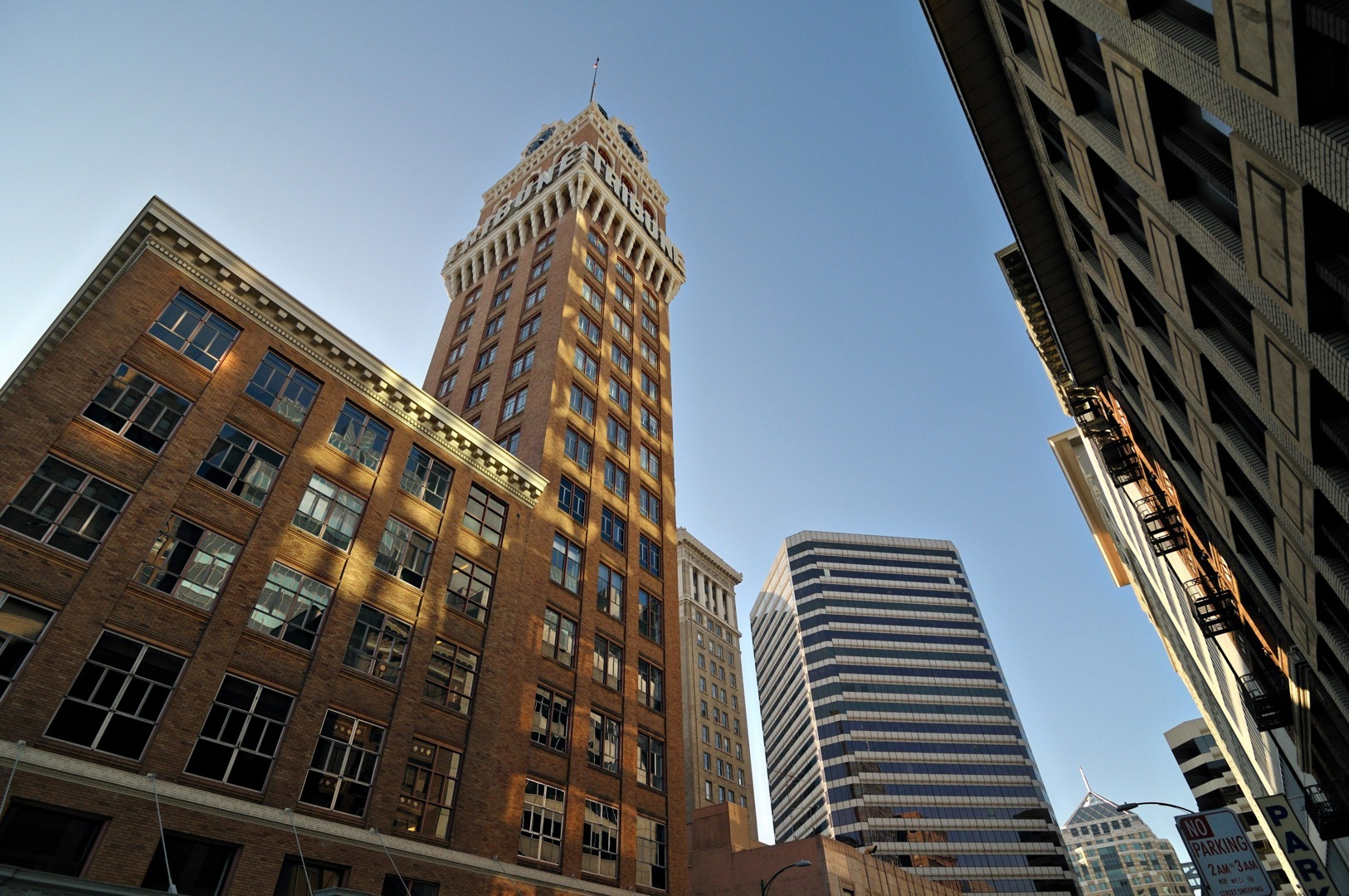
The iconic Tribune Tower, from 13th St. and Franklin St. in Downtown

Oakland is a major West Coast port, and the fifth-busiest in the United States by cargo volume. The Port of Oakland handles 99% of all containerized goods moving through Northern California, representing $41 billion worth of international trade. There are nearly 200,000 jobs related to marine cargo transport in the Oakland area. These jobs range from minimum wage hourly positions to Transportation Storage and Distribution Managers who earn an annual average salary of US$91,520.

The Port of Oakland was an early innovator/pioneer in the technologies of Intermodal Containerized Shipping. The city is also home to several major corporations including Kaiser Permanente, Clorox, and Dreyer's ice cream. Tech companies such as Ask.com and Pandora Radio are in Oakland, and in recent years many start-up high tech and green energy companies have found a home in the downtown neighborhoods of Uptown, City Center, Jack London Square and Lake Merritt Financial District.

As of 2013, the San Francisco-Oakland-Hayward metropolitan area has a gross domestic product (GDP) of US$360.4 billion, ranking eighth among metropolitan areas in the United States. In 2014, Oakland was amongst the best cities to start a career, the highest ranked city in California after San Francisco. Additionally, Oakland ranked fourth in cities with professional opportunities. Numerous companies in San Francisco continue to expand in or migrate over to Oakland.

Oakland experienced an increase of both its population and of land values in the early-to-mid first decade of the 21st century. The 10k Plan, which began during former mayor Elihu Harris' administration, and intensified during former mayor Jerry Brown's administration resulted in several thousand units of new multi-family housing and development. In 2023, Oakland became the first American city ever to lose three professional major league sports teams to other cities within a five-year span.

=== Top employers ===
As of 2024, the top employers in the city were:

#	Employer	# of Employees
1	Kaiser Permanente	11,500+
2	County of Alameda	8,000+
3	Oakland Unified School District	5,500+
4	City of Oakland	4,500+
5	State of California	4,000+
6	Bay Area Rapid Transit	4,000+
7	Southwest Airlines	3,000+
8	Alameda Health System	2,500+
9	Children's Hospital Oakland	2,500+
10	Federal Express	2,000+

=== Tourism ===
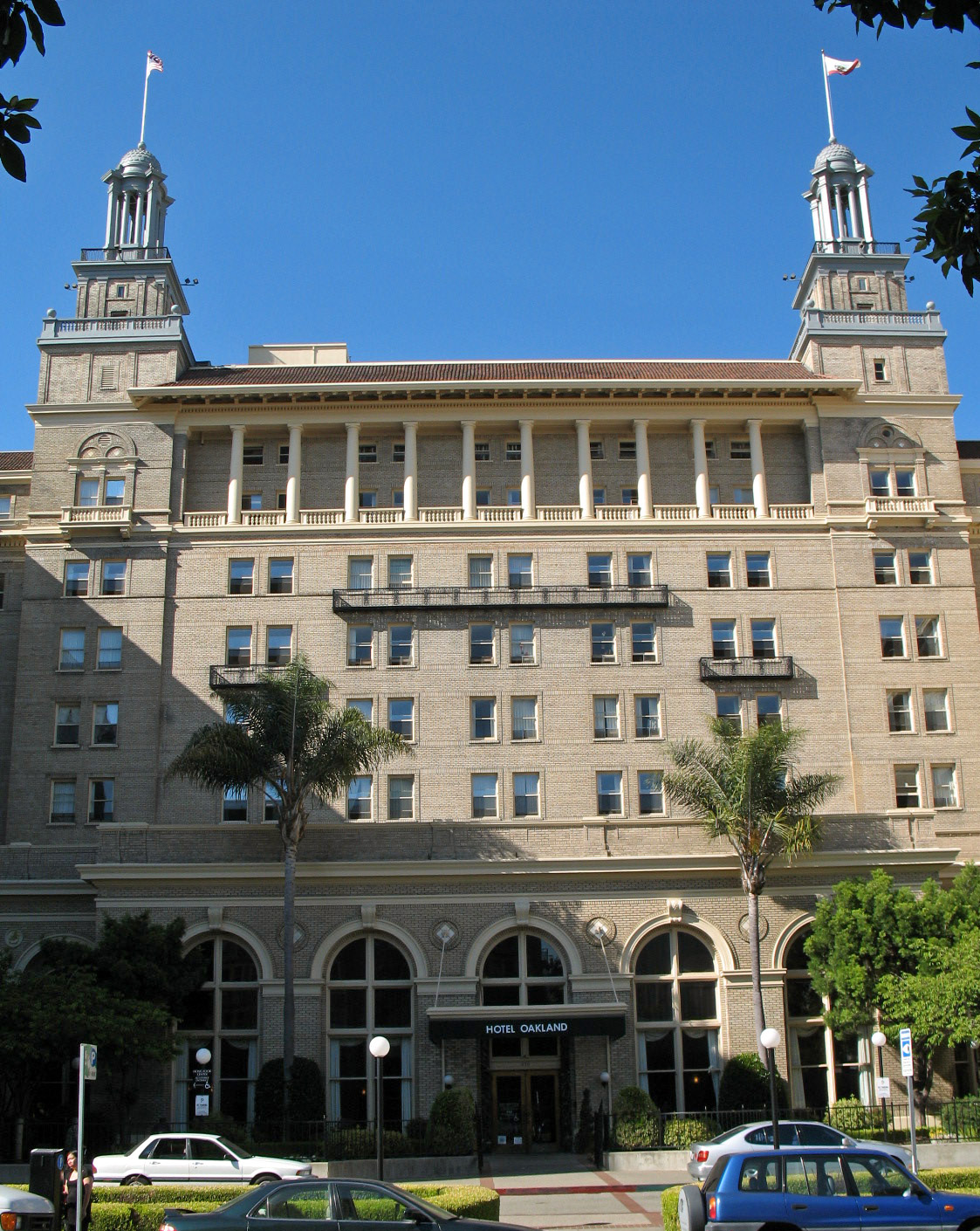
The historic Oakland Hotel, built in 1912 by Francis Marion Smith

In 2013, over 2.5 million people visited Oakland, contributed US$1.3 billion into the economy. Oakland has been experiencing an increase in hotel demand. Occupancy is 74%, while RevPAR (Revenue Per Available Room) increased by 14%, the highest increase of any big city in the western region of the United States. Both Oakland and San Francisco were forecasted to experience the highest increases in ADR (Average daily rate).

In recent years, Oakland has gained national recognition as a travel destination. In 2012, The New York Times named Oakland the top North American city to visit, highlighting its growing number of sophisticated restaurants and bars, top music venues, and increasing nightlife appeal. Oakland also took the No. 16 spot in "America's Coolest Cities", ranked by metrics like entertainment options and recreational opportunities per capita, etc. In 2013, Oakland topped the No. 1 spot in "America's Most Exciting Cities", notably having the most movie theaters, theater companies, and museums per square mile. In "America's Most Hipster Cities", Oakland took the number-5 spot, cited for luring San Francisco "hippies" into the city. Oakland has also increased its travel destination allure internationally.

== Arts and culture ==
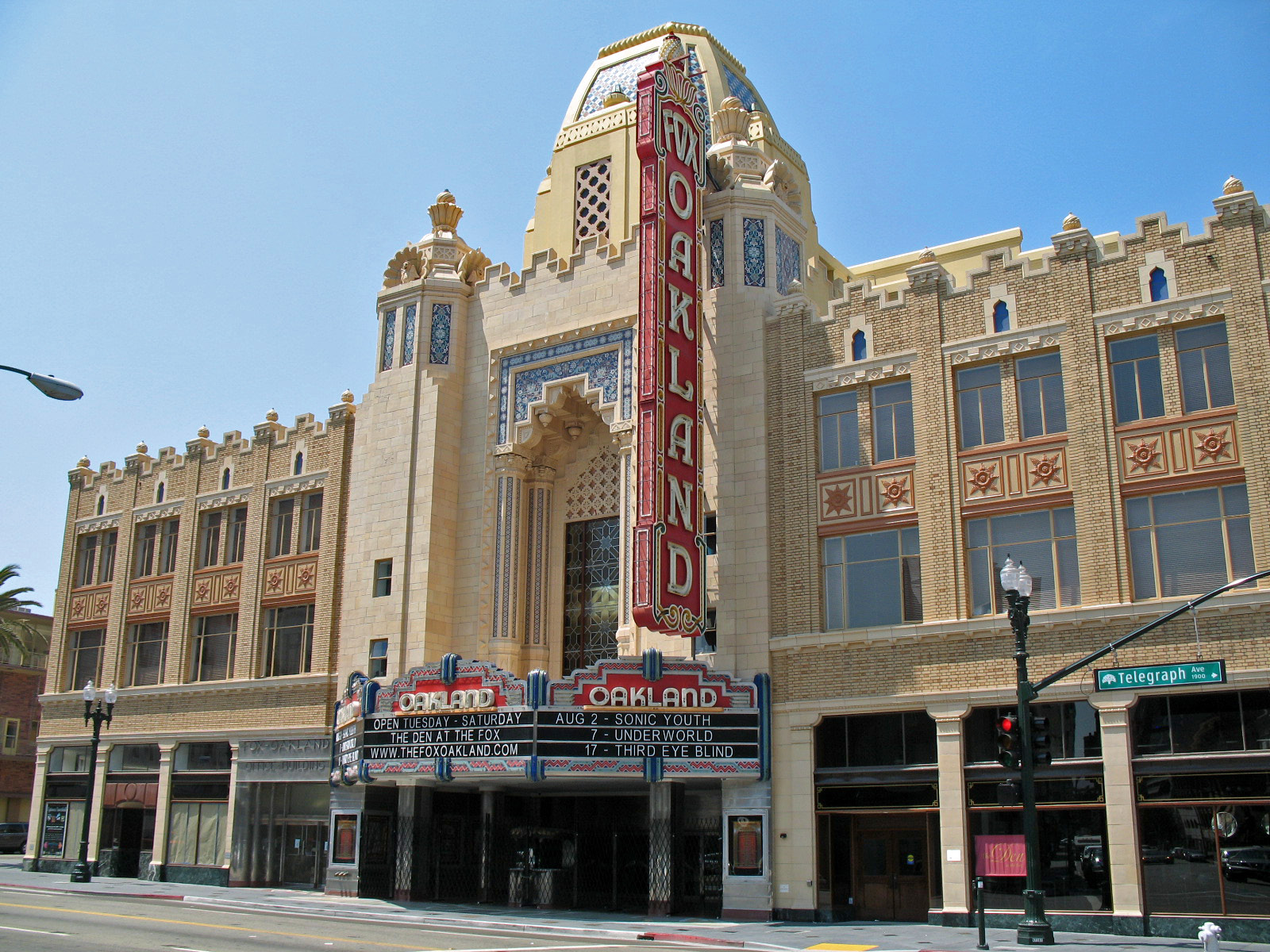
Fox Oakland Theater first opened in 1928. The theatre is listed on the National Register of Historic Places.

Oakland has a art scene and claims the highest concentration of artists per capita in the United States. In 2013, Oakland was designated as one of America's top twelve art communities, recognizing Downtown (including Uptown), Chinatown, Old Oakland, and Jack London Square as communities "that have most successfully combined art, artists and venues for creativity and expression with independent businesses, retail shops and restaurants, and a walkable lifestyle to make vibrant neighborhoods".

Galleries exist in various parts of Oakland, with the newest additions centered mostly in the Uptown area. Oakland ranked 11th in cities for designers and artists. The city is a renowned culinary hotbed, offering both a wide variety and innovative approaches to diverse cuisines in restaurants and markets, often featuring locally grown produce and international styles such as French, Italian, Portuguese/Spanish, Ethiopian, Asian, Latin American, as well as Caribbean, Southern United States/Louisiana Creole, etc., all of which reflects the culinary traditions of the city's ethnically diverse population.

Historically a focal point of the West Coast blues and jazz scenes, Oakland is also home to musicians representing such genres as rhythm and blues, gospel, funk, punk, heavy metal, Rap/Gangsta rap, and hip-hop. Artists who come out of Oakland include Green Day, Tower of Power, Mistah F.A.B., E-40, Too Short, Tupac Shakur, Raphael Saadiq, MC Hammer, Keyshia Cole, Kehlani, G-Eazy, Del the Funky Homosapien, Edwin Hawkins, Tony! Toni! Toné! and many more.

=== Attractions ===
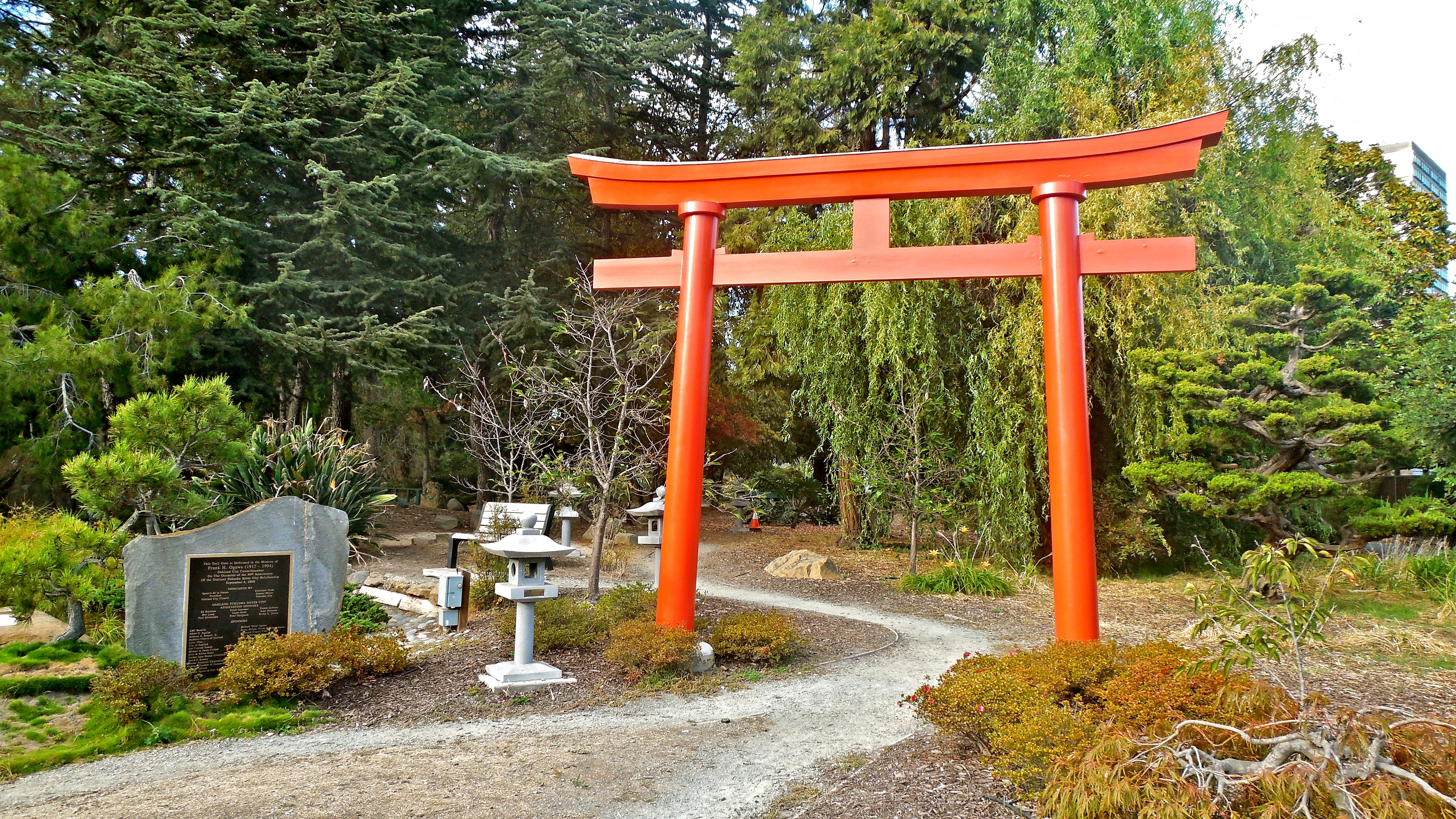
Frank H. Ogawa Memorial Torii at the Gardens of Lake Merritt

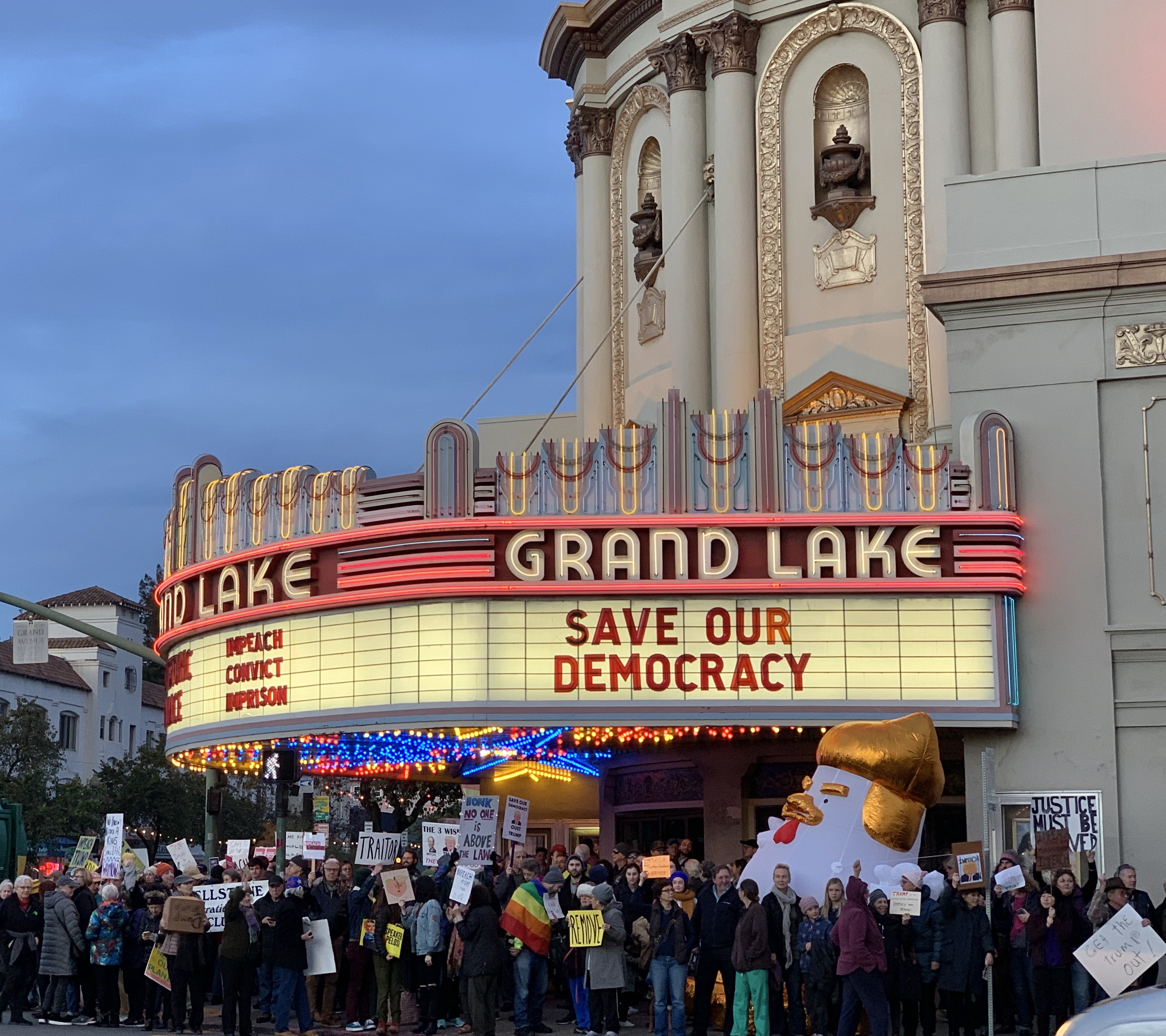
Grand Lake Theatre

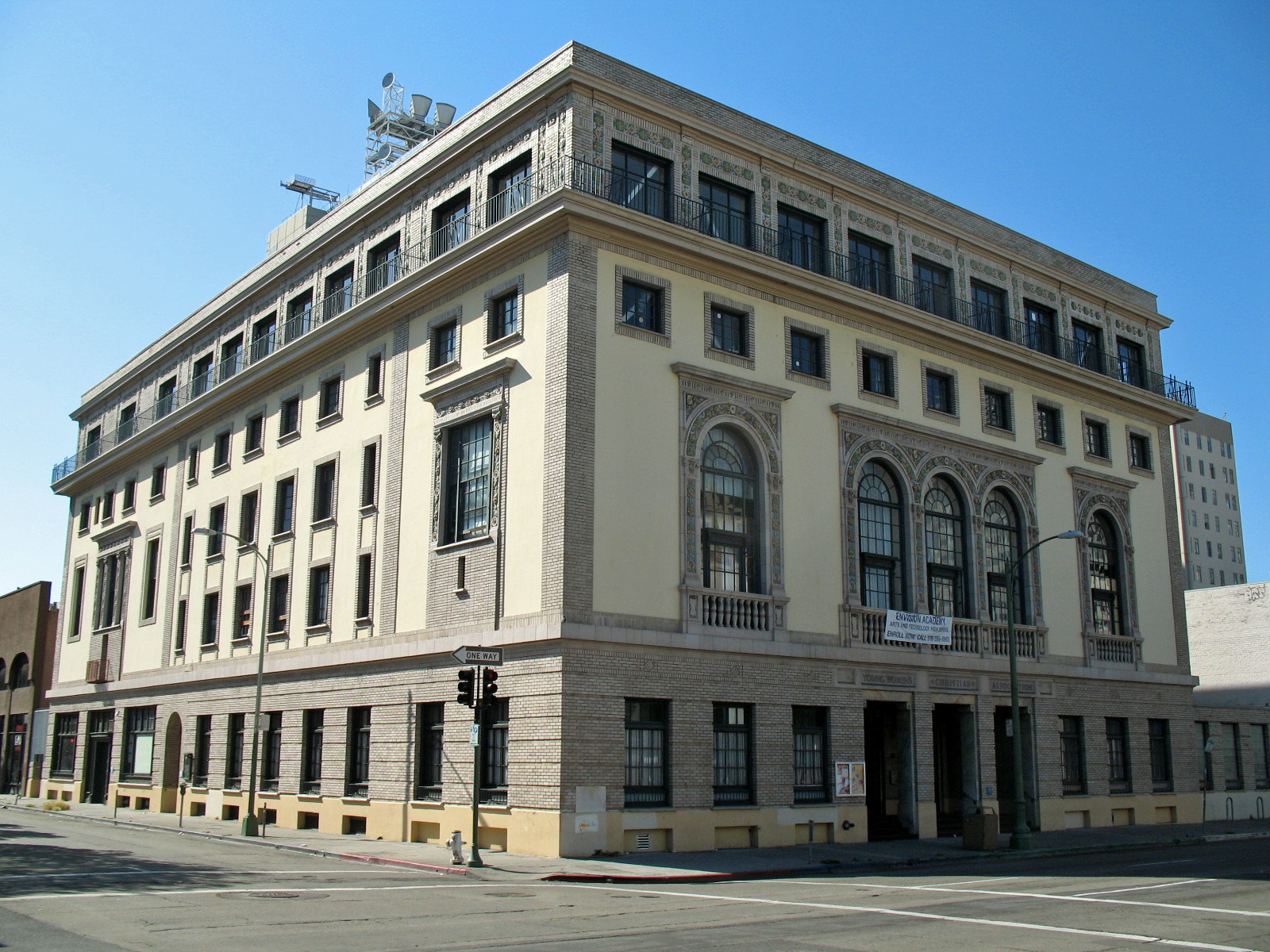
The historic Oakland YWCA, designed by Julia Morgan

- African American Museum and Library at Oakland
- AXIS Dance Company
- Chabot Space and Science Center
- Children's Fairyland
- Chinatown
- Dunsmuir House
- Fox Oakland Theatre, concert venue
- Jack London Square
- Joaquin Miller Park
- Lake Merritt, Listed on the National Register of Historic Places, oldest wildlife/bird sanctuary in North America, Lake Merritt Garden Center, Bonsai Garden
- Lake Temescal
- Mountain View Cemetery, designed by Frederick Law Olmsted and resting place of many famous Californians
- Oakland–Alameda County Coliseum, former home of baseball's Oakland Athletics, and the Oakland Raiders of the NFL
- Oakland Aviation Museum
- Oakland California Temple, includes the gardens, visitors' center, family history center, & concert hall
- Oakland Museum of California
- Oakland Public Library
- Oakland Symphony
- Oakland Zoo
- Oakland Arena, directly adjacent to the Oakland Coliseum, former home to the Golden State Warriors of the NBA
- Paramount Theatre
- Pardee Home
- Peralta Hacienda Historical Park, Museum of History and Culture
- Redwood Regional Park
- Preservation Park
- USS Potomac, Franklin D. Roosevelt's presidential yacht

=== Nightlife ===
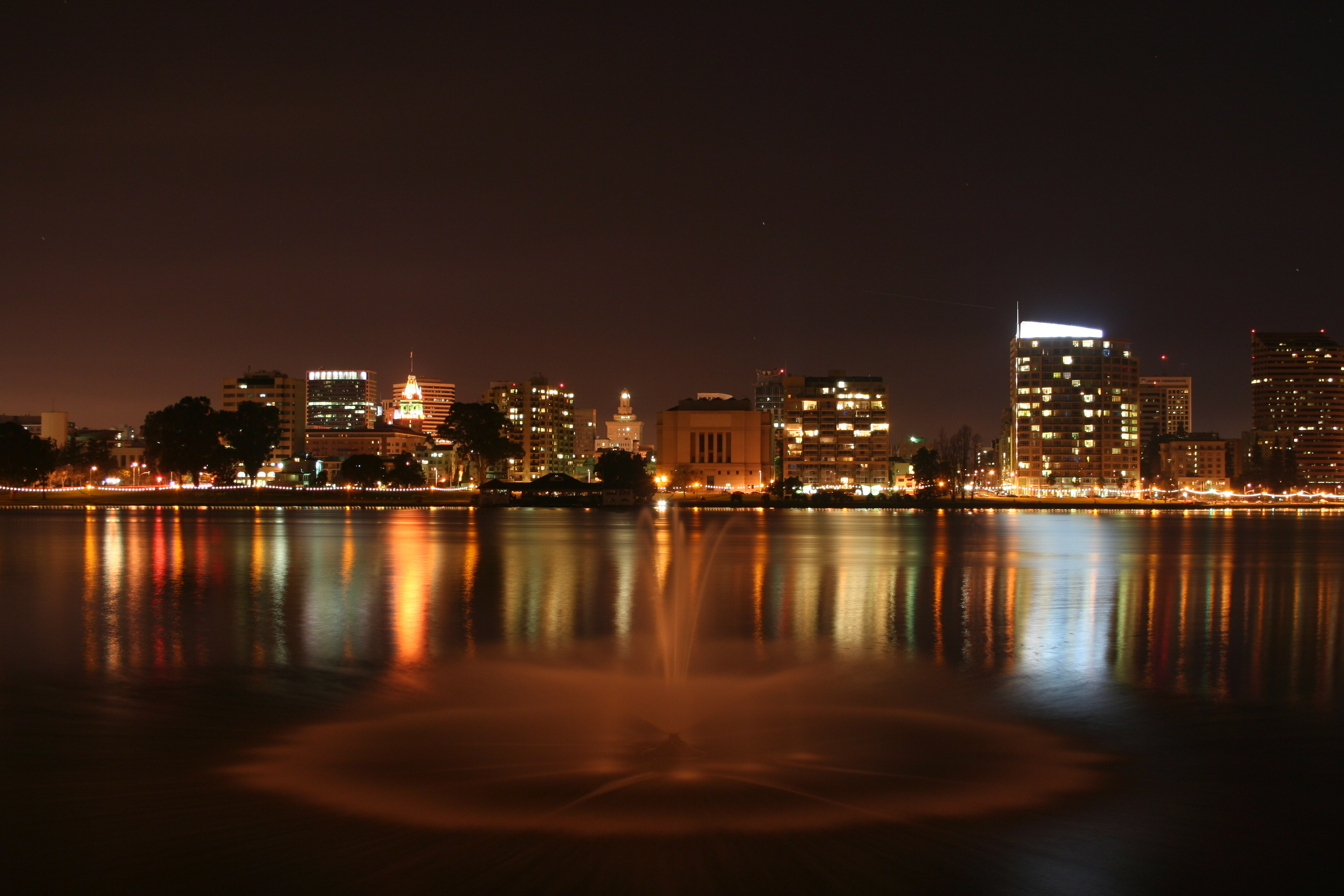
A night view of the Downtown skyline and Lakeside Apartments District as seen from the East 18th Street Pier

Downtown Oakland has an assortment of bars and nightclubs. They include dive bars, dance clubs, modern lounges and jazz bars. The Paramount Theater features headlining musical tours and productions, while Fox Oakland Theatre draws various musical genres including jam bands, rock, punk, blues, jazz, and reggae. The Paramount and Fox theaters often book simultaneous events, creating busy nights uptown. In 2012, Oakland was dubbed a "New Sin City", following its 2010 decision to relax its cabaret laws, which gave a boost to its nightclub and bar scene.

Recent years have seen the growth of the Oakland Art Murmur event, occurring in the Uptown neighborhood the first Friday evening of every month. The event attracts around 20,000 people along twenty city blocks, featuring live performances, food trucks, and over 30 galleries and venues.

=== "There is no there there" ===
In her 1937 book Everybody's Autobiography, Gertrude Stein said of Oakland: "There is no there there", upon learning that the neighborhood where she lived as a child had been torn down to make way for an industrial park. The quote is usually misconstrued to refer to Oakland as a whole.

Modern-day Oakland has made steps to rebuke Stein's claim with a statue downtown titled There. In 2005 a sculpture called HERETHERE was installed by the City of Berkeley on the Berkeley-Oakland border at Martin Luther King Jr. Way. The sculpture consists of eight-foot-tall letters spelling "HERE" and "THERE" in front of the BART tracks as they descend from their elevated section in Oakland to the subway through Berkeley.

== Sports ==
Oakland's former baseball team, the Oakland Athletics of Major League Baseball won three consecutive World Series championships in 1972, 1973, and 1974, and appeared in another three consecutive World Series from 1988 to 1990, winning their fourth championship in 1989. Formerly based at the Oakland Coliseum, the Oakland Athletics announced plans to move to Las Vegas to play at a new 33,000-seat partially retractable ballpark on the Las Vegas Strip with the team itself spending three seasons at Sutter Health Park in West Sacramento as a temporary home. The move leaves Oakland without a major professional sports team for the first time since 1959.

Oakland's former football team, the Oakland Raiders of the National Football League (NFL), won Super Bowl XI in 1976 and Super Bowl XV in 1980, during their tenure in Oakland. The Raiders relocated to Las Vegas in 2020 and are now known as the Las Vegas Raiders.

Oakland's former basketball team, the Golden State Warriors won the 1974–75, 2014–15, 2016–17, and the 2017–18 NBA championships, while losing in 2016 and 2019. The Warriors, whose primary owners reside in Southern California, announced in April 2014 that they would leave Oakland once their new arena was built across the Bay in San Francisco. In 2019, the Warriors built and moved to Chase Center across the Bay. Since the team remained in the Bay Area, they decided not to revert to the San Francisco Warriors name it had in its first stint with the city.

The Oakland Roots SC are a professional soccer team that was formed in 2018. The Roots began play in 2019 in a new third division professional league known as the National Independent Soccer Association, however, the team announced that it would move into the second division of US professional soccer, and play in the USL Championship beginning in the 2021 season. The Roots play their home matches at Oakland Coliseum.

The Oakland Soul SC, a woman's professional soccer club began play in May 2023 as an expansion team in the USL W League, a pre-professional league; they also play at the Oakland Coliseum.

Oakland's former hockey team, the California Golden Seals were a professional ice hockey club that competed in the National Hockey League (NHL) from 1967 to 1976. Based in Oakland, they played their home games at the Oakland–Alameda County Coliseum Arena. The Seals were one of six teams added to the league as part of the 1967 NHL expansion. Initially named the California Seals, the team was renamed the Oakland Seals during the 1967–68 season and then the Bay Area Seals in 1970 before becoming the California Golden Seals the same year. The Seals were the least successful of the teams added in the 1967 expansion, never earning a winning record and only making the playoffs twice in nine seasons of play. Off the ice, they were plagued by low attendance. The franchise was relocated prior to the beginning of the 1976–77 season to become the Cleveland Barons, who would cease operation two years later.

Oakland's ultimate team, Oakland Spiders, relocated to Oakland in 2022 after playing eight years as the San Jose Spiders.

Club	Sport	Founded	League	Venue
San Francisco Unicorns	Cricket	2023 (in Oakland since 2025)	MLC	Oakland Coliseum
Oakland Roots SC	Soccer	2019	USLC (USL in future)	Oakland Coliseum
Oakland Soul SC	Soccer	2023	USLW (USLS in future)	Oakland Coliseum
Oakland Spiders	Ultimate	2014 (in Oakland since 2022)	UFA (formerly in AUDL)	Oakland Technical High School
Oakland Ballers	Baseball	2023	PL	Raimondi Park

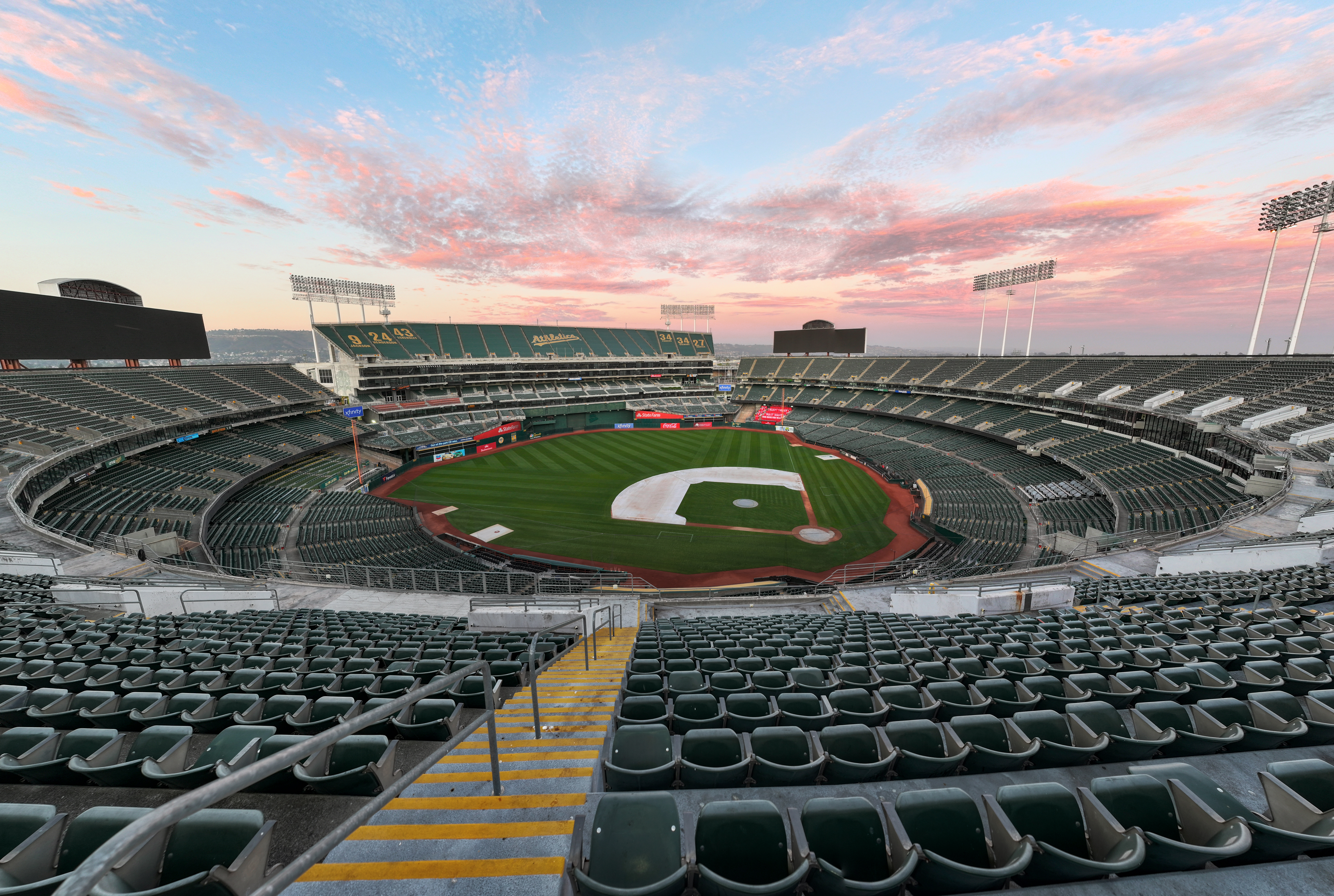
The Oakland Coliseum, former home of the Oakland Athletics baseball team and Oakland Raiders football team.

Oakland's former sports teams include:

- Oakland Athletics, Major League Baseball, 1968–2024. (played at the Oakland Coliseum before temporarily relocating to Sacramento in 2024 and fully relocating to Las Vegas in 2028.)
- Oakland Raiders, National Football League, 1960–1981, 1995–2019. (played at the Oakland Coliseum before relocating to Los Angeles in 1981 and Las Vegas in 2020.)
- Golden State Warriors, National Basketball Association, 1971–2019. (played in Oakland Arena before moving back to San Francisco for the 2019–20 season.)
- Oakland Oaks, Pacific Coast League of Baseball, 1903–1955. (The Oaks played at Oaks Park in Emeryville after 1912.)
- Oakland Larks, West Coast Negro Baseball League, 1946.
- Oakland Hornets, member of American Football League (1944)
- Oakland Oaks, American Basketball League, 1962.
- Oakland Oaks, American Basketball Association, 1967–1969.
- Oakland Seals, National Hockey League, 1967–1976.
- Oakland Clippers, National Professional Soccer League, 1967; North American Soccer League, 1968.
- Oakland Stompers, North American Soccer League, 1978.
- Oakland Invaders, United States Football League, 1983–1985.
- Oakland Skates, Roller Hockey International, 1993–1996.
- Oakland Slammers, International Basketball League, 2005–2006.

== Parks and recreation ==
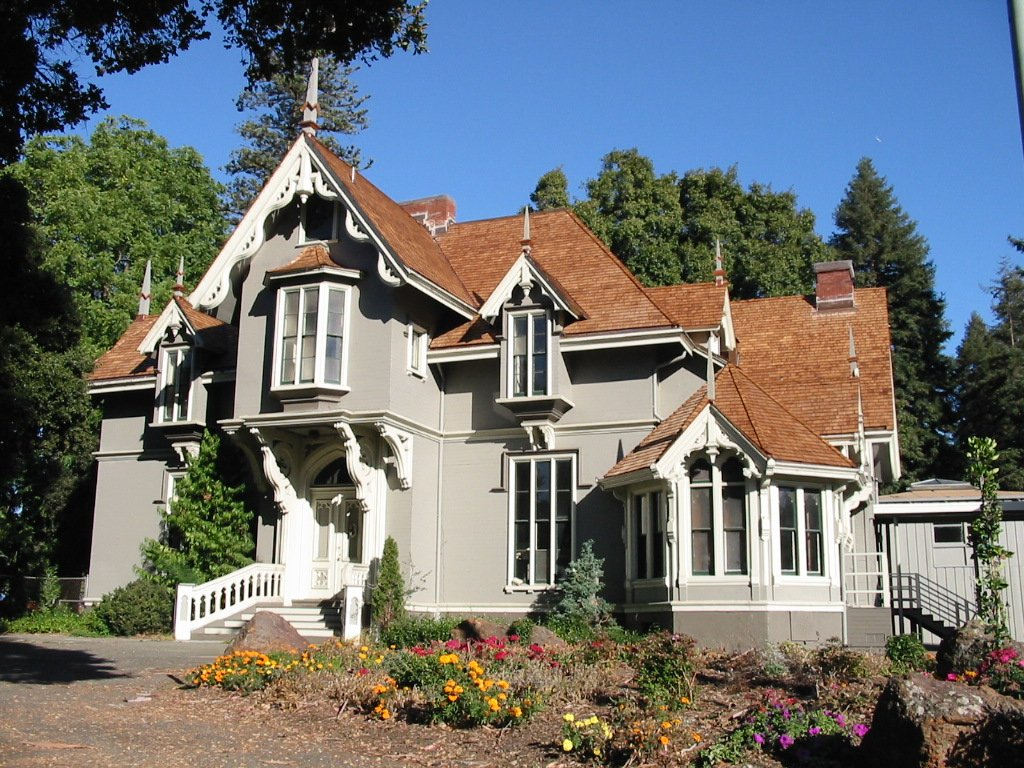
J. Mora Moss House in Mosswood Park was built in 1864 by San Francisco businessman Joseph Moravia Moss in the Carpenter Gothic style. The building houses Parks and Recreation offices and storage.

=== Parks ===
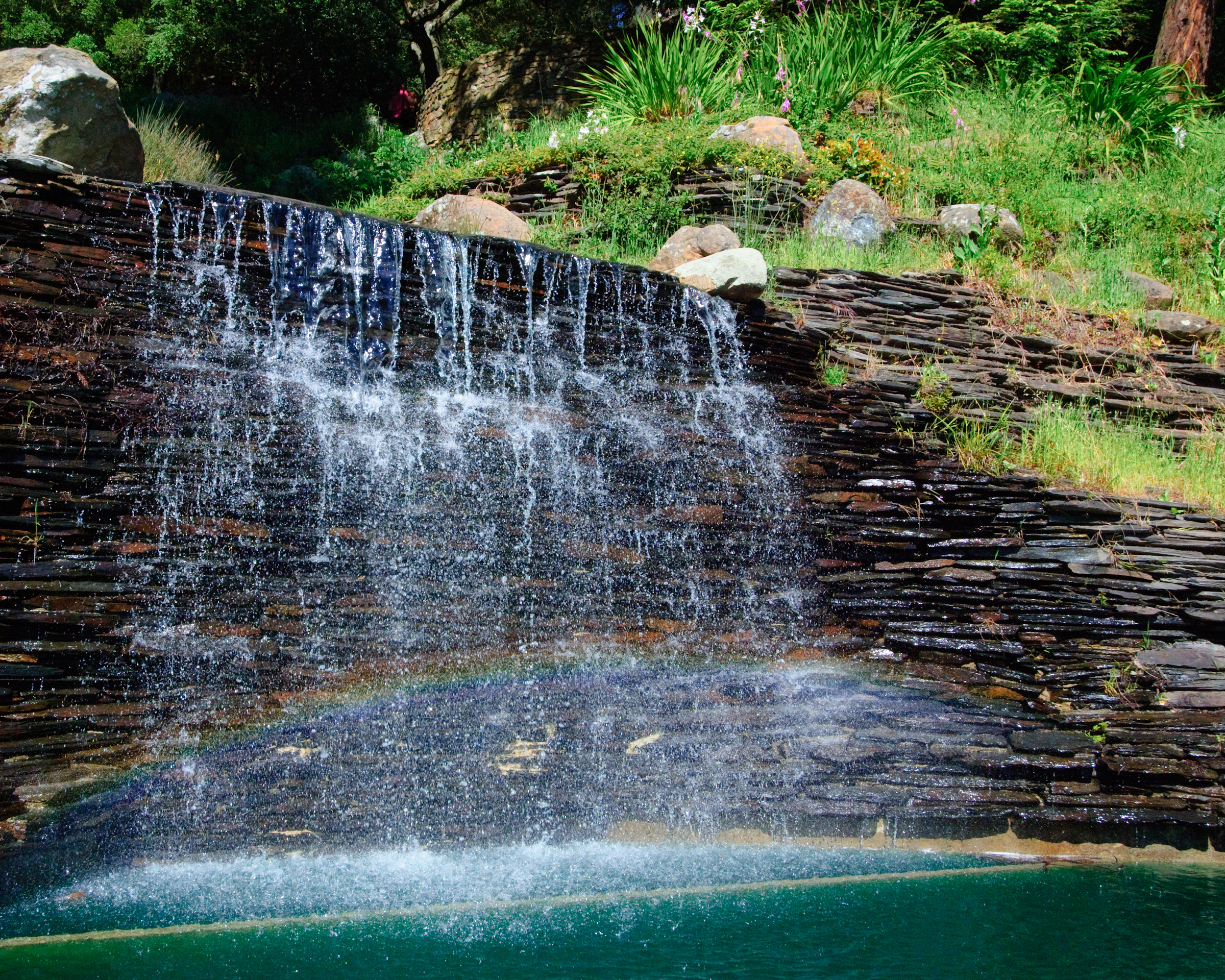
Cascade Waterfall, Joaquin Miller Park

Oakland has many parks and recreation centers which total 5,937 acres (2,403 ha). In its 2013 ParkScore ranking, The Trust for Public Land, a national land conservation organization, reported that Oakland had the 18th best park system among the 50 most populous U.S. cities. In 2013, Oakland ranked fourth among American cities as an urban destination for nature lovers.

Some of the city's most notable parks include:

- Allendale Park
- Bushrod Park
- Joaquin Miller Park
- Joseph Knowland State Arboretum and Park, home of the Oakland Zoo
- Lake Merritt
- Morcom Rose Garden best from July through October
- Mosswood Park
- Peralta Hacienda Historical Park, headquarters of the Peralta rancho, Rancho San Antonio
- William Joseph McInnes Botanic Garden and Campus Arboretum on the Mills College campus

Additionally, the following nine East Bay Regional Parks are entirely or partially in the city of Oakland:

- Anthony Chabot Regional Park
- Claremont Canyon Regional Preserve
- Dr. Aurelia Reinhardt Redwood Regional Park
- Huckleberry Botanic Regional Preserve
- Judge John Sutter Regional Shoreline
- Leona Canyon Regional Open Space Preserve
- Roberts Regional Recreation Area
- Robert Sibley Volcanic Regional Preserve
- Temescal Regional Recreation Area

McLaughlin Eastshore State Park is partially in the city of Oakland and although it is a California State Park, it is managed by the East Bay Regional Park District.

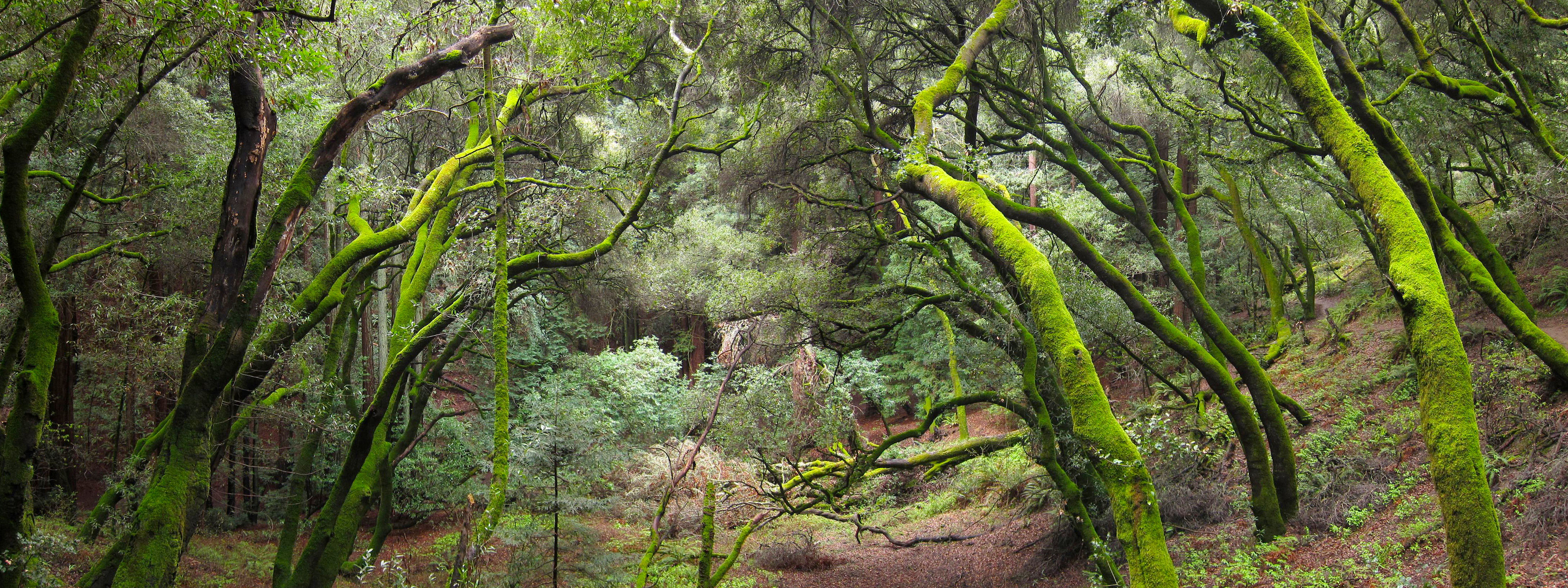
French Trail, Redwood Regional Park

== Government ==
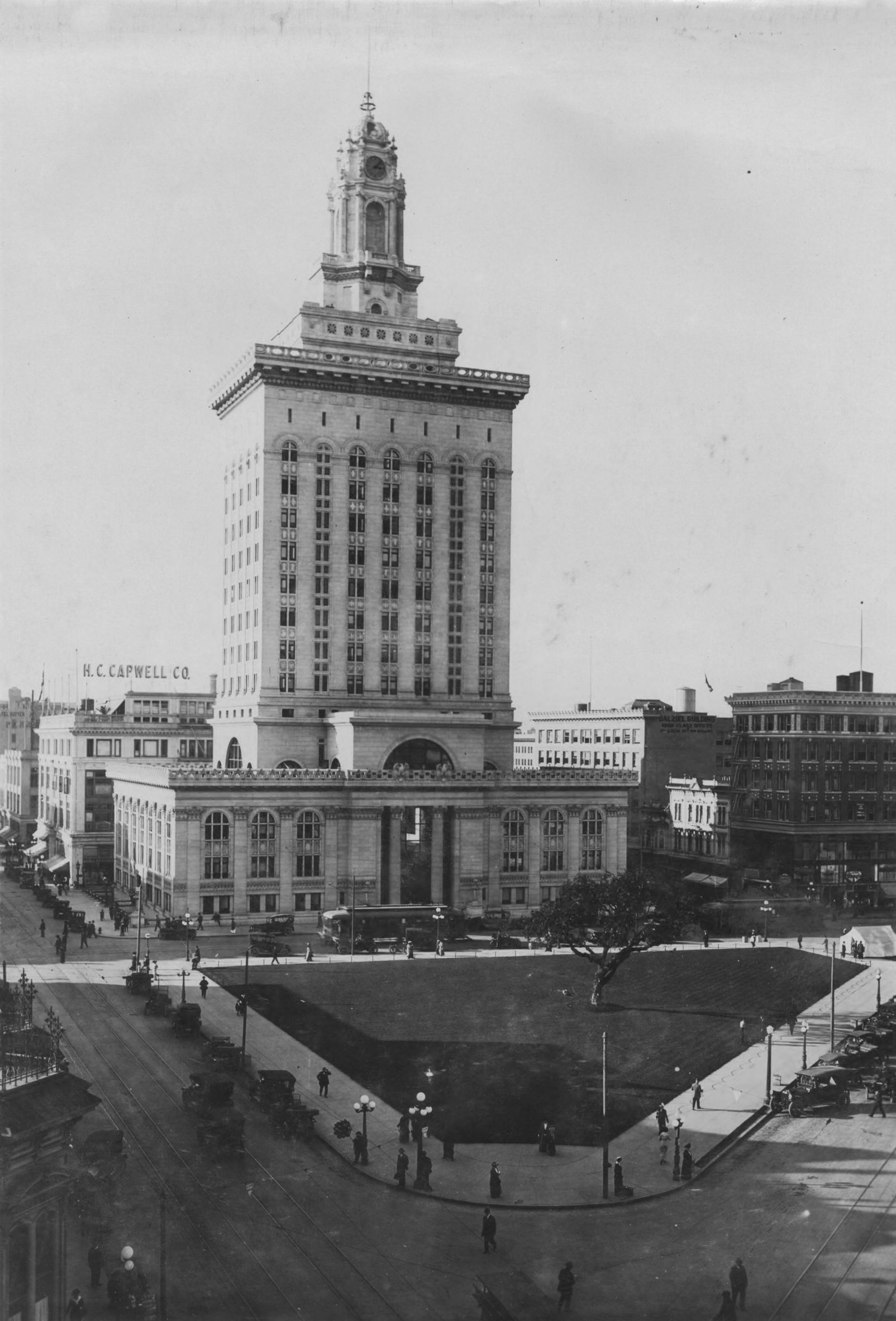
Oakland City Hall and central plaza in 1917. Built of framed steel with unreinforced masonry infill at a cost of US$2 million in 1914. The structure was the tallest building in the city until the Tribune Tower was built in 1923.

Oakland has a mayor-council government. The mayor is elected at-large for a four-year term. The Oakland City Council has eight council members representing seven districts in Oakland with one member elected at-large and others from single-member districts; council members serve staggered four-year terms. The mayor appoints a city administrator, subject to the confirmation by the City Council, who is the city's chief administrative officer. Other city officers include: city attorney (elected), city auditor (elected), and city clerk (appointed by city administrator). Oakland's mayor is limited to two terms. There are no Measure X passed in 2022 set term limits of 3 4 terms for council members. Not retroactive to existing members. See https://www.californiachoices.org/alameda-measure-x-2022 for the city council.

Oakland City Hall was evacuated after the 1989 Loma Prieta earthquake until US$80M seismic retrofit and hazard abatement work was complete in 1995. City offices had to be housed in leased space and other locations.

Jean Quan was elected mayor in November 2010, beating Don Perata and Rebecca Kaplan in the city's first ranked choice balloting. This new system is intended to increase voters' ability to choose preferred candidates, as they can combine ranked votes when several candidates are competing. Sheng Thao, the first Hmong American mayor of a major city in the United States, served from 2023 until her recall in 2024. Barbara Lee has served as mayor of Oakland since 2025.

Oakland is also part of Alameda County, for which the Government of Alameda County is defined and authorized under the California Constitution, California law, and the Charter of the County of Alameda. The County government provides countywide services such as elections and voter registration, law enforcement, jails, vital records, property records, tax collection, public health, and social services. The County government is primarily composed of the elected five-member Board of Supervisors, other elected offices including the Sheriff/Coroner, the District Attorney, Assessor, Auditor-Controller/County Clerk/Recorder, and Treasurer/Tax Collector, and numerous county departments and entities under the supervision of the County Administrator.

In the California State Legislature, Oakland is in the 9th senatorial district, represented by Democrat Tim Grayson, and is split between the 14th, 15th, and 18th Assembly districts, represented by Buffy Wicks, Anamarie Avila Farias, and Mia Bonta, respectively. In the United States House of Representatives, Oakland is in California's 12th congressional district, represented by Democrat Lateefah Simon.

=== Politics ===
Oakland was a Republican Party bastion from the 1860s to the 1950s, with positions expressed by the Republican-oriented Oakland Tribune newspaper. In the 1960s, the majority of voters began to favor liberal policies and the Democratic Party. Oakland has the second highest percentage of registered Democrats of any of the incorporated cities in Alameda County, with Berkeley coming in first.

The last Republican presidential candidate to receive at least one-third of vote in Oakland was Richard Nixon in 1972. Since then, the Republican percentage of the vote has generally declined in each successive election.

According to the California Secretary of State, as of February 10, 2019, Oakland has 245,111 registered voters. Of those, 159,771 (65.2%) are registered Democrats, 9,544 (3.9%) are registered Republicans, and 65,416 (26.7%) have declined to state a political party. Oakland is widely regarded as being one of the most liberal major cities in the nation. The Cook Partisan Voting Index of Congressional District 12, which includes Oakland and Berkeley, is D+40, making it the most Democratic congressional district in California and the fourth most Democratic district in the US.

On November 27, 2023, the City Council unanimously passed a resolution calling for a ceasefire in Israel's war on Hamas, after hearing more than 500 residents speak on the topic.

In 2024, Oakland voters recalled then-mayor Sheng Thao, becoming the first Oakland mayor to be recalled in the city's history. Thao was also indicted by the Department of Justice for bribery and other crimes.

=== Taxes ===
Oakland has the second highest sales tax rate in California, at 10.75%. The residential property tax rates in Oakland are also among the highest in California, at a median of 1.71%.

== Education ==
=== Primary and secondary education ===
The Oakland Unified School District (OUSD), which covers the city except for Sheffield Village, operates most of Oakland's public schools. Due to financial troubles and administrative failures, it was in receivership by the state of California from 2002 to 2008. As of 2015, the Oakland Unified School District includes 86 division-run schools and 32 charter schools; the district also manages several adult education programs. As of 2015 there are 48,181 K–12 students; among division-run schools, there are 4,600 plus employees.

OUSD test scores historically lag behind the rest of California, in particular due to a high proportion of English-language learners. Some individual schools have much better performance than the citywide average. As of 2013, for example, over half the students at Hillcrest Elementary School in the Montclair upper hills neighborhood performed at the "advanced" level in the English portion of the test, and students at Lincoln Elementary School in the Chinatown neighborhood performed at the "advanced" level in the math portion.

Oakland's three largest public high schools are Oakland High School, Oakland Technical High School, and Skyline High School. Other Oakland public high schools include Castlemont High School, Fremont High School, and McClymonds High School, briefly known as Castlemont Community of Small Schools, Fremont Federation of High Schools, and McClymonds Educational Complex, respectively.

Among charter schools in the district, North Oakland Community Charter School (NOCCS), an elementary and middle school, is one of the few public progressive schools in the country. Other charter schools include the Oakland Military Institute, Oakland School for the Arts, Bay Area Technology School, East Bay Innovation Academy, and Oakland Charter Academy.

There are several religious and secular private high schools, including The College Preparatory School, Head-Royce School, Bishop O'Dowd High School, Holy Names High School, St. Elizabeth High School and Oakland Hebrew Day School. Catholic schools in Oakland are operated by the Roman Catholic Diocese of Oakland also include eight K–8 schools (plus one in Piedmont on the Oakland city border). Northern Light School is a private nonprofit elementary and middle school. Bentley School is an Independent Co-educational K–12, college preparatory school on two campuses in Oakland and Lafayette, California.

==== Funding ====
In 2017, the Oakland Unified School District has received funding from the technology company Pandora in partnership with Little Kids Rock, towards expanding music education programs within the schools. The result from these donations has given teachers from 20 additional Oakland-area schools the ability to participate in an eight-hour professional development workshop, and receive music education instruction from Little Kids Rock. The donation includes providing new instruments, that will benefit over 2,000 Oakland students.

=== Colleges and universities ===
Accredited colleges and universities include:

- Peralta Community College District
  - Laney College
  - Merritt College
- California College of the Arts (formerly the California College of Arts and Crafts)
- Lincoln University
- Mills College (Julia Morgan School for Girls is a private middle school for girls housed on the campus)
- Patten University
- Samuel Merritt University (a health science college)

Oakland is also the home of the headquarters of the University of California system, the University of California Office of the President.

In 2001, the SFSU Oakland Multimedia Center was opened, allowing San Francisco State University to conduct classes near downtown Oakland. The Oakland Higher Education Consortium and the City of Oakland's Community and Economic Development Agency (CEDA) opened the Oakland Higher Education Center downtown in 2002 to provide "access to multiple higher education service providers within a shared urban facility". Member schools include primary user California State University, East Bay as well as Lincoln University, New College of California, Saint Mary's College of California, SFSU Multimedia Studies Program, UC Berkeley Extension, University of Phoenix and Peralta Community College District.

Additionally, some University of California System property is on the northern tip of Oakland. The University of California Botanical Garden is in Oakland.

== Media ==
Oakland is served by major television stations broadcasting primarily out of San Francisco and San Jose. The region's Fox O&O, KTVU 2, is based in (and licensed to) Oakland at Jack London Square along with co-owned MyNetworkTV outlet KICU-TV 36 (licensed to San Jose). In addition, the city is served by various AM and FM radio stations as well; AM stations KKSF 910, KMKY 1310 and KNEW 960 are licensed to Oakland.

Oakland was served by the Oakland Tribune, which published its first newspaper on February 21, 1874. The Tribune Tower, which features a large clock, is an Oakland landmark. At key times throughout the day (8:00 am, noon and 5:00 pm), the clock tower carillon plays a variety of classic melodies, which change daily. In 2007, the Oakland Tribune moved its offices from the tower to an East Oakland location. It was merged into the East Bay Times in 2016.

The East Bay Express, a locally owned free weekly paper, is based in Jack London Square and distributed throughout the East Bay.

Oaklandwiki is a thriving (mostly) English-language LocalWiki.

== Infrastructure ==
=== Transportation ===
==== Air and rail ====
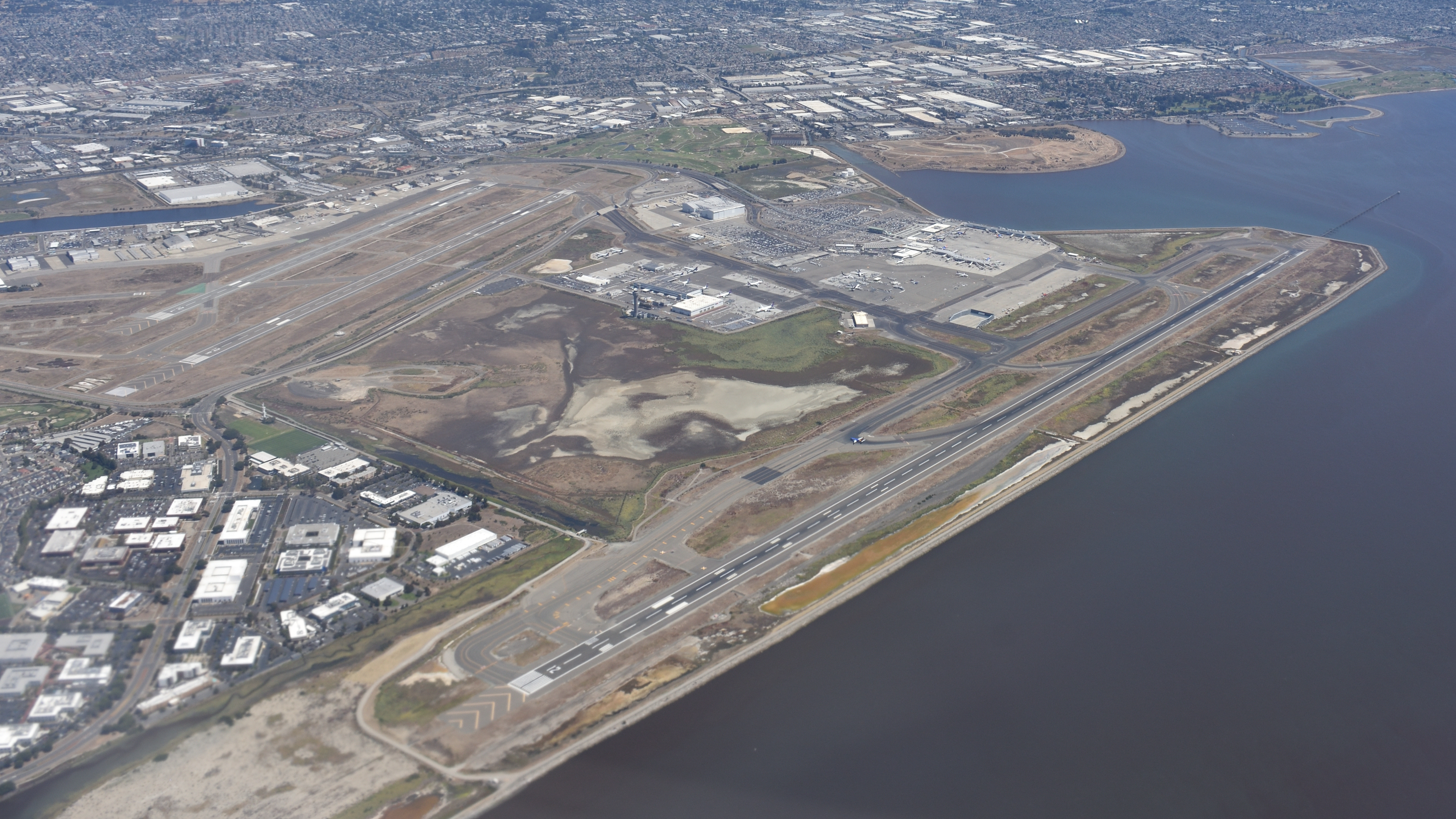
Oakland San Francisco Bay Airport

Oakland residents have access to the three major airports of the San Francisco Bay Area: Oakland San Francisco Bay Airport, San Francisco International Airport, and San Jose International Airport. Oakland San Francisco Bay Airport, within Oakland's city limits, is 4 mi (6.4 km) south of downtown Oakland and serves domestic and international destinations. AC Transit provides 24-hour service to the airport, and BART's Oakland Airport Connector automated guideway transit line provides frequent service between the airport and Oakland Coliseum station.

The city has regional and long-distance passenger train service provided by Amtrak, with stations near Jack London Square and the Oakland-Alameda County Coliseum. Amtrak's California Zephyr has its western terminus at the nearby Emeryville station.

Historically, the city was served by several train companies, which terminated in different terminals. Santa Fe trains terminated at its Oakland depot, actually located within the city limits of Emeryville at 40th and San Pablo. Southern Pacific trains ended at the 16th Street Station. Western Pacific trains ended at the 3rd and Washington station. However, a common feature was that the different railroads continued one more stop to a station at Oakland Pier. From this latter point passengers would ride ferries to San Francisco.

==== Mass transit and bicycling ====
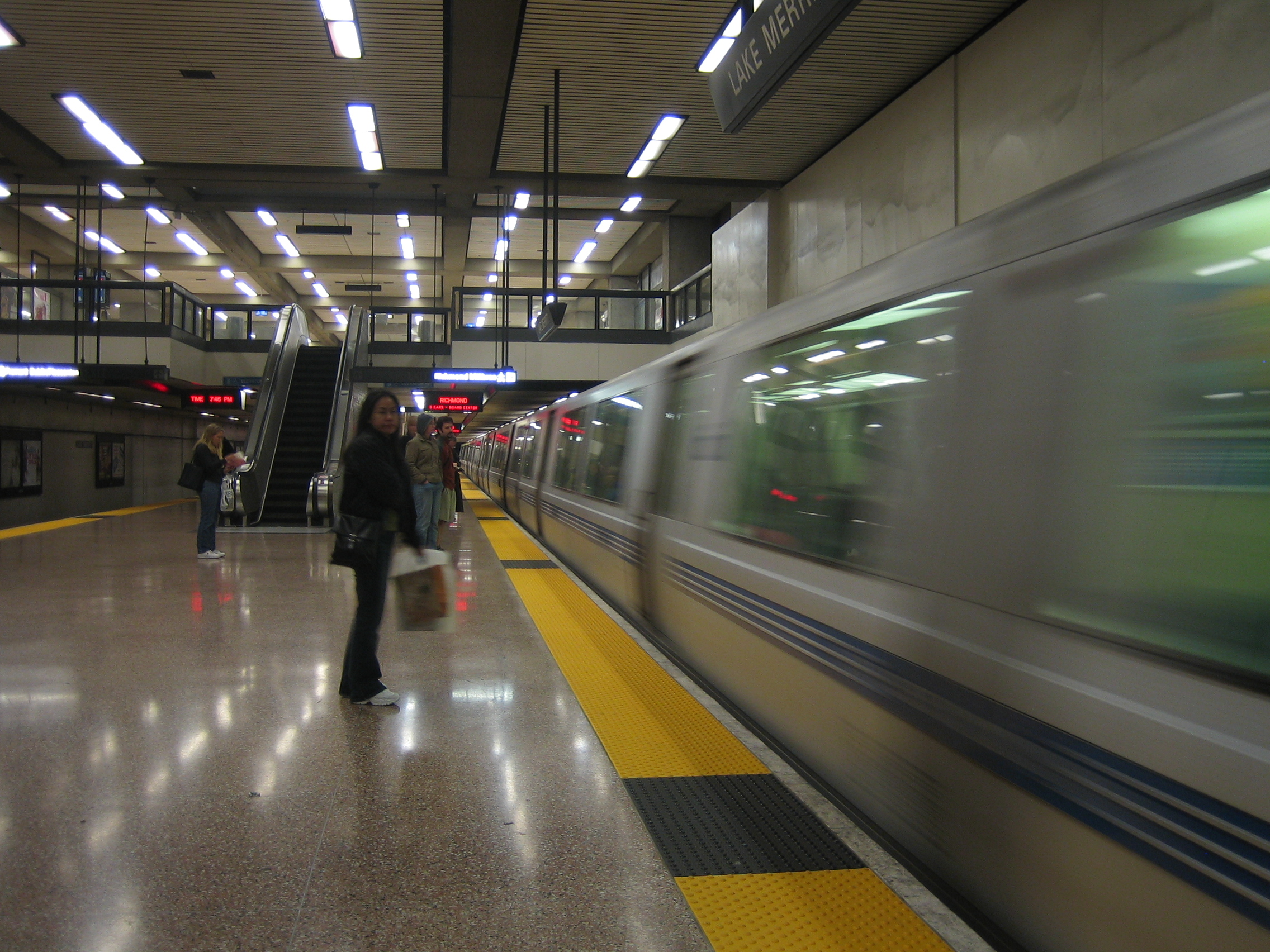
The Lake Merritt BART station

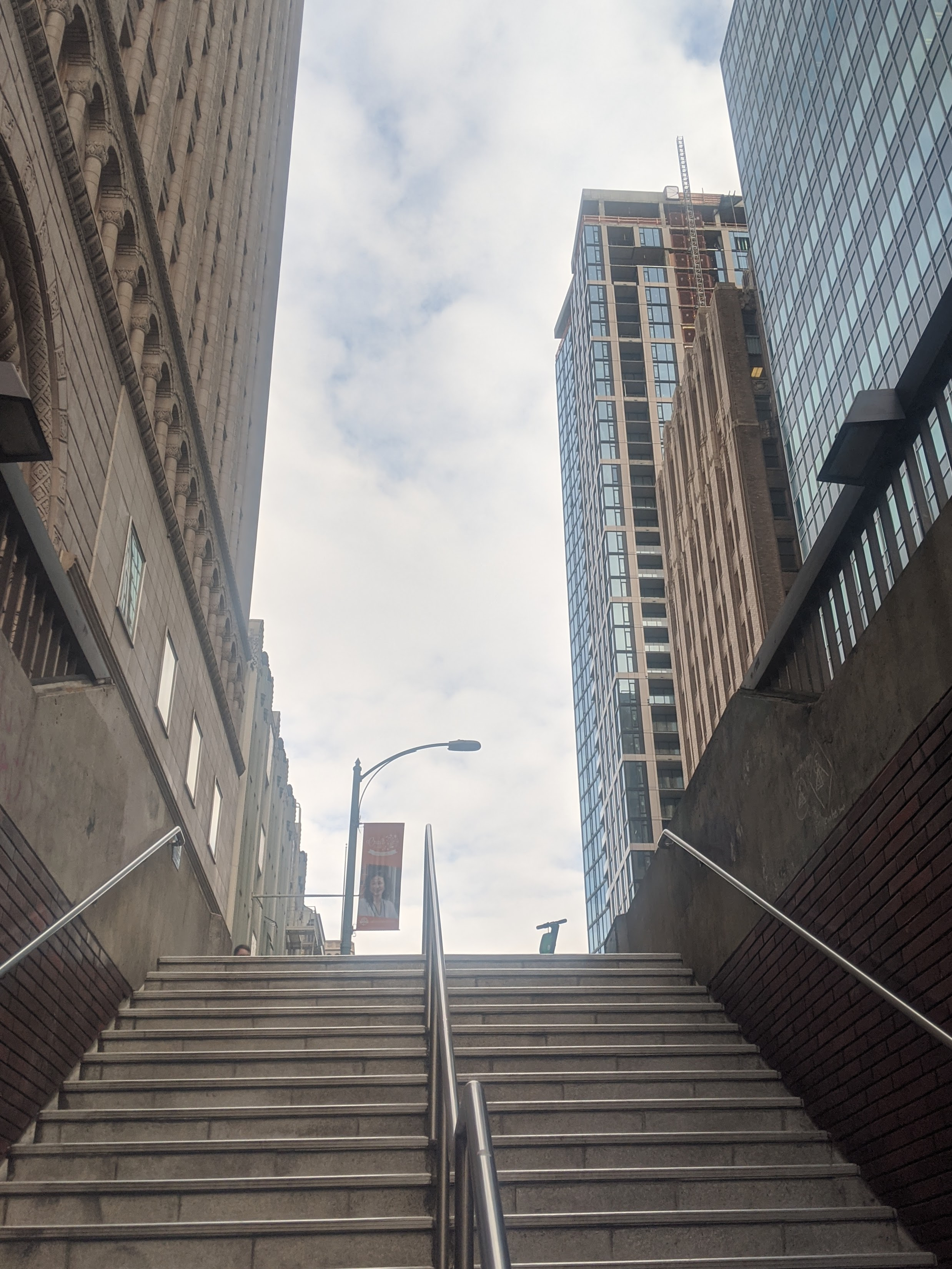
The 12th St. BART subway entrance leading to 14th St.

Data compiled in 2007 by the United States Census Bureau before gasoline price spikes in 2008, showed that 24.3% of Oaklanders used public transportation, walked or used "other means" to commute to work, not including remote work, with 17% of Oakland households being "car free" and/or statistically categorized as having "no vehicles available".

Bus transit service in Oakland and the inner East Bay is provided by the Alameda and Contra Costa Transit District, AC Transit. The district originated in 1958 after the conspiratorial dissolution of the Key System of streetcars. Many AC Transit lines follow old routes of the Key System. During COVID-19, AC Transit canceled many bus lines in Oakland, and never restored their service.

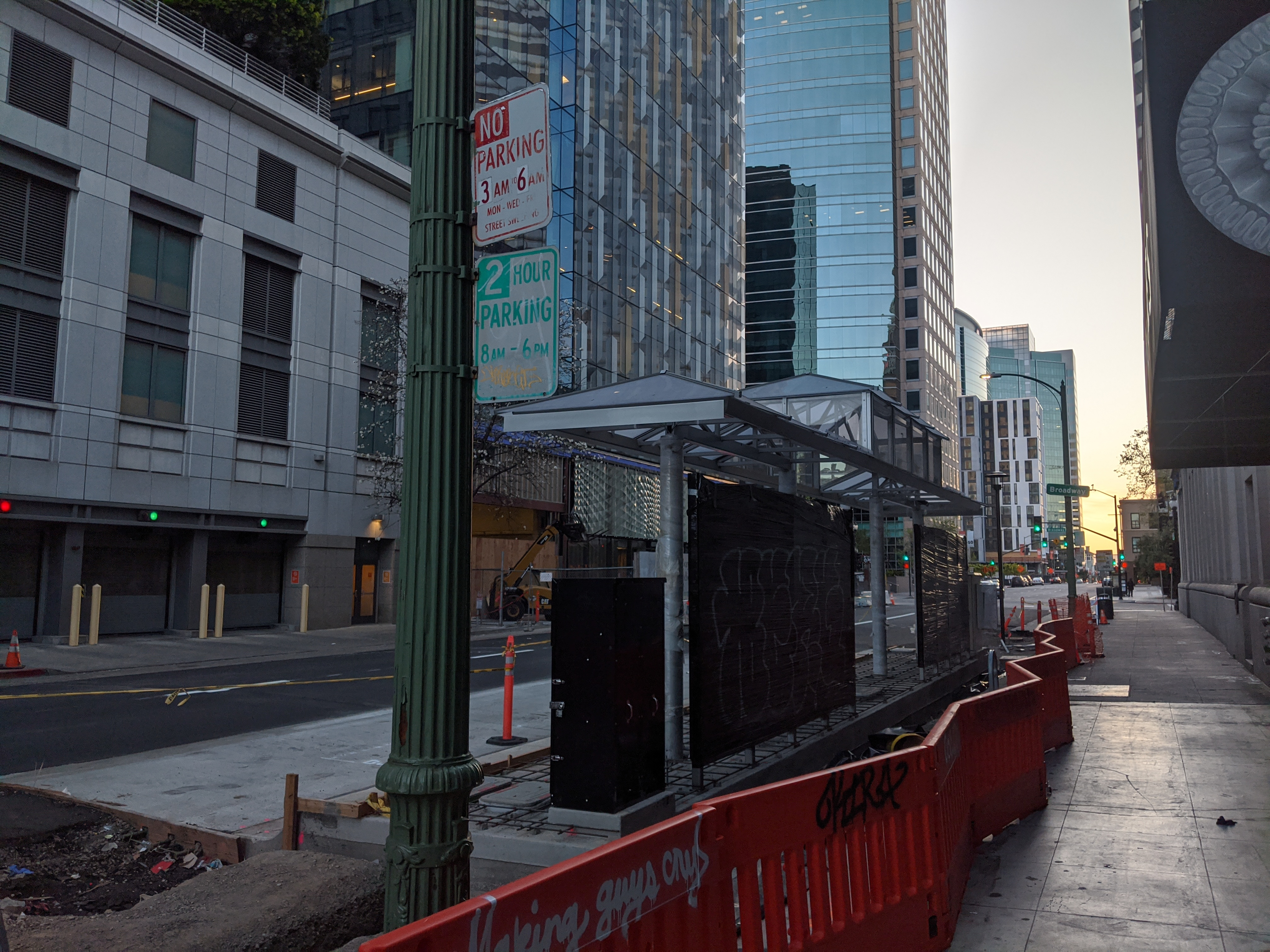
Construction of AC Transit's Westbound 12th St station

Intercity bus companies that serve Oakland include Greyhound, BoltBus, USAsia, and Hoang Transportation. Megabus no longer serves Oakland.

The metropolitan area is served by Bay Area Rapid Transit (BART) from eight stations in Oakland, served by all BART lines.The system has headquarters in Oakland, with major transfer hubs at MacArthur and 19th Street stations. BART's headquarters was in a building above the Lake Merritt BART station until 2006, when it relocated to the Kaiser Center due to seismic safety concerns.

The Alameda / Oakland Ferry operates ferry service from Jack London Square to Alameda, Oracle Park, Pier 41, the San Francisco Ferry Building, and the South San Francisco Ferry Terminal. Oakland licenses taxi cabs, and has zoned cab stands in its downtown, including a bicycle pedi-cab service.

The Oakland City Council adopted a Bicycle Master Plan in 1999 as a part of the Land Use and Transportation (LUTE) element of Oakland's 1998 General Plan. The creation of the plan was to promote alternatives to the private automobile. The Oakland City Council reaffirmed the bike plan in 2005, revised it in 2007, and reaffirmed it in 2012. From 1999 to 2007, the city installed 900 bike racks throughout Oakland, accommodating over 2,000 bicycles. By the end of 2017, over 160 bikeway miles and 9,900 bike parking spaces were constructed. Facilities for parking thousands of bicycles have been installed downtown and in other commercial districts throughout Oakland. According to the U.S. Census Bureau's 2011 American Community Survey, Oakland came in seventh place out of the 100 largest cities in the nation by percentage of people that chose to commute by bike in 2011.

==== Motorized scooters ====
In July 2019, the City of Oakland Department of Transportation announced that it had issued official permits for the deployment of shared e-scooters to four companies: Bird, Clevr, Lime, and Lyft. Oakland requires these operators to educate users on the correct and safe use of scooters, to distribute the scooters equitably throughout the city, to ensure accessibility, and to provide insurance and indemnification.

==== Bridges, freeways, and tunnels ====
Oakland is served by several major highways: Eastbound Bay Bridge traffic entering Oakland then splits into three freeways at the MacArthur Maze freeway interchange: Interstate 580 (MacArthur Freeway) heads southeast toward Hayward and eventually to the California Central Valley; Interstate 880 (Nimitz Freeway) runs south to San Jose; and the Eastshore Freeway (Interstate 80/I-580) runs north, providing connections to Sacramento and San Rafael, respectively. Interstate 980 (Williams Freeway) begins its eastbound journey at I-880 in Downtown Oakland before turning into State Route 24 (Grove Shafter Freeway) at I-580. State Route 13 begins as the Warren Freeway at I-580, and runs through a scenic valley in the Montclair District before entering Berkeley. A stub of a planned freeway was constructed at the High Street exit from the Nimitz Freeway, but that freeway extension plan was abandoned.

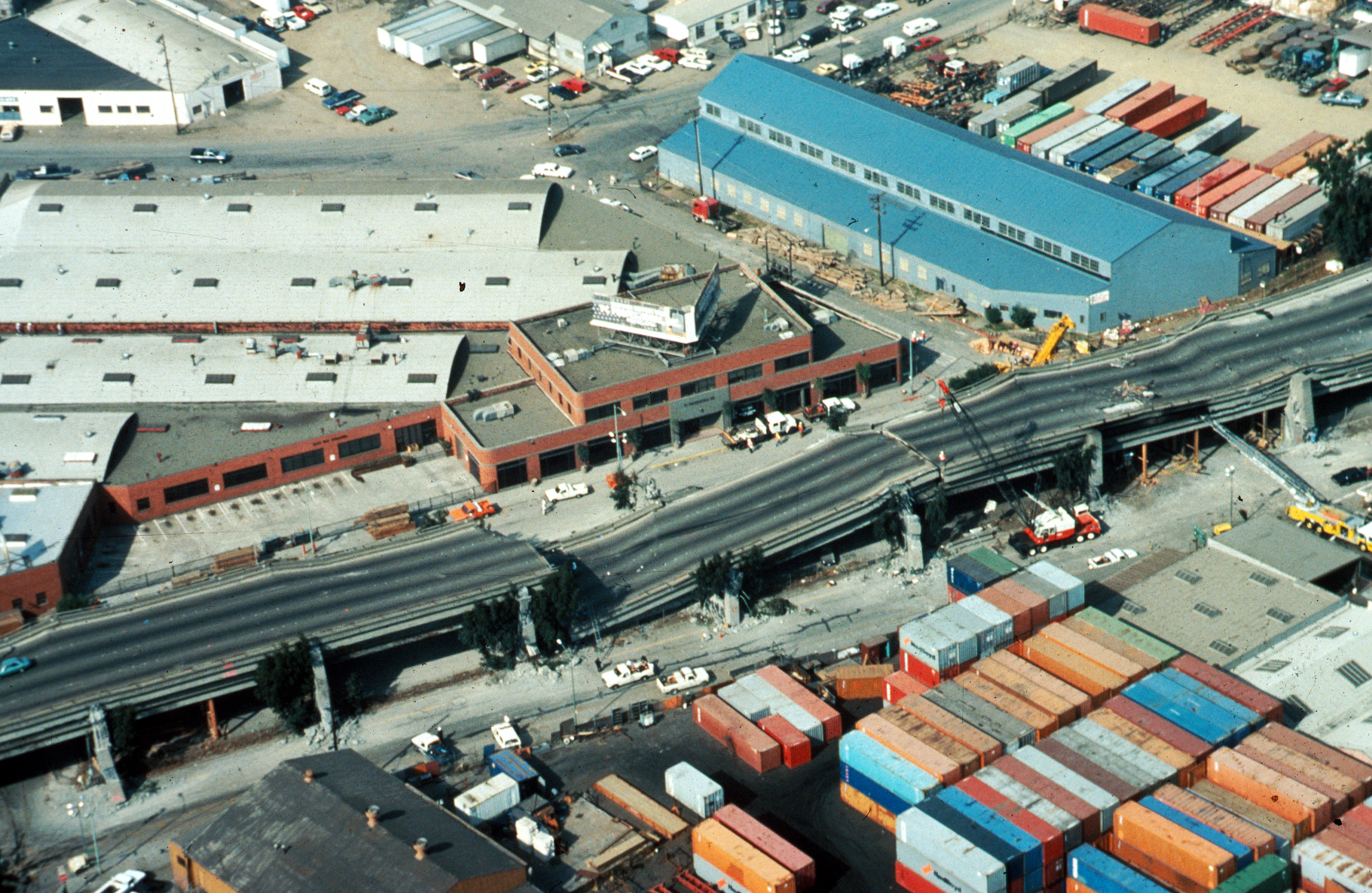
Portion of the collapsed Cypress Viaduct from the 1989 Loma Prieta Earthquake

At the time of the 1989 Loma Prieta earthquake, the Cypress Street Viaduct double-deck segment of the Nimitz Freeway collapsed, killing 42 people. The old freeway segment had passed through the middle of West Oakland, forming a barrier between West Oakland neighborhoods. Following the earthquake, this section was rerouted around the perimeter of West Oakland and rebuilt in 1997–2001. The east span of the San Francisco–Oakland Bay Bridge also suffered damage from the quake when a 50-foot (15-m) section of the upper deck collapsed onto the lower deck; the damaged section was repaired within a month of the earthquake. As a result of Loma Prieta, a significant seismic retrofit was performed on the western span of the Bay Bridge. The eastern span has now been replaced with a dramatic single-tower self-anchoring suspension span.

Two underwater tunnels, the Webster and Posey Tubes, connect the main island of Alameda to downtown Oakland, coming above ground in Chinatown. In addition, the Park Street, Fruitvale, and High Street bridges connect Alameda to East Oakland over the Oakland Estuary.

In the hills, the Leimert Bridge crosses Dimond Canyon, connecting the Oakmore neighborhood to Park Boulevard. The Caldecott Tunnel carries Highway 24 through the Berkeley Hills, connecting central Contra Costa County to Oakland. The Caldecott has four bores.

==== Oakland Slow Streets Program ====
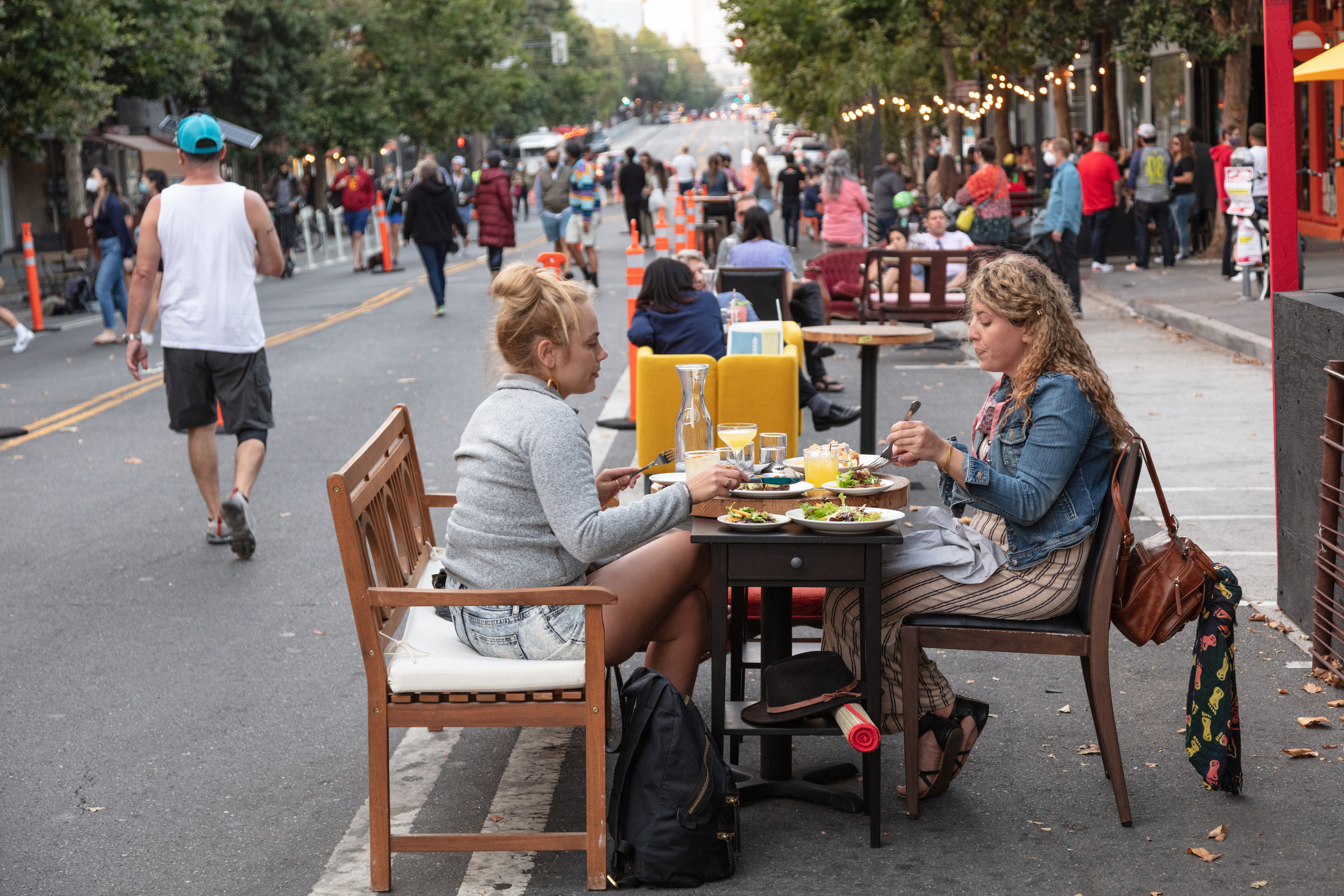
Part of the Slow Streets Program in September 2020

On April 11, 2020, the City of Oakland launched its Slow Streets Program. This was facilitated in part by the sudden decrease of vehicle traffic that resulted from the state-wide stay-at-home order and school closures in response to the spread of the COVID-19 in California. The goal of the program was to "support safe physical activity and alleviate overcrowding in parks and on trails by discouraging through traffic". This was accomplished by closing 74 miles of streets to through traffic.

Over the course of three months the city installed "soft closure" barriers consisting of signage, traffic cones, and barricades in over 21 miles of city streets. While the primary goal at the time was to encourage socially distanced outdoor physical activities like biking, walking, and jogging, the long term implementation of the Slow Streets Program contributed to the city's traffic calming measures and promoted alternatives to car use as well.

Although the Slow Streets Program was initially praised for its rapid implementation and prioritization of pedestrian safety, the Oakland Department of Transportation quickly came under fire for its failure to collect feedback that represented the opinions of the diverse range of residents whom the program affected. The high engagement with online surveys by wealthy white residents initially suggested an almost universally positive reaction to the program.

After the flaws of the feedback forms were brought to light, city planners made concentrated efforts to meet with representatives from different community groups who in turn stressed that simply closing streets to through traffic was not enough to protect pedestrians from dangerous driving. In response the city expressed its commitment to its local residents calling for road traffic safety by rolling out Slow Streets: Essential Places, a phase of the program which installed cones and signage at dangerous traffic areas in order to make grocery stores, COVID-19 test sites, and food distribution sites easily and safely accessible. By January 2022, all of the Slow Streets were removed, and road fatalities continued to be elevated above 2019 levels. No updates have been shared publicly by the city on any future Slow Streets improvements. In contrast, other cities, including San Francisco, kept and improved many of their Slow Streets.

=== Freight rail ===
Freight service, which consists primarily of moving shipping containers to and from the Port of Oakland, is provided today by Union Pacific Railroad (UP), and to a lesser extent by BNSF Railway (which now shares the tracks of the UP between Richmond and Oakland).

Historically, Oakland was served by several railroads. Besides the transcontinental line of the Southern Pacific, there was also the Santa Fe (whose Oakland terminal was actually in Emeryville), the Western Pacific Railroad (who built a pier adjacent to the SP's), and the Sacramento Northern Railroad (eventually absorbed by the Western Pacific, which in turn was absorbed by UP in 1983).

=== Shipping ===
As one of the three major ports on the West Coast of the United States, the Port of Oakland is the largest seaport on San Francisco Bay and the fifth busiest container port in the United States. It was one of the earliest seaports to switch to containerization and to intermodal container transfer, thereby displacing the Port of San Francisco, which never modernized its waterfront. One of the earlier limitations to growth was the inability to transfer containers to rail lines, all cranes historically operating between ocean vessels and trucks. In the 1980s, the Port of Oakland began the evaluation of development of an intermodal container transfer capability, i.e., facilities that now allow trans-loading of containers from vessels to either trucks or rail modes.

=== Utilities ===
Public water supply and sewage treatment are provided by East Bay Municipal Utility District (EBMUD). Pacific Gas and Electric Company (PG & E) provides natural gas and electricity service. Municipal garbage collection is franchised to Waste Management, Inc. Telecommunications and subscriber television services are provided by multiple private corporations and other service providers in accordance with the competitive objectives of the Telecommunications Act of 1996.

Oakland tops the list of the 50 largest US cities using electricity from renewable sources.

=== Healthcare ===
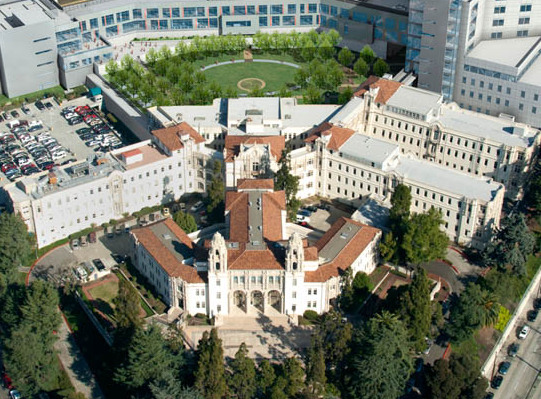
Highland Hospital

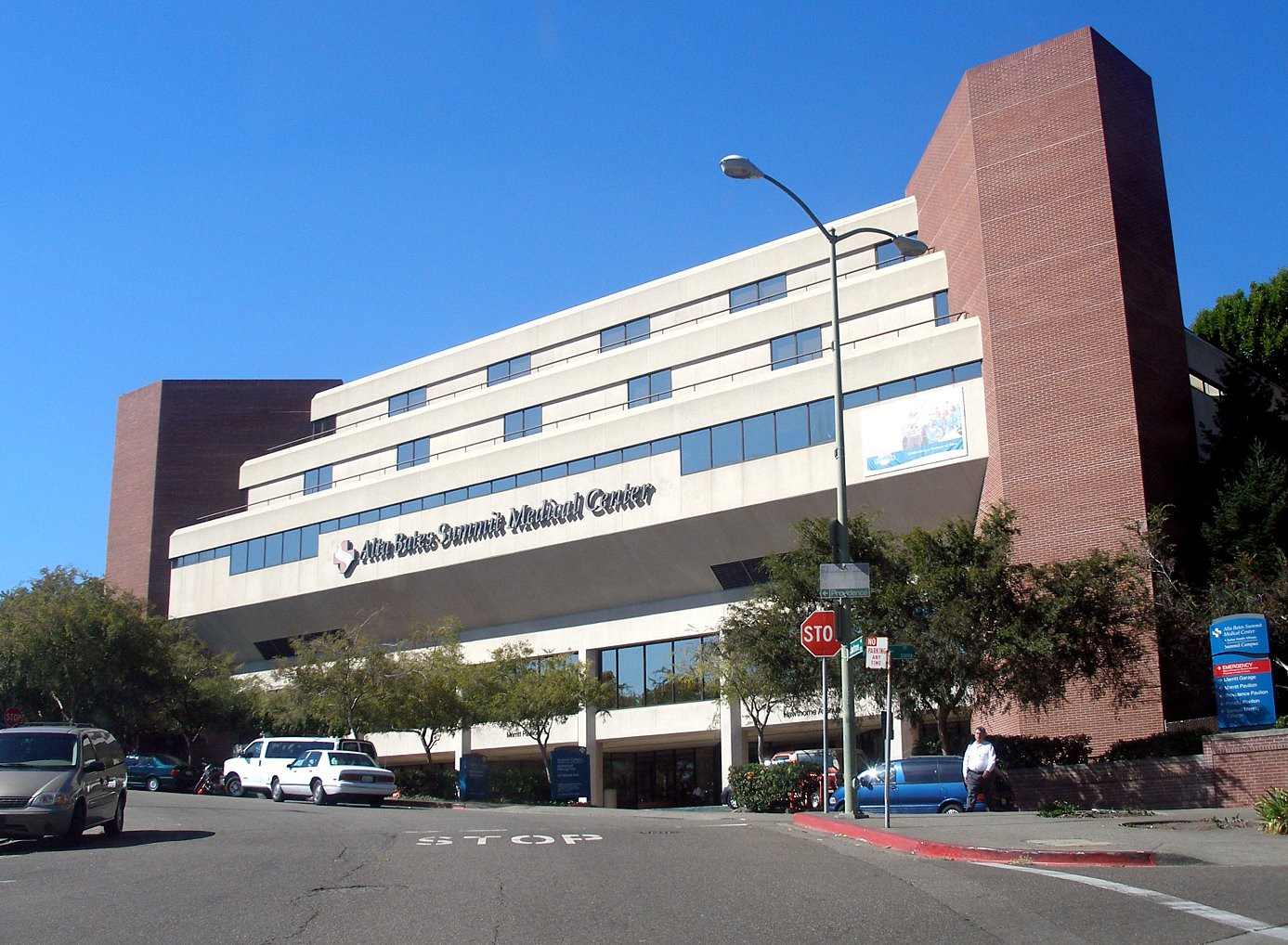
Alta Bates Summit Medical Center

Originating in Oakland, Kaiser Permanente is an HMO started in 1942, during World War II, by industrialist Henry J. Kaiser to provide medical care for Kaiser Shipyards workers. It is the largest managed care organization in the United States and the largest non-governmental health care provider in the world. It is headquartered at One Kaiser Plaza in Downtown Oakland and maintains a large medical center in the Piedmont Avenue neighborhood.

Alta Bates Summit Medical Center, an East Bay hospital system, maintains its Summit Campus in the neighborhood known as "Pill Hill" north of downtown. Until 2000, it was the Summit Medical Center before merging with Berkeley-based Alta Bates. All campuses now operate under the Sutter Health network.

Alameda Health System is an integrated public health care system organized as a public hospital authority. It operates five Alameda County hospitals including Oakland's Highland Hospital and four primary care medical clinics including Oakland's Highland Wellness Center and Eastmont Wellness Center.

UCSF Benioff Children's Hospital Oakland, formerly known as Children's Hospital Oakland, is the primary medical center specializing in pediatrics in the East Bay. It is a 191-bed designated Level I pediatric trauma center and affiliated with the UCSF School of Medicine.

There are also several community health centers in Oakland. Some examples include Lifelong Medical Care, Asian Health Services, and Roots Community Health Center.Notable people

== International relations ==
=== Sister cities ===
Oakland has 13 sister cities:

City	Division	Country	Year of Partnership
Fukuoka	Fukuoka Prefecture	Japan	1962
Sekondi-Takoradi	Western	Ghana	1975
Nakhodka	Primorsky Krai	Russia	1975
Dalian	Liaoning	China	1982
Funchal	Madeira	Portugal	1999
Santiago de Cuba	Santiago de Cuba	Cuba	2000
Da Nang	N/A	Vietnam	2005
Benin City	Edo	Nigeria	2010
Port-de-Paix	Nord-Ouest	Haiti	2011
Oakleigh	Victoria	Australia	2020
Foshan	Guangdong	China	
Bauchi	Bauchi	Nigeria	2010
Ocho Rios	St. Ann	Jamaica	1986

=== Friendship cities ===
Oakland has 18 friendship cities:

- Agadir, Morocco
- Bahir Dar, Ethiopia
- Changping District, Beijing, China
- Chengdu, Sichuan, China
- Guangzhou, Guangdong, China
- Haikou, Hainan, China
- Jing'an District, Shanghai, China
- Jinzhou, Liaoning, China
- Jurong, Jiangsu, China
- Maoming, Guangdong, China
- Mianyang, Sichuan, China
- Nanning, Guangxi, China
- Pudong, Shanghai, China
- Qingdao, Shandong, China
- Tanggu District, Tianjin, China
- Ulaanbaatar, Mongolia
- Weifang, Shandong, China

== See also ==
- Northern California Megaregion
- List of cities and towns in the San Francisco Bay Area
- List of tallest buildings in Oakland, California
- USS Oakland, 3 ships
- Oakland Buddha
