= White Mansion =

White Mansion may refer to:

- White Mansion (Copenhagen) or Moyel House, a historic building in Denmark
- White Mansion (Oakland, California), U.S., a historic house
- Hugh Lawson White Mansion, historic home of former Mississippi Governor Hugh L. White, in Columbia, Mississippi, U.S.
- "White Mansion", a song by Prince from Emancipation
- White Mansions, a 1978 American Civil War-themed country album
