= List of Oakland Designated Landmarks =

Oakland, California began a program of designating the city's historic landmarks and properties starting in 1973. Many of the properties have also received recognition at the federal level by inclusion on the National Register of Historic Places or by designation as National Historic Landmarks.

== Color markings (highest noted listing) ==
US National Register of Historic Places
California Historical Landmark
Oakland Designated Landmark
National Historic Landmark

== Oakland Designated Landmarks ==
# (Note: Numbers are as identified per ordinance. Blue colors represent designations as National Historic Landmarks and listing on the National Register of Historic Places; yellow represents sites that are Oakland Designated Landmarks. No color represents demolished monuments.)	Name	Image	Address	Date	Description
1	Western Pacific Depot		3rd & Washington Streets	July 9, 1974	
2	Camron-Stanford House		1426 Lakeside Drive	January 7, 1975	
3	Heinold's First and Last Chance Saloon		90 Jack London Square	January 7, 1975	
4	Tower to General John C. Fremont		Joaquin Miller Park	January 7, 1975	
5	Joaquin Miller Abbey		Joaquin Miller Park	January 7, 1975	
6	J. Mora Moss House		Mosswood Park	January 7, 1975	
7	Governor George C. Pardee House		672 11th Street	January 7, 1975	
8	Alfred H. Cohen House		1440 29th Avenue	January 7, 1975	
9	Paramount Theater		2025 Broadway	January 7, 1975	
10	Antonio Maria Peralta House		2465 34th Avenue	August 5, 1975	
11	Adobe Headquarters Site, Rancho San Antonio	Upload image	2465-2501-2511 34th Avenue	August 5, 1975	
12	Treadwell Hall		5212 Broadway	August 5, 1975	Formerly used by California College of Arts and Crafts
13	First Unitarian Church		685 14th Street	August 5, 1975	
14	Frederick B. Ginn House	Upload image	660 13th Street	August 5, 1975	
15	Tribune Tower		409-415 13th Street	May 4, 1976	
16	Herbert Hoover House	Upload image	1079 12th Street	October 5, 1976	
17	Jack London House	Upload image	1914 Foothill Blvd.	March 8, 1977	
18	Young Women's Christian Assoc. (YWCA)		1515 Webster Street	May 24, 1977	Now Common Webster and the Envision Academy of Arts & Technology
19	Lakeshore Highlands Portals	Upload image	Trestle Glen Road & Longridge Road	November 15, 1977	
20	Greek Orthodox Church of the Assumption		950 Castro Street	November 29, 1977	Original Location: 920 Brush Street
21	Quinn House	Upload image	1004-06 16th Street	March 21, 1978	Original Location: 1425 Castro Street
22	Arbor Villa Palm Trees		West side of 9th Avenue from E. 24th to E. 28th Streets, along Bayview Avenue and Park Blvd. to 9th Avenue	March 21, 1978	
23	Fox Theatre		1807-1829 Telegraph Avenue	March 28, 1978	
24	California Cotton Mills Company Factory		1091 Calcot Place	February 20, 1979	
25	Maclise Drug Store Building		1633 San Pablo Avenue	February 20, 1979	
26	Locke House		3911 Harrison Street	April 3, 1979	
27	Oakland Municipal Auditorium / Henry J. Kaiser Center		10 Tenth Street	April 3, 1979	
28	Oakland City Hall		1 Frank H. Ogawa Plaza	June 19, 1979	
29	St. Augustine's / Old Trinity Church		29th Street & Telegraph Avenue	December 4, 1979	
30	Earl Warren House		88 Vernon Street	December 4, 1979	
31	Oakland Hotel		13th St., Harrison St., 14th & Alice Streets	December 18, 1979	
32	Caldecott Tunnel		Highway 24	January 22, 1980	
33	North Field	Upload image	Metropolitan Oakland International Airport	February 5, 1980	
34	Montclair Fire House	Upload image	6226 Moraga Avenue	March 18, 1980	
35	Brooklyn Fire House	Upload image	1235 International Boulevard	April 8, 1980	
36	Point Oakland Fire House	Upload image	1681 8th Street	May 27, 1980	Burned in 1994 then demolished
37	Dunsmuir House and Carriage House		The Dunsmuir-Hellman Historic Estate 2960 Peralta Oaks Court	May 27, 1980	
38	Leona Park	Upload image	Old Survivor Redwood Tree		
39	Lake Merritt		Lake Merritt	July 8, 1980	
40	Leimert Bridge		Leimert Blvd. between Park Blvd. & Clemens Road	Sept. 30, 1980	
41	Glenview Branch Library	Upload image	4231 Park Boulevard	Sept. 30, 1980	February 25, 1997
42	Asa White House		604 East 17th Street	November 4, 1980	
43	Carnegie Libraries: (a) Golden Gate Branch (b) Melrose Branch (c) Temescal Branch (d) 23rd Avenue Branch		(a) 5606 San Pablo Avenue (b) 4805 Foothill Blvd. (c) 5205 Telegraph Avenue (d) 1441 Miller Avenue	November 4, 1980	
44	King's Daughters Home		3900 Broadway	November 4, 1980	
45	Morcom Rose Garden		Oakland-Piedmont line between Oakland Avenue and Jean Street	November 4, 1980	
46	Second Church of Christ Scientist Parks Chapel A.M.E. Church		476 34th Street	February 24, 1981	
47	James White House		Original Location: 702 11th Street Present Location: Preservation Park	April 14, 1981	
48	Charles S. Greene Library / African American Museum and Library at Oakland		659 14th Street	April 14, 1981	
49	Southern Pacific Mole		7th Street	April 14, 1981	
50	John C. McMullen House	Upload image	2748 Grande Vista Avenue	May 5, 1981	
51	George McCrea House and Indian Campground		Holy Names College Campus 3500 Mountain Blvd.	May 5, 1981	
52	Grand Lake Theater and Roof Sign		3200 Grand Avenue	July 14, 1981	
53	Dr. William Bamford House	Upload image	1235-9 East 15th Street	November 17, 1981	
54	James Presho House	Upload image	1806 10th Avenue	November 17, 1981	
55	Seymour C. Davisson House	Upload image	1527 Union Street	November 17, 1981	
56	DeFremery House	Upload image	1651 Adeline Street	November 17, 1981	
57	Capt. Henry E. Nichols House	Upload image	2304 9th Avenue	December 3, 1981	
58	Williams Block	Upload image	1148-1156 East 12th Street	July 20, 1982	
59	Central Block	Upload image	1102-1118 East 12th Street	July 20, 1982	
60	Portland Hotel - Henry House	Upload image	470-482 9th Street	November 9, 1982	
61	Dunns Block		721-725 Washington Street	November 9, 1982	
62	Peniel Mission (Oriental Block)		716-724 Washington Street	November 9, 1982	
63	Victor H. Metcalf House	Upload image	Original Location: 245 Perkins Street Present Location:750 14th Street		
64	LaSalle Hotel Building	Upload image	491-497 9th Street	November 9, 1982	
65	Central Pacific Railroad Depot (Mi Rancho)		464-468 7th Street	November 9, 1982	
66	Bowman B. Brown's Building & Annex	Upload image	727-73 Washington Street, 509-513 8th Street	November 9, 1982	
67	Hume-Wilcutt House	Upload image	918 18th Street	February 15, 1983	
68	Wilcox Block & Annex (Gladstone)	Upload image	821-833 Broadway, 459-475 9th Street	April 12, 1983	
69	Delger Block	Upload image	901-933 Broadway	April 12, 1983	
70	Cathedral Building		1615 Broadway	April 12, 1983	
71	Holland-Canning House	Upload image	954 16th Street		
72	Reed-Henshaw House	Upload image	974 16th Street	July 12, 1983	
73	Campbell House	Upload image	1014 16th Street	July 12, 1983	
74	Gladding-Chickering House		970 16th Street	July 12, 1983	
75	Cattaneo Block (Buon Gusto Bakery)		5006-5010 Telegraph Avenue	September 6, 1983	
76	Lloyd Hotel	Upload image	477-487 9th Street	November 8, 1983	
77	Arlington Hotel		484-494 9th Street	November 8, 1983	
78	Gooch Block (Ratto's International Grocery)		817-829 Washington Street		
79	Jefferson Square	Upload image	6th Street, 7th Street	December 20, 1983	
80	Lincoln Square (Oakland Square)	Upload image	10th St., 11th St., Harrison St., Alice St.	December 20, 1983	
81	Southern Pacific Railroad Station		16th and Wood Streets	January 31, 1984	
82	1100 Broadway Building		1100 Broadway	January 31, 1984	Key System Building
83	Church of St. James the Apostle & Parish Hall		1540 12th Avenue	May 29, 1984	
84	Brooklyn Presbyterian Church & Parish Hall		1433 12th Avenue	June 26, 1984	
85	Asian Resource Center		8th and Harrison Streets	October 16, 1984	
86	Latham Square Fountain		15th Street and Telegraph Avenue	October 16, 1984	
87	St. Joseph's Home for the Aged & Professional Center		2647 International Boulevard	November 13, 1984	
88	Howden Building		325-43 17th Street	November 13, 1984	
89	Financial Center Building	Upload image	405 14th Street	November 13, 1984	
90	Lafayette Square	Upload image	10th Street, 11th Street, Jefferson Street & Martin Luther King Jr. Way	January 8, 1985	
91	Mary R. Smith Trust Cottages: Initial Cottage	Upload image	23-27 Home Place West	April 23, 1985	
92	Mary R. Smith Trust Cottages: Grace Cottage	Upload image	1101-5 McKinley	April 23, 1985	
93	Mary R. Smith Trust Cottages: Evelyn Cottage	Upload image	3001 Park Boulevard	April 23, 1985	
94	Mary R. Smith Trust Cottages: The Lodge	Upload image		April 23, 1985	
95	USS Potomac		1660 Embarcadero	April 23, 1985	
96	Civic Center Post Office		201 13th Street	April 23, 1985	
97	Necklace of Lights		Lake Merritt	May 3, 1985	
98	Oakland Iron Works / United Iron Works	Upload image	2nd Street at Jefferson Street	July 16, 1985	
99	Oakland Technical High School		4500 Broadway	July 23, 1985	
100	Oakland Title Insurance Building		1449-1459 Franklin St./ 401-07 15th Street	July 30, 1985	
101	White Building	Upload image	327-349 15th Street/1464-1466 Webster Street	November 12, 1985	
102	Roos Brothers Building		1500-20 Broadway/448 15th Street	July 8, 1986	
103	Chryst House	Upload image	1600 Fernwood Drive	July 8, 1986	
104	Attached residences at 3034-3040 Richmond Blvd.	Upload image	3034-3040 Richmond Blvd.	July 8, 1986	
105	Tower House	Upload image	1937 8th Avenue	July 15, 1986	
106	Leamington Hotel Building & Annex		1800-26 Franklin Street/365-89 19th Street	April 7, 1987	
107	Western Market Building	Upload image	1483-87 8th Street/782 Chester Street	June 19, 1987	
108	Fricke Building	Upload image	565-7 11th Street	January 19, 1988 July 19, 1988	
109	Wetmore House Group	Upload image	571, 573-5-7 and 583 11th Street	January 19, 1988 July 19, 1988	
110	Posey Tube Portal		415 Harrison Street	June 23, 1992	
111	Ellen Kenna House	Upload image	1218 East 21st Street	June 23, 1992	
112	Lake Merritt Hotel	Upload image	1800 Madison Street	June 23, 1992	
113	Palace Apartments (Alison Apartments)	Upload image	1560 Alice Street	June 23, 1992	
114	Modern Safeway Stores Office & Warehouse Building	Upload image	5701-5759 International Boulevard	March 9, 1993	
115	Oakland Chinese Presbyterian Church & Annex	Upload image	265-73 8th Street	May 3, 1994	
116	St. Paul's Episcopal Church		114 Montecito Avenue	May 24, 1994	
117	University High School / North Oakland Senior Center		5714 Martin Luther King Jr. Way		
118	Temple Sinai		362 28th Street	December 13, 1994	
119	Oakland Museum of California		1000 Oak Street	February 7, 1995	
120	Borax Smith's Red House	Upload image	817 East 24th Street	June 6, 1995	
121	Alameda County Title Insurance Co. Building (Holland Building, Everis Building)		380-98 14th Street/1400-04 Franklin Street	June 6, 1995	
122	Joe & Rose Shoong House		385 Bellevue Avenue	December 5, 1995	
123	Charles & Lucretia Bates House		399 Bellevue Avenue	December 5, 1995	
124	John & Anna McElroy House		401 Lee Street	December 5, 1995	
125	Fire Station #10	Upload image	172 Santa Clara Avenue	December 5, 1995	including certain interior features
126	Our Savior Danish Lutheran Church (Seventh Avenue Missionary Baptist Church)	Upload image	1740 7th Avenue	January 23, 1996	
127	Oakland Laundry Company / Calou's Linen Service	Upload image	730-29th Street	January 23, 1996	
128	Walter "Brownie" McGhee House	Upload image	688 43rd Street	December 3, 1996	
129	Chapel of the Chimes		4499 Piedmont Avenue	March 30, 1999	
130	American Bag Company and Union Hide Company		299 3rd Street	March 30, 1999	
131	Cox Cadillac - Whole Foods		216-30 Bay Place/2500-42 Harrison Street		
132	The Rotunda		300 Frank H. Ogawa Plaza		
133	Claremont Hotel		41 Tunnel Road		
134	New St. Paul's Missionary Baptist Church (St. Paul's Swedish Lutheran Church)	Upload image	1011 Martin Luther King Jr. Way		
135	Victorian Legal Center, Law Offices of Warren B. Wilson (Mason-Elsey-Wilson House)		653 11th Street	May 18, 2004	
136	Samm/Dalton/Cooper House and Corner Store	Upload image	1450 - 1454 8th Street	May 18, 2004	
137	Broadway Building, First National Bank and Lionel Wilson Building		150 Frank H. Ogawa Plaza	June 7, 2005	
138	Malonga Casquelourd Center for the Arts (Women's City Club, Alice Arts Center)	Upload image	1428 Alice Street	June 7, 2005	
139	Municipal Boathouse (High Pressure Pumping Station #1)		1520 Lakeside Drive	June 7, 2005	
140	St. Andrew Missionary Baptist Church (St. Augustine's Mission)	Upload image	2624 West Street	June 7, 2005	
141	Studio One Art Center		365 45th Street	January 6, 2009	formerly Ladies' Relief Society Children's Home
142	The Altenheim Senior Housing		1720 MacArthur Blvd.	January 6, 2009	
143	Buddhist Church of Oakland	Upload image	825 Jackson Street		
144	Morse House	Upload image	5654 Margarido Drive		
145	Shorey House		1782 8th Street		

== Preservation Districts ==
#	Name	Image	Boundaries	Date	Description
1	Preservation Park		11th - 14th Streets Castro - Jefferson - Martin Luther King Jr. Way	August 12, 1975	
2	Victorian Row (Old Oakland)		7th - 10th Streets Broadway - Clay Street	April 13, 1976	
3	Preservation Park Extension	Upload image	10th - 13th Streets Castro - Jefferson - Martin Luther King Jr. Way	April 17, 1979	
4	Downtown Brooklyn-Clinton	Upload image	North side of E.12th St. between 11th & 12th Avenues	July 20, 1982	
5	10th Avenue Historic District	Upload image	1900 - 2100 blocks of 10th Avenue (portions)	May 3, 1988	
6	Bellevue Staten Apartment District		Portions of Bellevue, Elita & Staten Avenues adjoining Lakeside Park	January 14, 1997	
7	Oak Center Historic District	Upload image	Brush & Union Streets / 10th - 18th/20th Streets	July 15, 2003	
8	Sheffield Village Historic District		Roxbury, Marlow, Middleton, Covington, Brookfield, Danbury & 1810 - 1848 Foothill Boulevard	May 17, 2005	
9	7th Street Commercial District	Upload image	1600 - 1642 7th Street	May 17, 2005	

== Heritage properties ==
#	Description	District	Date	Description
1	1815 Leimert Boulevard	4	2007	
2	2302 17th Avenue	2	2008	
3	Shorey House 1782 8th Street	3	2008	
4	Fairlawn Hotel 2375 Fruitvale Avenue	5	2008	
5	227 John Street	1	2008	
6	Murdock House 3070 Richmond Boulevard	3	2008	
7	Oakland Consolidated Street Railway Car Barn 4629 Martin Luther King Jr. Way	1	2008	
8	609-611 22nd Street	3	2008	
9	Matteson House 2708 Sunset Avenue	5	2008	
10	2429 13th Avenue	2	2008	
11	5514 Picardy Drive	6	2008	
12	2451 Havenscourt Boulevard	6	2008	
13	614 Haddon Road	2	2008	
14	West Oakland Library, 712–716 Peralta Street	3	2009	
15	1676 12th Street	3	2009	
16	3415–3417 Martin Luther King Jr. Way	3	2009	
17	1717 16th Avenue	2	2009	
18	460 West MacArthur Boulevard	1	2009	
19	Pacific Furniture Fiber – Prevention Institute 221 Oak Street		2010	
20	2801 Harrison Street	3	2010	
21	1081 53rd Street	1	2010	
22	1926 Martin Luther King Jr. Way	3	2010	
23	2651 22nd Avenue	2	2010	
24	850 Trestle Glen Road	2	2011	
25	3627 Majestic Avenue	6	2012	
26	3635 Majestic Avenue	6	2012	
27	1550 5th Avenue	2	2012	
28	818 Trestle Glen Road	2	2012	
29	3054 Richmond Boulevard	3	2013	
30	851 Trestle Glen Road	2	2014	
31	80 9th Street	2	2014	
32	619 15th Street	3	2014	
33	856 Trestle Glen Road	2	2015	
34	51 8th Street	2	2015	
35	339 Palm Avenue	3	2015	
36	319 Henry Street	3	2015	
37	334 Newton Avenue	2	2015	
38	1902 Myrtle Street	3	2015	
39	523 41st Street	1	2016	
40	1824 Myrtle Street	3	2016	
41	1733 10th Street	3	2016	
42	The Alley, 3325 Grand Avenue	2	2016	
43	836 Trestle Glen Road	2	2017	
44	3130 Union Street	3	2017	
45	363 Cleveland Street	2	2017	
46	4690 Tompkins Avenue	4	2018	
47	528 28th Street	3	2018	
48	260 Park View Terrace	3	2018	
49	1255 Trestle Glen Road	2	2018	
50	581 Vernon Street	2	2018	
51	677 Longridge Road	2	2018	
52	1419 12th Street	3	2018	
53	2440 10th Street	2	2018	
54	418 Jefferson Street	3	2019	
55	6028 Broadway Terrace	1	2019	
56	6475 Colby Street	1	2019	
57	1263 Trestle Glen Road	2	2019	
58	619 Mariposa Avenue	2	2019	
59	2600 Best Avenue	6	2019	
60	678 18th Street	3	2019	
61	360 Van Buren Avenue	3	2019	
62	1000 Sunnyhills Road	2	2019	
63	412 Monte Vista Avenue	1	2019	
64	3007 Telegraph Avenue	3	2019	
65	Metropolitan Horseman's Association Clubhouse 10060 Skyline Boulevard	4	2019	
66	676 Longridge Road	2	2020	
67	322 (318–334) Broadway	3	2020	
68	1186 Trestle Glen Road	2	2020	
69	926 Rosemount Road	2	2020	
70	2804 Adeline Street	3	2020	
71	724 Campbell Street	3	2020	
72	326–328 Henry Street	3	2020	
73	5738 Picardy Drive	6	2020	
74	669-671 24th Street/674 23rd Street	3	2020	
75	369 MacArthur Boulevard	3	2020	

== See also ==
- California Historical Landmarks in Alameda County, California
- National Register of Historic Places listings in Alameda County
