= Greek Orthodox Church of the Assumption =

Historic church in California, United States

- U.S. National Register of Historic Places
- Oakland Designated Landmark
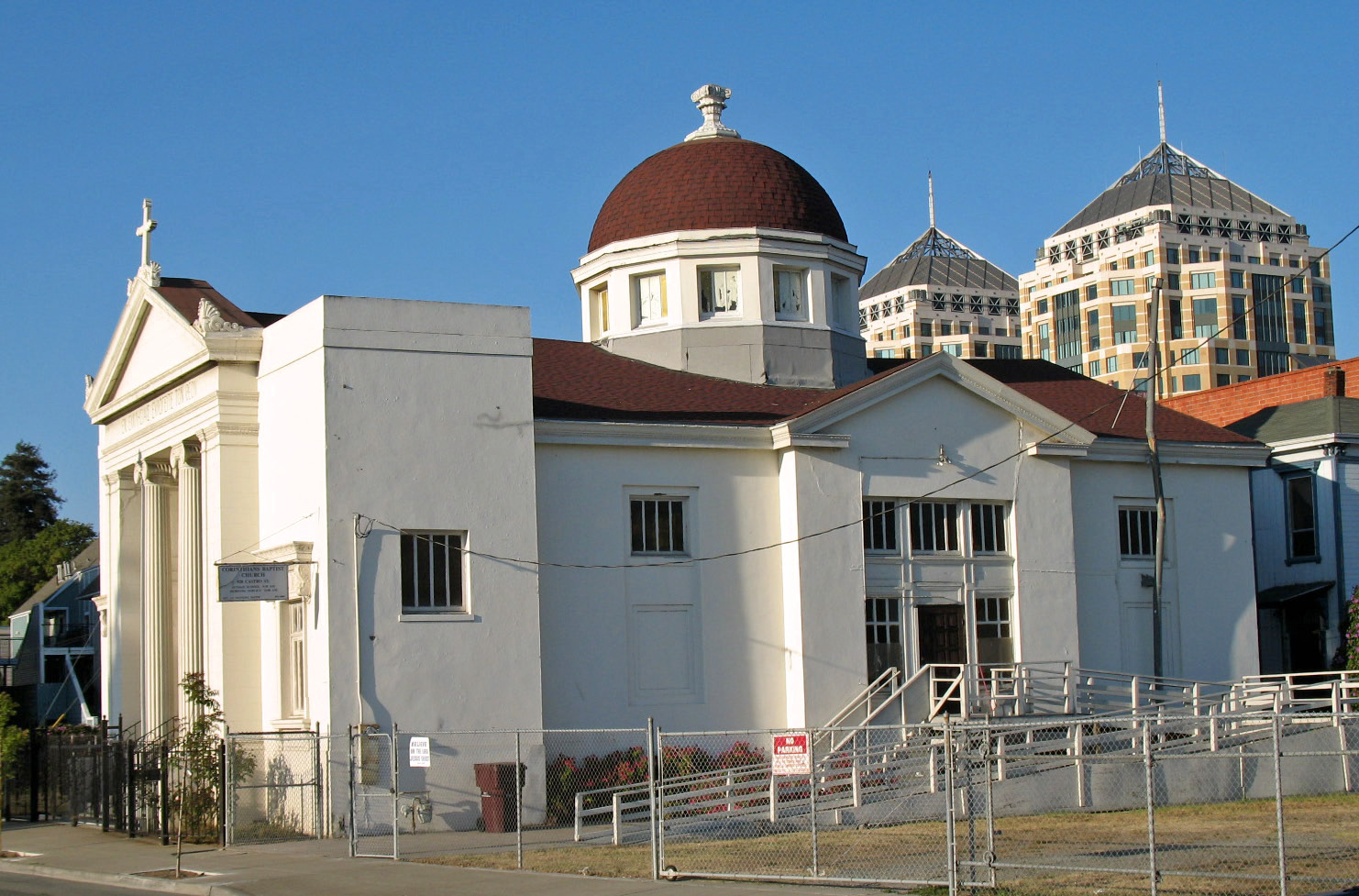

- Location within Oakland, California Location within California Location within the United States
- Location: 9th and Castro Sts., Oakland, California
- Coordinates: 37°48′15″N 122°16′43″W
- Area: less than one acre
- Built: 1920
- Built by: Palmer & Peterson
- Architect: Charles Burrell
- Architectural style: Beaux Arts
- NRHP reference No.: 78000651
- ODL No.: 20

Significant dates
- Added to NRHP: May 22, 1978
- Designated ODL: 1975

Corinthian Baptist Church, known as the Greek Orthodox Church of the Assumption in the National Register of Historic Places, is a historic church at 9th and Castro Streets in Oakland, California.

It was built in a Beaux Arts style and was added to the National Register in 1978. It no longer functions as a Greek Orthodox church, since 1977 it was sold and is now the home of the Corinthian Baptist Church.
