= Altenheim (Oakland, California) =

Historic place in Oakland, California

- U.S. National Register of Historic Places
- Oakland Designated Landmark
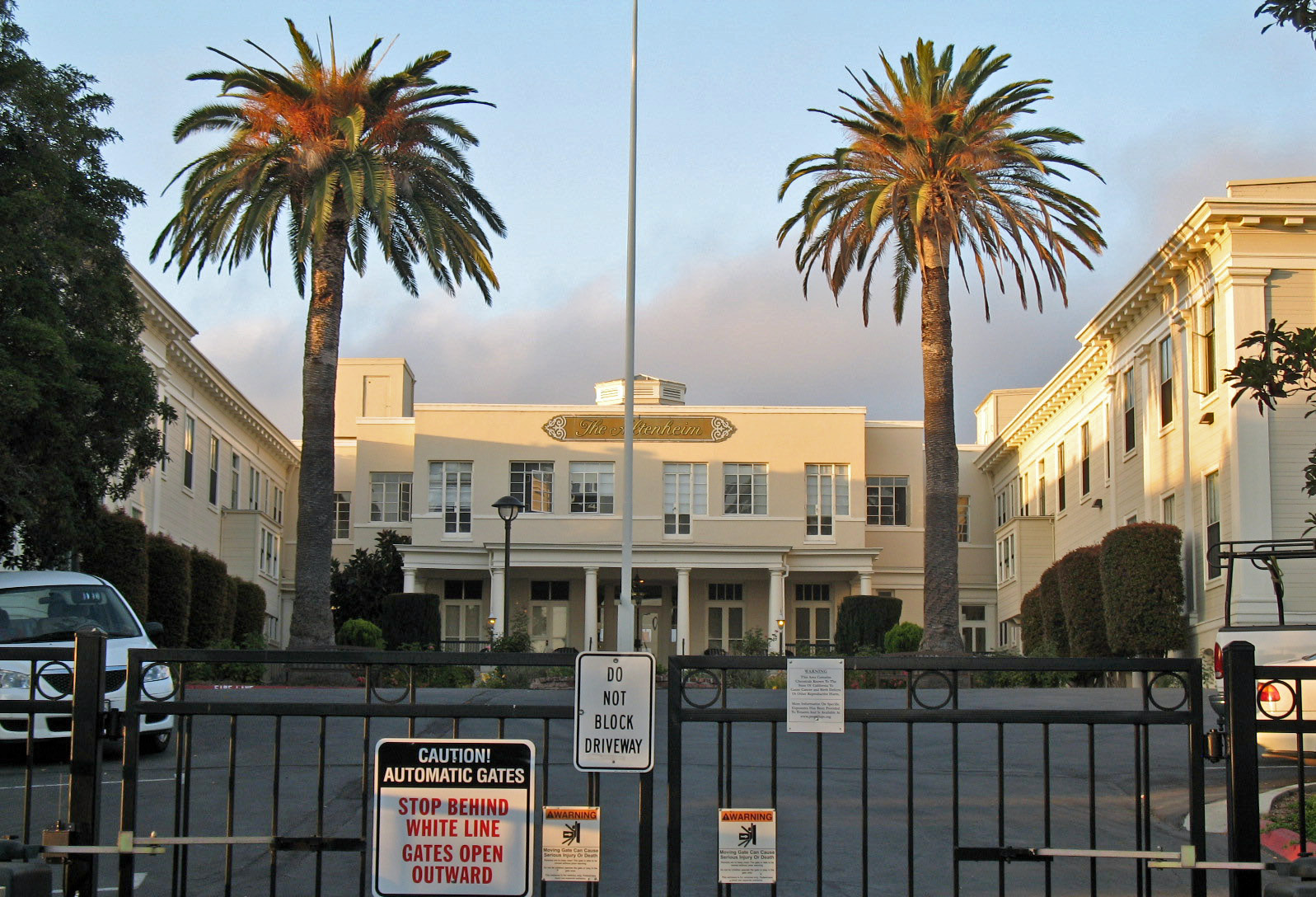
- Altenheim

- Location within Oakland, California Location within California Location within the United States
- Location: 1720 MacArthur Blvd., Oakland, California
- Coordinates: 37.800786°N 122.2208°W
- Area: 6 acres (2.4 ha)
- Built: 1908; 118 years ago
- Architects: Oscar Haupt and Robert Frost
- Architectural style: Colonial Revival and Classical Revival
- NRHP reference No.: 06001218
- ODL No.: 142

Significant dates
- Added to NRHP: January 10, 2007
- Designated ODL: 2009

Altenheim are historical buildings in Oakland, California. The Altenheim buildings were started in 1908. The buildings were listed to the National Register of Historic Places on January 10, 2007. The Altenheim is complex of buildings and gardens. There are three main buildings: The Altenheim buildings. the older part is from 1908 with a 1914 addition. The Excelsior building built in 1926, and the Boiler House built in 1914. The architects for the buildings were Oscar Haupt and Robert Frost. The Altenheim was built in the Classical Revival and Colonial Revival architecture. The site is currently the Altenheim senior citizen residence at 1720 MacArthur Blvd, Oakland. The Altenheim, (German for Elder’s Home or old people’s home), was founded by German speaking immigrants in the 1890s. The buildings have been modernized on the interior and won the Partners in Preservation Award from the Oakland Heritage Alliance in 2007. The original 1893 buildings, which were built by the Altenheim Society, were replaced with the current buildings after a fire.

== See also ==
- National Register of Historic Places listings in Alameda County, California
