= Ladies' Relief Society Children's Home =

Historic place in Oakland, California

- U.S. National Register of Historic Places
- California Historical Landmark
- Oakland Designated Landmark
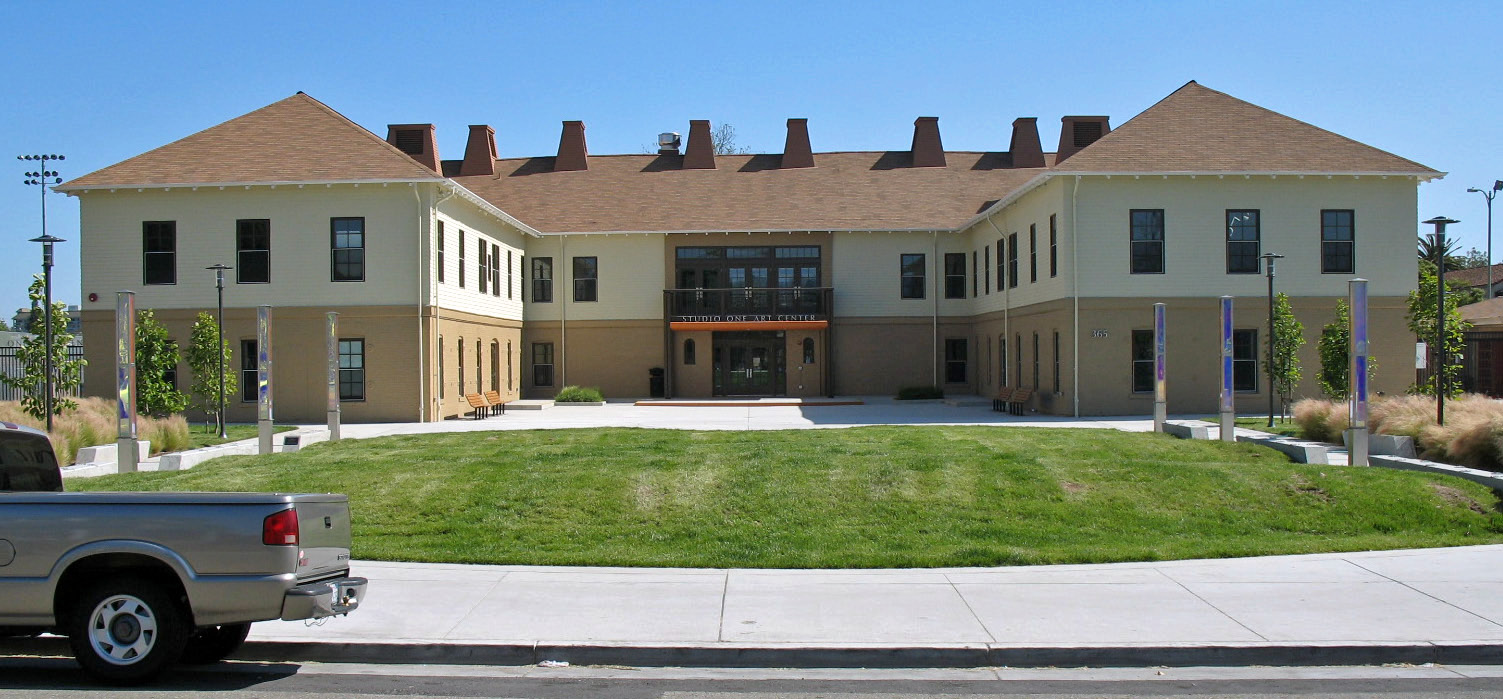
- Ladies' Relief Society Children's Home

- Location within Oakland, California Location within California Location within the United States
- Location: 365 45th Street, Oakland, California
- Coordinates: 37.832778°N 122.257222°W
- Built: 1907; 119 years ago
- Architect: Alphonso Herman Broad
- Architectural style: Wood shingle style
- NRHP reference No.: 06000612
- CHISL No.: N2328
- ODL No.: 141

Significant dates
- Added to NRHP: July 13, 2006
- Designated CHISL: July 13, 2006
- Designated ODL: January 6, 2009

Ladies' Relief Society Children's Home, is a historical building built in 1901, and located in the Temescal neighborhood in Oakland, California, U.S.. The three-story brick U-shaped building was listed on the National Register of Historic Places on July 13, 2006, under the name the "Ladies' Relief Society Children's Home". The building was also designated a California Historical Landmark on July 13, 2006; and an Oakland Designated Landmark (#141) on January 6, 2009. It has also gone by the names the Matilda E. Brown Ladies' Home Society, and Studio One Art Center.

== History ==
The current building was built in 1907, designed by Alphonso Herman Broad, replaced the 1872 building lost in fire in 1906. Ladies' Relief Society Children's Home was philanthropic group looking after the needy women and children in Oakland.

In 1956, Ladies' Relief Society Children's Home was renamed the Matilda E. Brown Ladies' Home Society. The Matilda E. Brown Ladies' Home Society closed in 1940. In 1941 the US Army leased the building for the World War II efforts. In 1947, the Matilda E. Brown Ladies' Home Society building and boys playground next to it, were purchased and donated to The City of Oakland and use as a recreation center.

In 2007 the building became home to the Studio One Art Center. In 2009 the Studio One Art Center renovations were completed to update the building.

== See also ==
- National Register of Historic Places listings in Alameda County, California
