= Alfred H. Cohen House =

Historic home in Oakland, California

- U.S. National Register of Historic Places
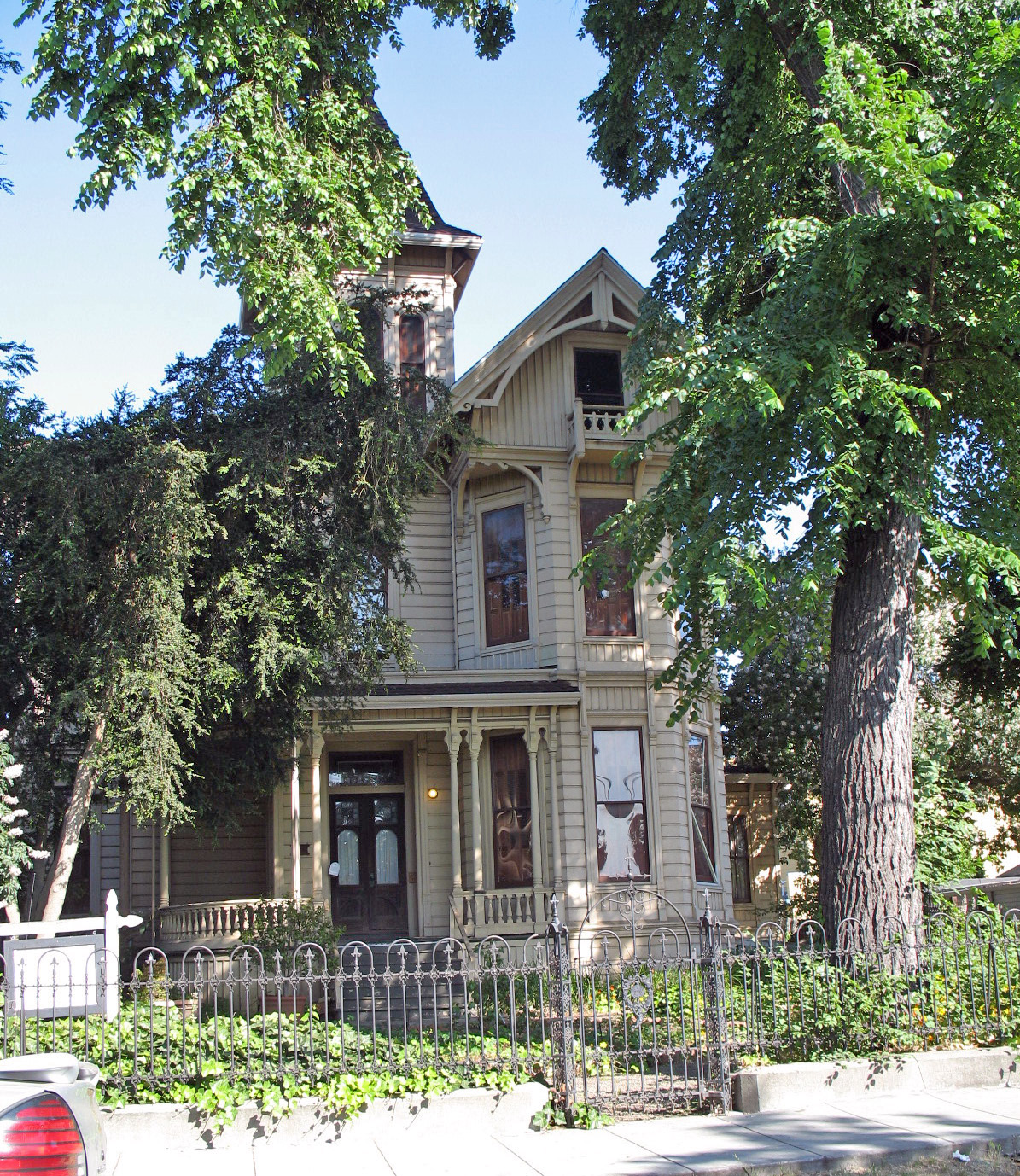
- Cohen House

- Location within Oakland, California Location within California
- Location: 1440 29th Ave., Oakland, California
- Coordinates: 37°46′47″N 122°13′36″W
- Area: 1 acre (0.40 ha)
- Built: 1881; 145 years ago
- Architectural style: Victorian architecture
- Website: www.cohenbrayhouse.org
- NRHP reference No.: 73000394
- Added to NRHP: June 19, 1973

Alfred H. Cohen House, also known as the Cohen Bray House, is a residence located in the Fruitvale neighborhood of Oakland, California. The house was originally part of the Peralta land grant, known as "Oak Tree Farm." The building was officially listed on the National Register of Historic Places on June 19, 1973, and placed on the List of Oakland Designated Landmarks.

== History ==
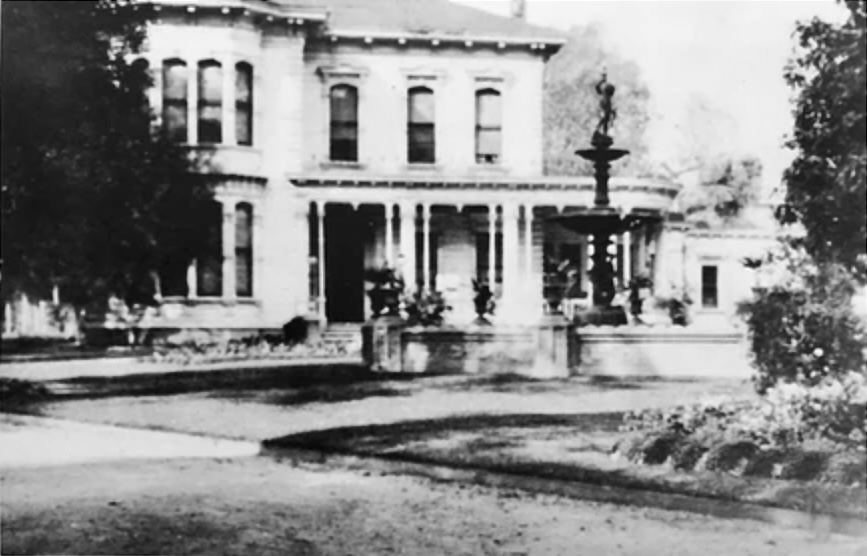
Cohen-Bray House in 1925

On July 6, 1854, Watson Augustus Bray and his brother John Grandid Bray purchased 200 acres (81 ha) of the Peralta Mexican land grant. They continued to buy acreage through 1863. On January 20, 1859, W.A. Bray built a home on this property, which they called "Oak Tree Farm" in the neighborhood of Fruitvale. Other families moved into the Fruitvale area and built large homes. Bray and his wife, Julia A. Moses, had a daughter Emma Bray who married Alfred Henry Cohen on February 28, 1884, at her parents home in Fruitvale. For her wedding present, her parents built her a seventeen-room house, now called the Alfred H. Cohen House, also known as the Cohen Bray House nearby. They resided in the house the remainder of their lives. They had four children. One child, Edith Emelita Cohen lived in the house that her mother bequeathed her. In 1918, a third child, Marion Cohen, remodeled the carriage house, and moved it to the front of the estate, north of the main house.

The property encompasses a plot of land covering approximately 1 acre (0.40 ha). The residence is the sole remaining portion of the Oak Tree Farm property, which once spanned more than 200 acres (81 ha).

== Design ==
The house is of the Stick or Queen Anne Victorian-style, which was the fashion from about 1870 until 1885. The two-story wood-frame house, has a third-story attic with a water tank, supported by a 4 ft (1.2 m)-high base and brick foundation. A 6.5 ft (2.0 m)-wide front porch wraps around the entrance, with a pair of columns with capitals that reflect a Moorish-influence, and brackets that support the cornice. The columns are set on a bulustrade with turned balusters standing 2.6 ft (0.79 m) high. The reconstructed front steps feature simple wood railings.

The main parlor wing extends to the porch depth in an octagonal form, extending through the second floor and capped by a gable upheld by corner brackets. Open bargeboards resembling wishbones provide support for the gable's cornice. Similar octagonal and square wings project from the southern and northern elevations.

The interior of the house has a front parlor, library, dining room, large living room. The house has custom made woodwork, using red mahogany and redwood. There is a front and rear staircase, along with a third staircase leading to the third floor. Upstairs The house comprises five bedrooms and two baths. Electricity was installed in around 1907.

The descendants of Emma and Alfred have established a foundation where their home functions as a study center for late 19th-century decorative arts.

== Historical significance ==
Alfred H. Cohen House is in its original condition, unchanged, retaining its original furnishings. It was listed on the National Register of Historic Places on June 19, 1973, and on the List of Oakland Designated Landmarks for Oakland, California.

== See also ==
- National Register of Historic Places listings in Alameda County, California
