= Dunns Block =

Historic building in Oakland, California

- U.S. National Register of Historic Places
- Oakland Designated Landmark
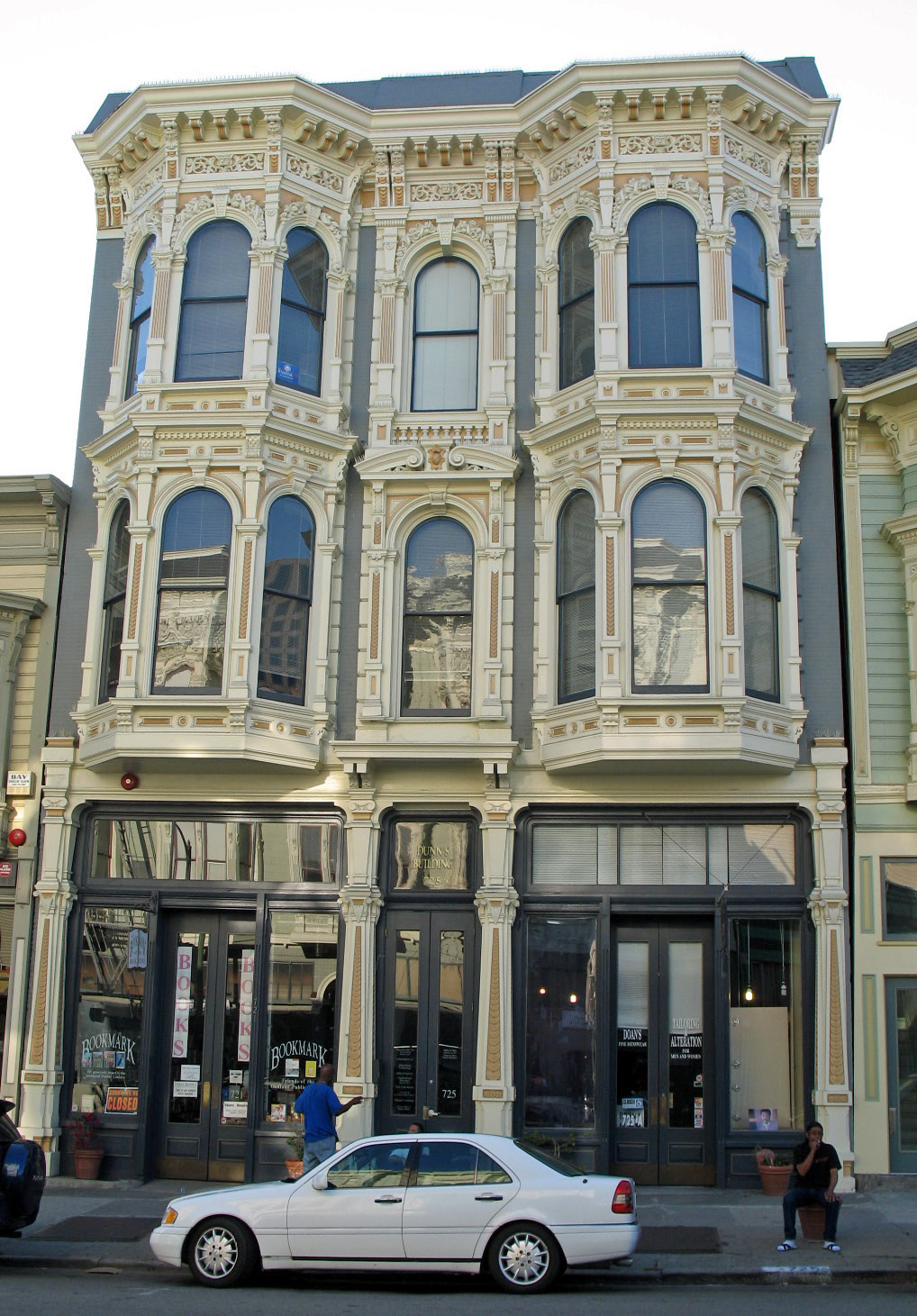
- Dunns Block

- Location within Oakland, California Location within California Location within the United States
- Location: 725 Washington St., Oakland, California
- Coordinates: 37.800556°N 122.275556°W
- Built: 1879; 147 years ago
- Architect: William Stokes
- NRHP reference No.: 78000652
- ODL No.: 61

Significant dates
- Added to NRHP: November 15, 1978
- Designated ODL: 1982

Dunns Block is a historical building in Oakland, California. The Dunns Block was built in 1879. The building was listed on the National Register of Historic Places on November 15, 1978. The Dunns Block building is at 725 Washington Street, Oakland. Dunns Block was designed by William Stokes (1833–1901). T Stokes also designed the Henry House-Portland Hotel on Ninth Street and in 1879 the Hall of Records. The building has been: MJB Coffee Shop, a book store and a tailor shop. The City of Oakland listed Dunns Block as Oakland Landmark #16, #LM 82–264 on November 9, 1982.

== See also ==
- National Register of Historic Places listings in Alameda County, California
