= Morcom Rose Garden =

Park in California, United States

Coordinates: 37°49′11.0424″N 122°14′49.19″W

Designations

Oakland Designated Landmark
- Designated: 1980
- Reference no.: 45

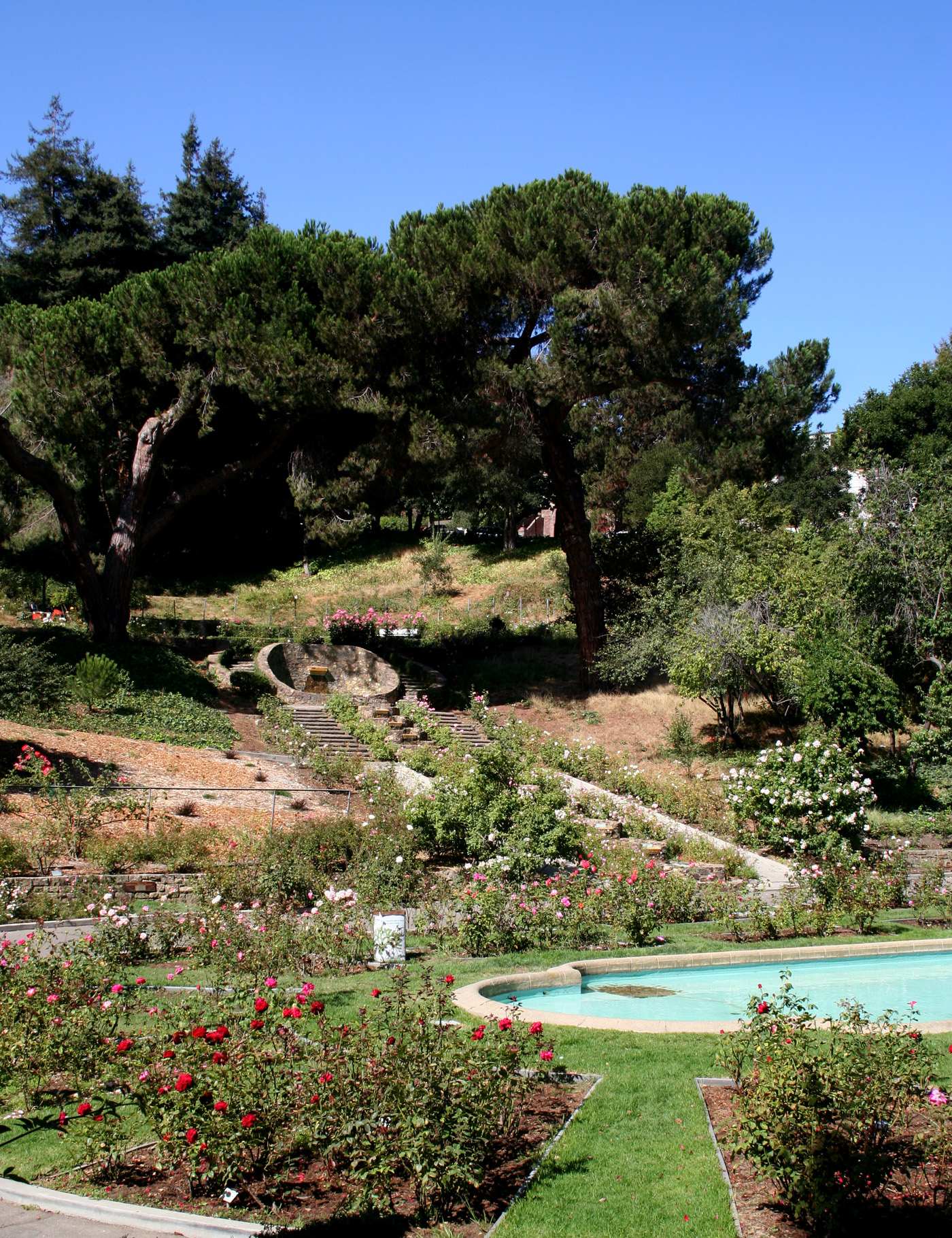
Central reflecting pool and cascade of steps

The Morcom Rose Garden (formerly the Morcom Amphitheater of Roses) is located in a residential neighborhood (the Rose Garden neighborhood) in Oakland, California, near the Piedmont border. The street address is 700 Jean St., Oakland, CA 94610.

== Initial development ==
The site of the rose garden was originally a regular public park named Linda Vista Park, opened in 1915. The conversion to a rose garden began as a project of the Oakland Businessmen's Garden Club in 1930, and the main force behind it (and the later Berkeley Rose Garden) was Dr. Charles Vernon Covell, a dentist and member of the Garden Club. Initially the garden was named the Oakland Municipal Rose Garden and the project was covered in the local press.

Rose Park to Be Built at Linda Vista

Announcement has been made that Oakland is to have a Rose Park, a composite of the famous gardens of Italy, and that its site is to be the Linda Vista Park. The project was sponsored by the Business Men's Garden Club, and has the support of the city government, which will carry out the work through its park department, according to the plans of Arthur Cobbledick, landscape architect. Work has commenced on the first unit, at once affording employment, and providing a new link in Oakland's chain of municipal parks.

— Oakland Tribune, June 5, 1932, page B-7

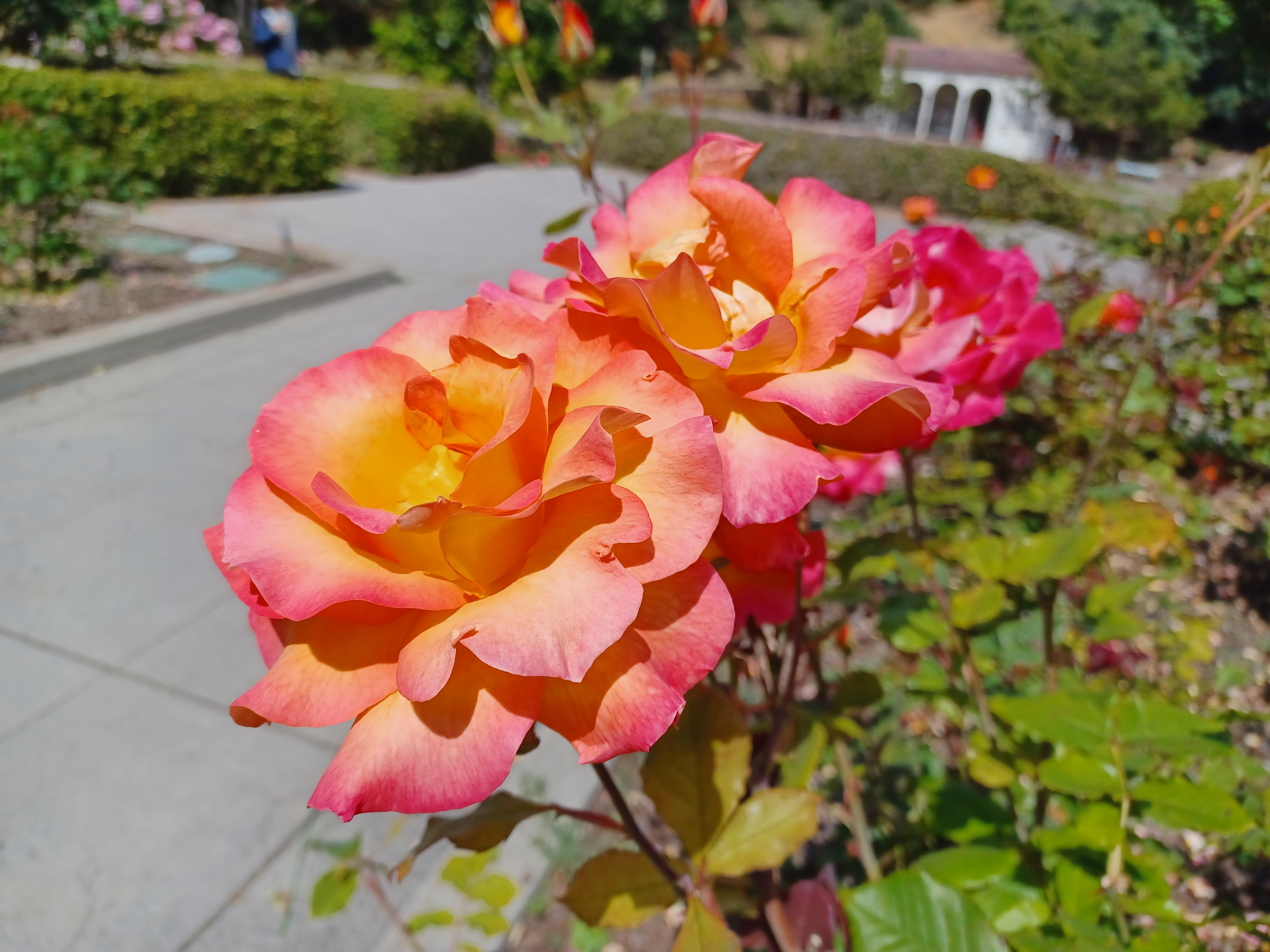
Roses at Morcom Rose Garden

The New Deal played a vital role in building the rose garden, but it was not the Works Progress Administration (WPA) that did the work. Instead, help came from the State Employment Relief Administration (SERA), which completed the garden in 1934–1935 (before the WPA was enacted). SERA was funded by the Federal Emergency Relief Administration (FERA).

== Garden layout ==
As well as thousands of roses, the garden has winding walkways, a reflecting pool, and a cascading fountain. The garden is available for weddings by making a reservation with the City of Oakland and can hold up to 200 people.

The garden is in a natural bowl in the foothills of Oakland, a ← site purchased by the city in 1915 as Linda Vista Park. The design is by Arthur Cobbledick, a member of the Garden Club, who laid out a formal plan inspired by the gardens of Italy.

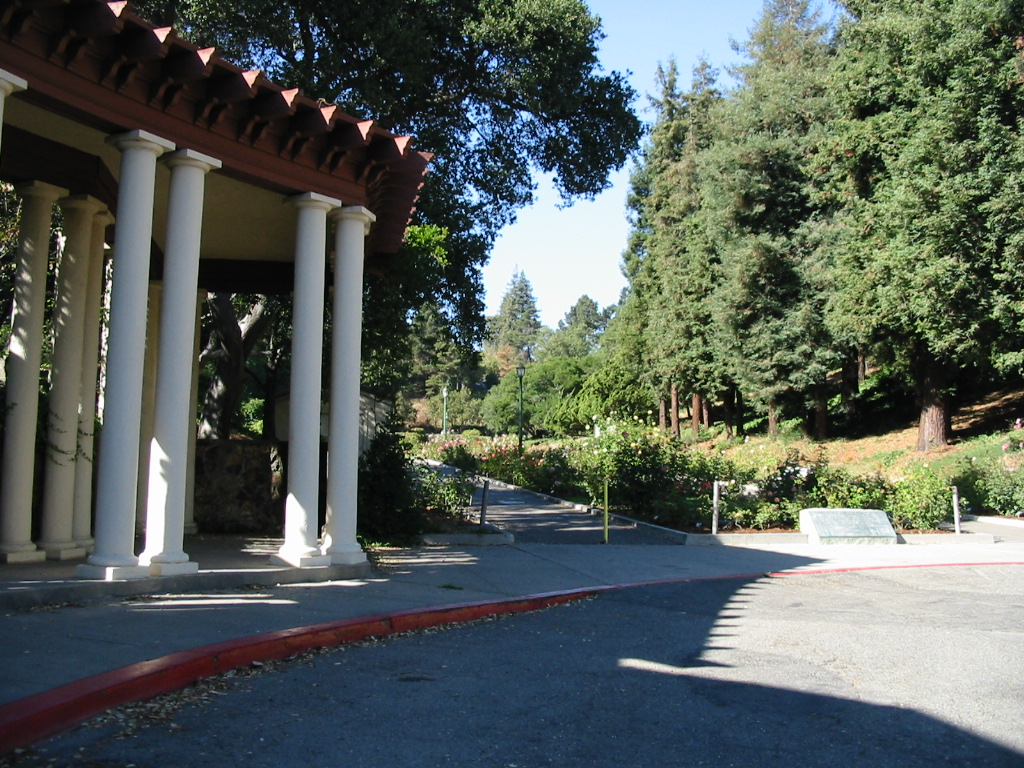
Main entrance with pergola and central walkway

The garden has three sections. The Jean Street entrance on the south end welcomes visitors with a classical curved colonnade, backed by stone walls, and a rose-lined walkway, flanked by a small service building.

The middle section features a reflecting pool encircled by rose beds and an elegant, 14-step cascade down the hillside to the west. Above the cascade is an octagonal wedding terrace in stone and more rose beds. Facing the pool and cascade from the east is a Mediterranean style loggia, which serves as an office and storage space.

A large Florentine oval garden at the north end has terraced flower beds rising on all sides, held in place by elegant rock walls. Access is possible from every direction by stone stairways, and path wend their way among the trees above the garden.

A renovation in the early 2000s created "The Mother's Walk," from the reflecting pool to the Florentine, with brass plaques in the ground with the names of women honored each year in an annual ceremony for Mothers Day. The tradition began in 1954 and has wooden placeholders for much of the 21st century.

== History ==
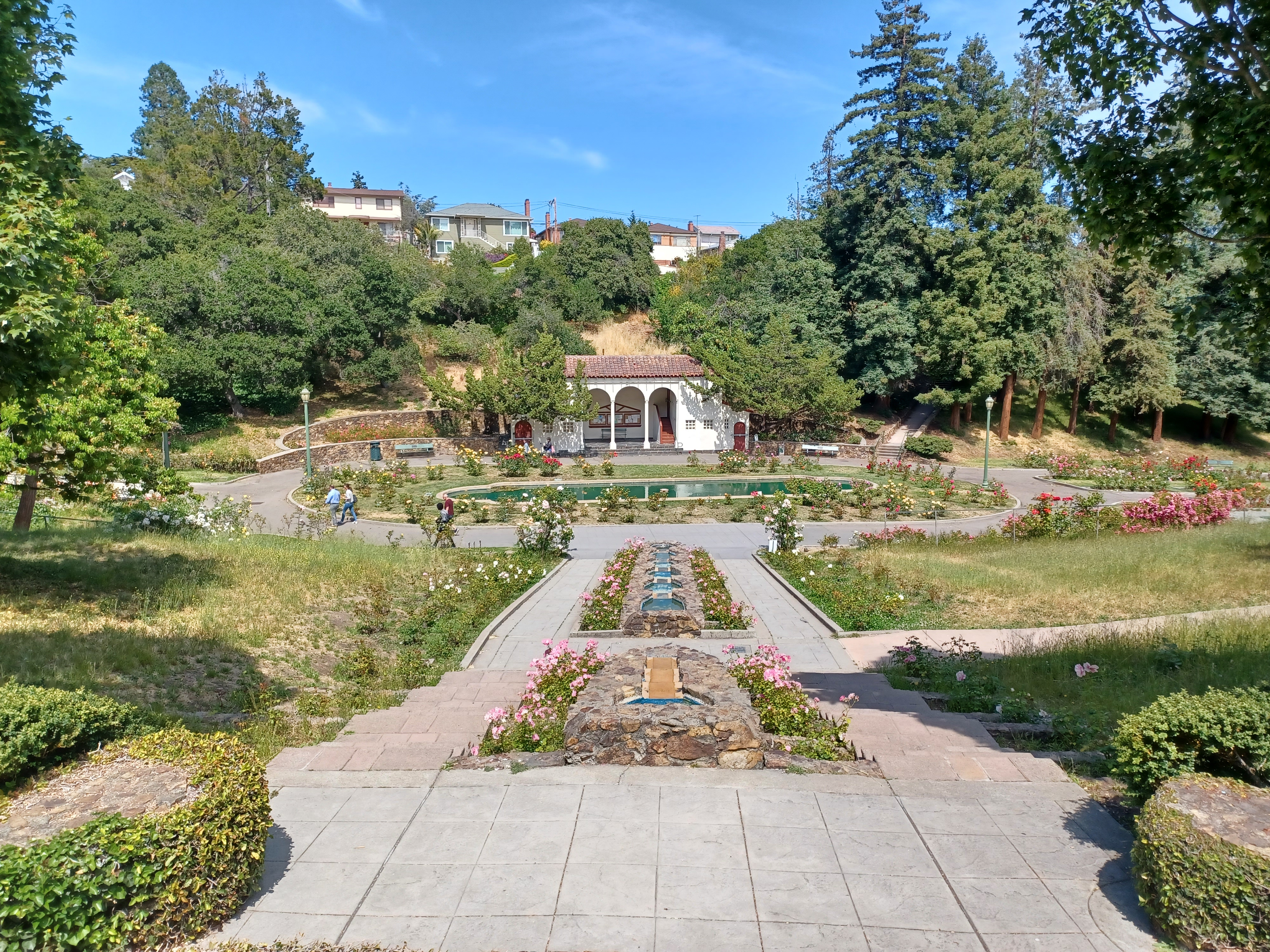
Pictured in 2023

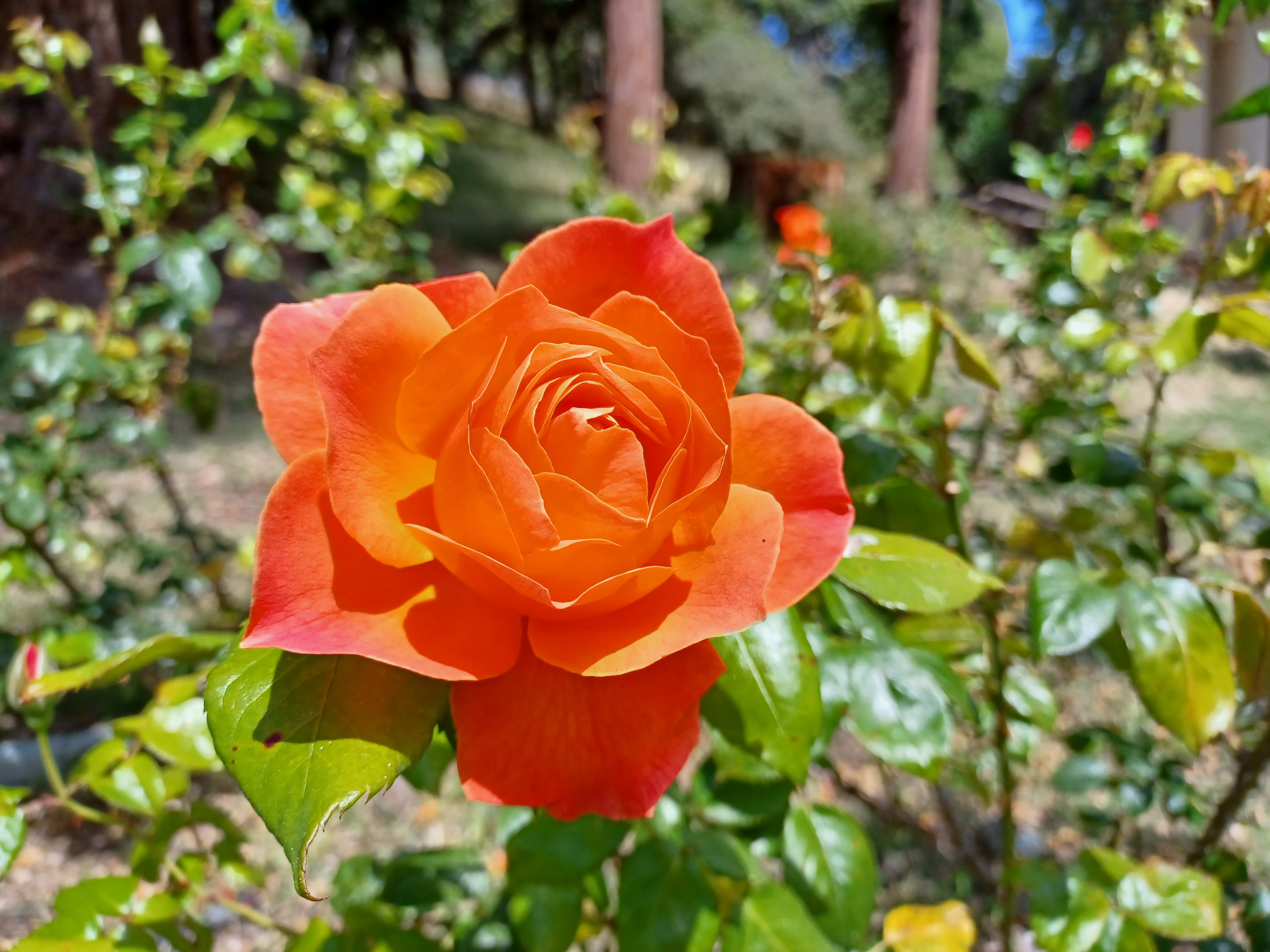
A rose at the garden

Work was begun on the garden in 1931 or 1932 and it officially opened in 1934 – with only the Florentine oval garden finished by that time. Soon after the opening, the Oakland Tribune reported an offer from the SERA of $29,460 in labor, if the city would match it with $14,600 in materials (June 27, 1934). Later, the Tribune reported that SERA workers had completed the gardens in 1934 (Tribune, Jan 1, 1935), but that can't have been true because in Spring 1935 the Tribune was reporting that SERA laborers were still at work on the cascade (April 5, 1935). Presumably, that work wrapped up in 1935.

As the Tribune described various improvement made around the city in 1934, “Great economy has been observed by the city government and few actual improvements have been made except those done by the PWA and SERA.” (Jan. 1, p 14). The Works Progress Administration (WPA), which was launched in mid-1935, would not have played any role in the gardens, despite being credited by the Oakland Heritage Alliance and by an historical marker near the park entrance (which puts the date in 1932, before the New Deal). The official brass plaque for the gardens does not mention New Deal aid.

In 1954, the garden was renamed The Morcom Amphitheater of Roses, in honor of former Oakland Mayor Fred N. Morcom. Morcom had planted the garden's first rose in his role as mayor during the construction period. The park has been refurbished at least twice, in the 1950s and 1990s, with many of the old roses (some going back to the 19th century) being regrafted on new rootstock.

== Friends of Morcom Rose Garden ==
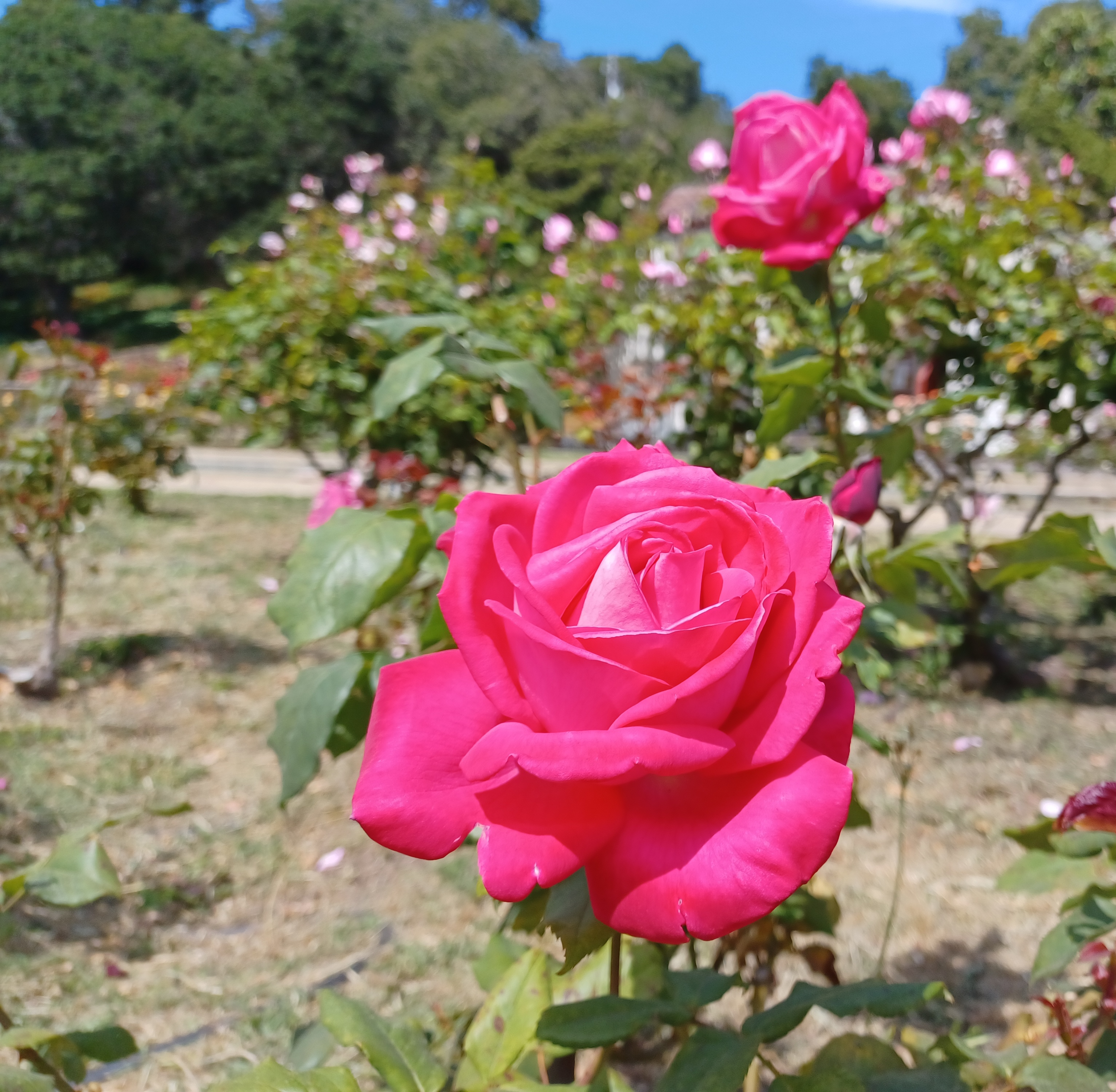
Roses at Morcom Rose Garden

In the early 2000s, a lead city gardener organized a group of volunteers called the "Dedicated Deadheaders," given the greatly reduced hours of city staff to maintain the irrigation lines, weed, and deadhead and prune the roses. The garden of over 2,400 roses bushes was originally slated to have eight full-time workers, but now has one city worker one day a week overseeing it. The Deadheaders established a website, www.FriendsofOaklandRose.org, as well as a Facebook Page. "Friends of Morcom Rose Garden," with photos of the garden often updated and contacts for ways to volunteer.
