= Brooklyn Presbyterian Church (Oakland, California) =

Historic place in Oakland, California

- U.S. National Register of Historic Places
- Oakland Designated Landmark
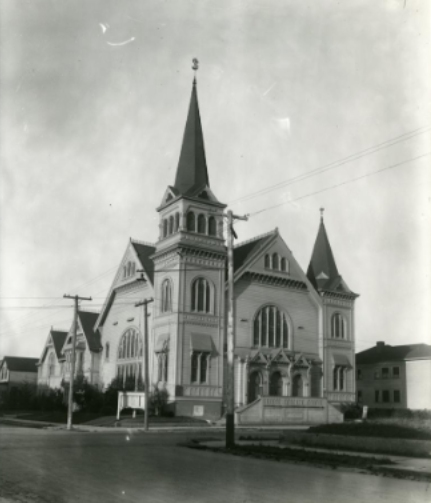
- Brooklyn Presbyterian Church in Oakland

- Location within Oakland, California Location within California
- Location: 1433 12th Avenue, Oakland, California, US
- Coordinates: 37.791250°N 122.247563°W
- Area: 0.48 acres (0.19 ha)
- Built: 1887; 139 years ago
- Architect: George A. Bordwell
- NRHP reference No.: 100001600
- ODL No.: 84

Significant dates
- Added to NRHP: September 18, 2017
- Designated ODL: 1984

Brooklyn Presbyterian Church is a historical building, completed in 1887 in Oakland, California (formerly known as Brooklyn, California). The building was listed on the National Register of Historic Places on September 18, 2017. The building was also home to the Grace Temple Baptist Church of Oakland, and the Parish Hall also was built in 1887. It is also known as the Brooklyn Preserve.

== History ==
The Brooklyn Presbyterian Church is located in an area of East Oakland once known as the township of Brooklyn, California. The building is in the Clinton neighborhood.

It is a 12,383 square feet (1,150.4 m^{2}) two-story building made of redwood lumber and has a balloon frame on a brick and mortar foundation. The church has a three-stage 66-foot bell tower and larger stained glass windows. Sunday school classroom wings were added later. It was designed in 1887 by architect George A. Bordwell in a late Victorian Romanesque style. Some believe it was designed by Samuel Newsom and Joseph Newsom. The Brooklyn Presbyterian Church congregation was founded in 1861, and they used the church from 1887 to 1972.

After the church closed in 1972, the building was vacant for sometime, and in 2022 Strive Wealth Builders started converting the church in to a 21,300 square feet (1,980 m^{2}), 42-unit housing, and 5,450 square feet (506 m^{2}) for other uses.

== See also ==
- National Register of Historic Places listings in Alameda County, California
