= St. Joseph's Home for the Aged (Oakland, California) =

Historic place in Oakland, California

- U.S. National Register of Historic Places
- Oakland Designated Landmark
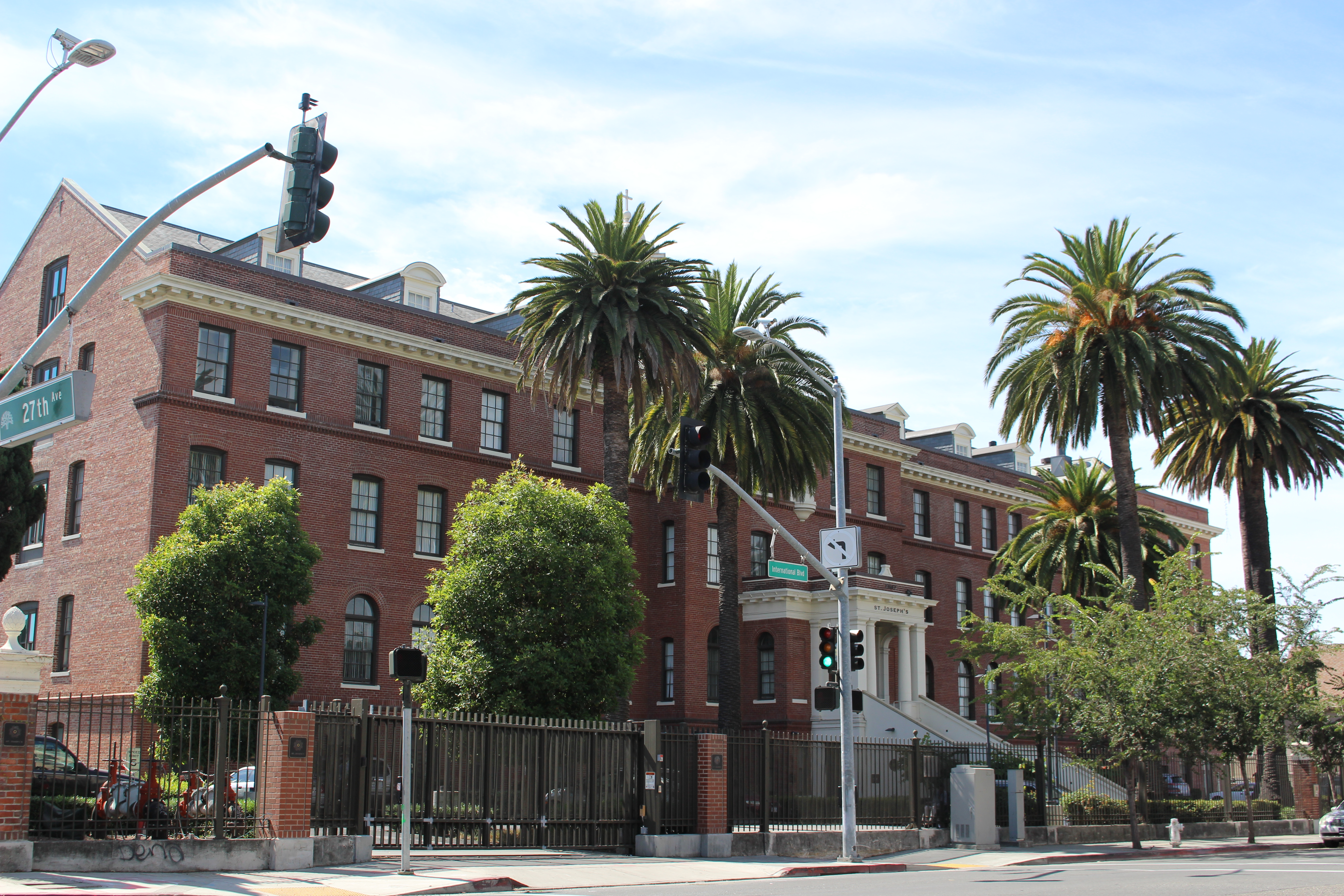
- St. Joseph's Home for the Aged

- Location within Oakland, California Location within California Location within the United States
- Location: 2647 International Blvd. Oakland, California
- Coordinates: 37.780833°N 122.231944°W
- Built: 1912; 114 years ago
- Architects: Oscar Haupt and Robert Frost
- Architectural style: Colonial Revival & Classical Revival
- NRHP reference No.: 16000864
- ODL No.: 87

Significant dates
- Added to NRHP: December 20, 2016
- Designated ODL: 1984

St. Joseph's Home for the Aged is a historical four story brick building in Oakland, California.

== History ==
The St. Joseph's Home for the Aged was built in 1912. The buildings were listed on the National Register of Historic Places on December 20, 2016. When opened in 1912, the building was the convalescent home for the elderly run by the Little Sisters of the Poor on East 14th Street. Little Sisters of the Poor closed it in 1979 due to the age of the building and new safety codes. The building is built in Colonial Revival & Classical revival architecture, designed by Oscar Haupt and Robert Frost.

In 1979 the building came back into use as St. Joseph's Professional Center, an office complex. Starting in 2010 and completed in 2012, the building was remodeled and is now up to code. The remodeled was done by Bridge Housing, who converted the building into 84 senior housing apartments, the St. Joseph's Senior Apartments, with 3,200 square feet of ground floor retail space. The remodel architect was Van Meter Williams Pollack and contractor was James E. Roberts-Obayashi Corporation.

== Gallery ==
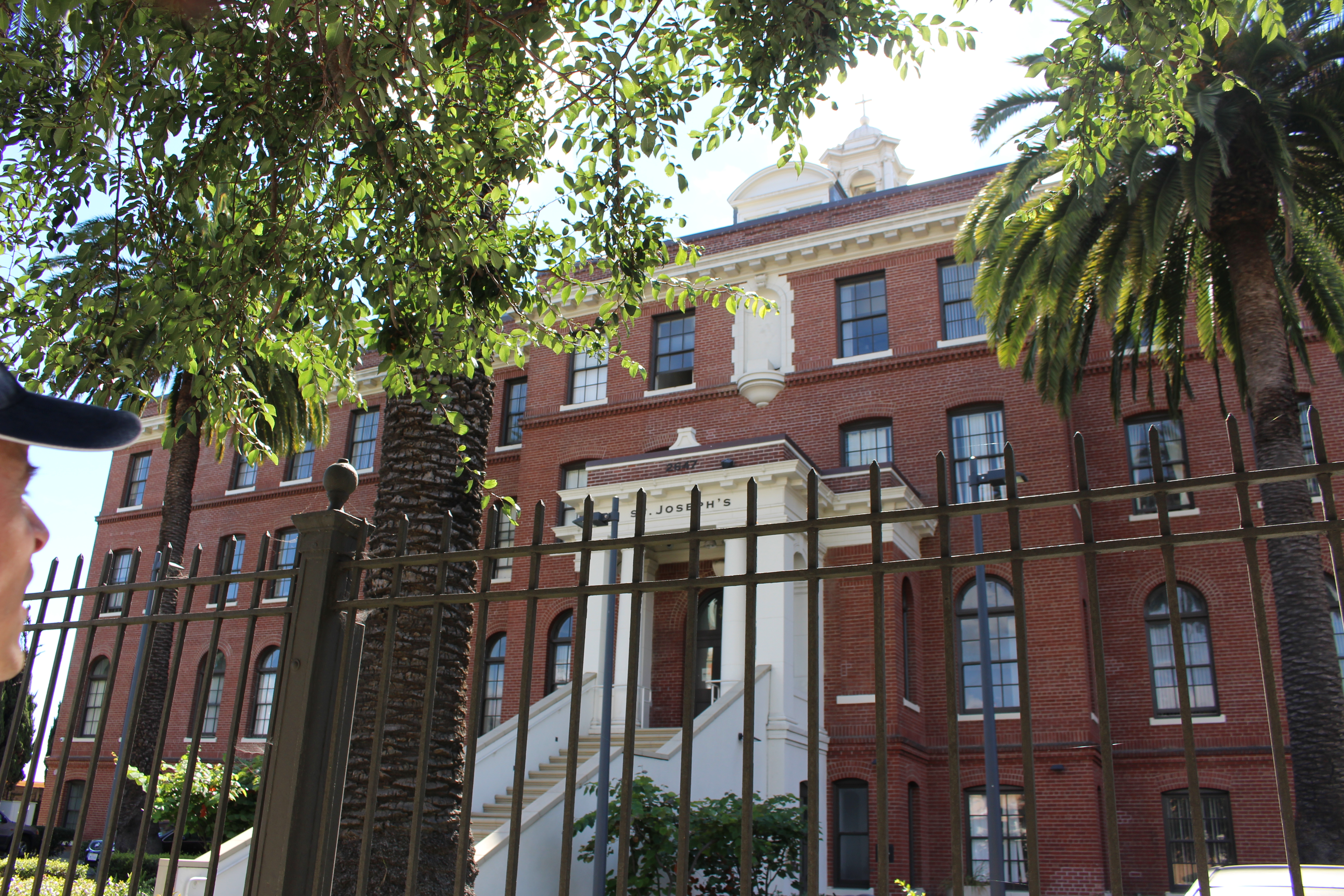

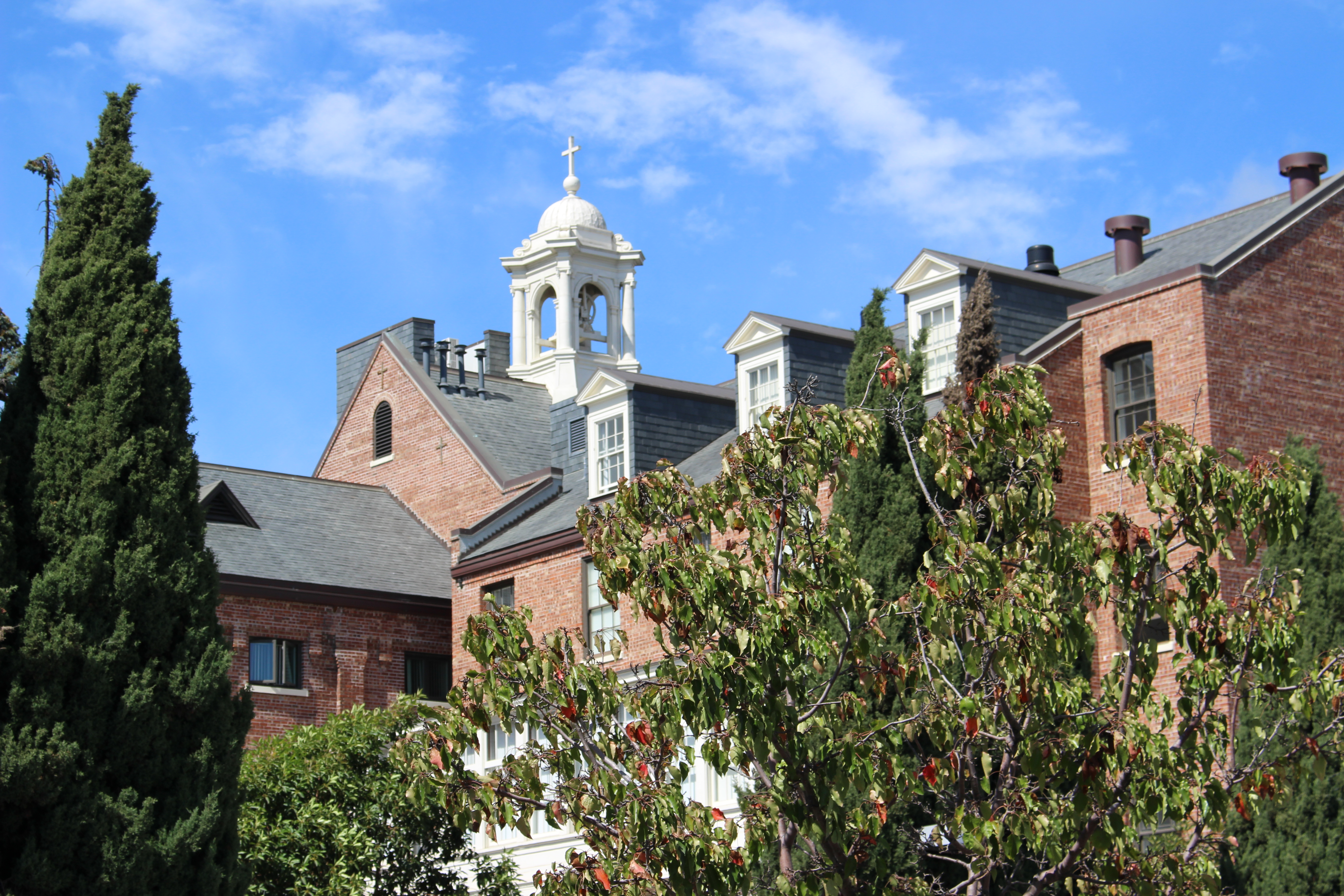

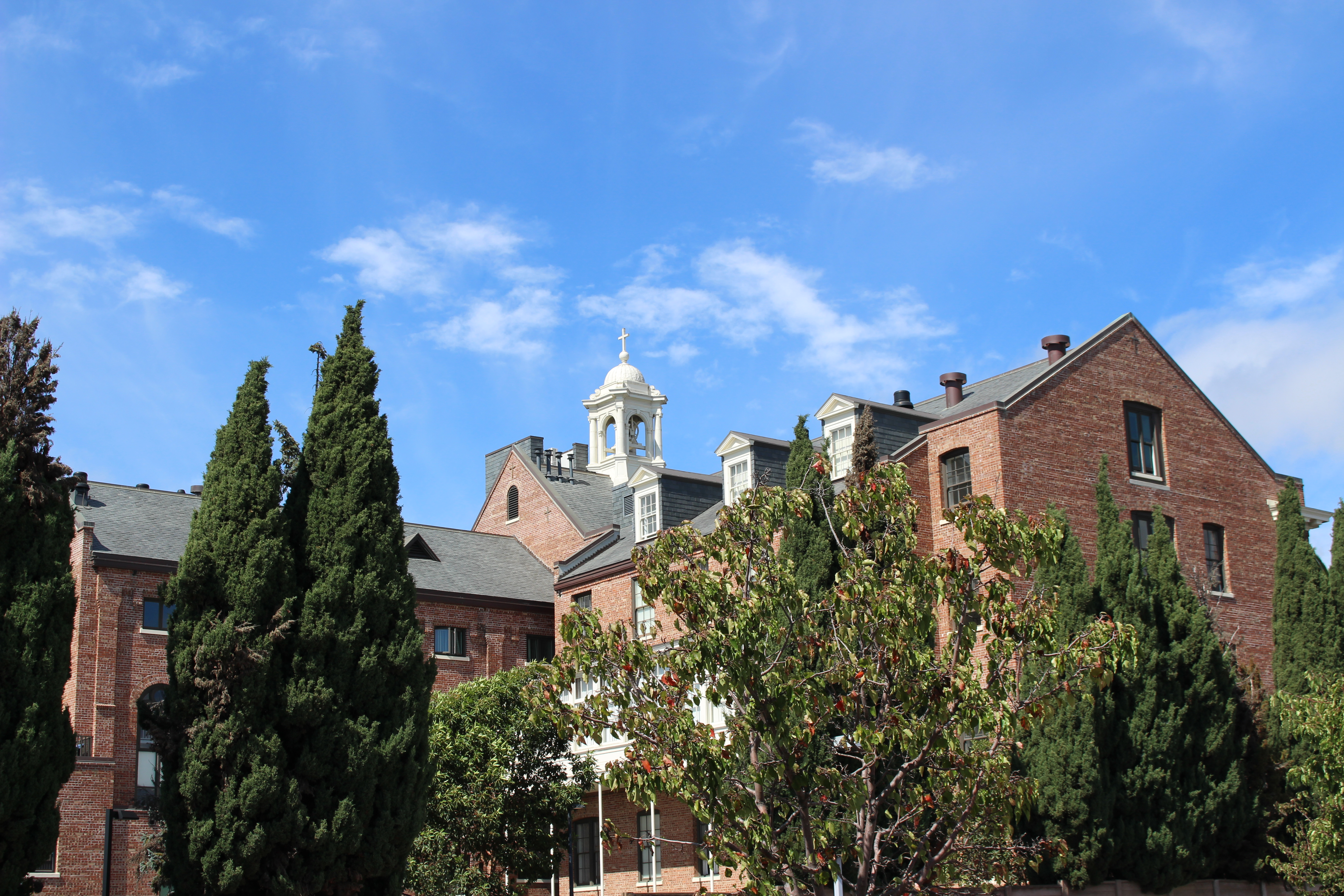

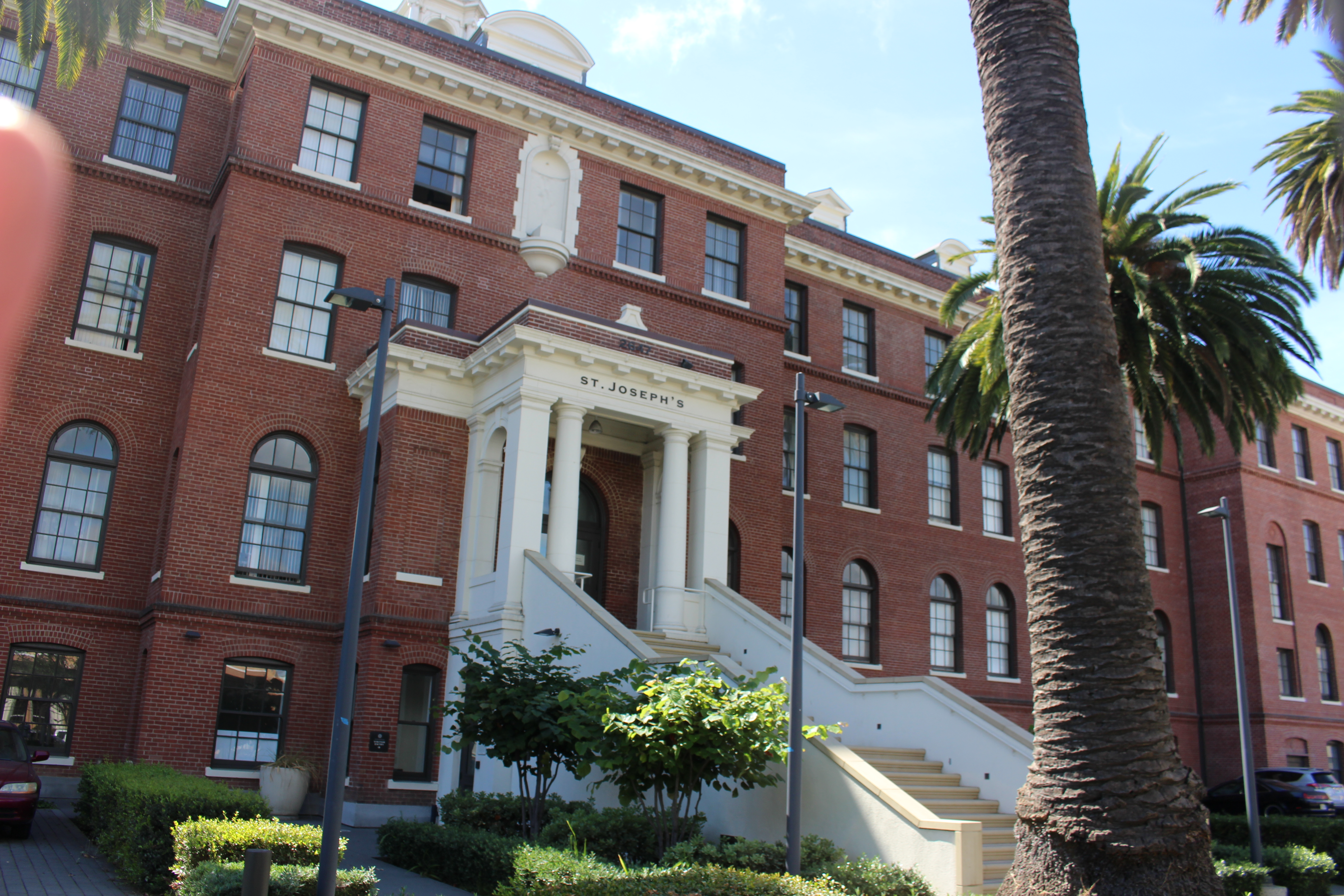

== See also ==
- National Register of Historic Places listings in Alameda County, California
