= Trinity Church (Oakland, California) =

Historic church in California, United States

- U.S. National Register of Historic Places
- Oakland Designated Landmark
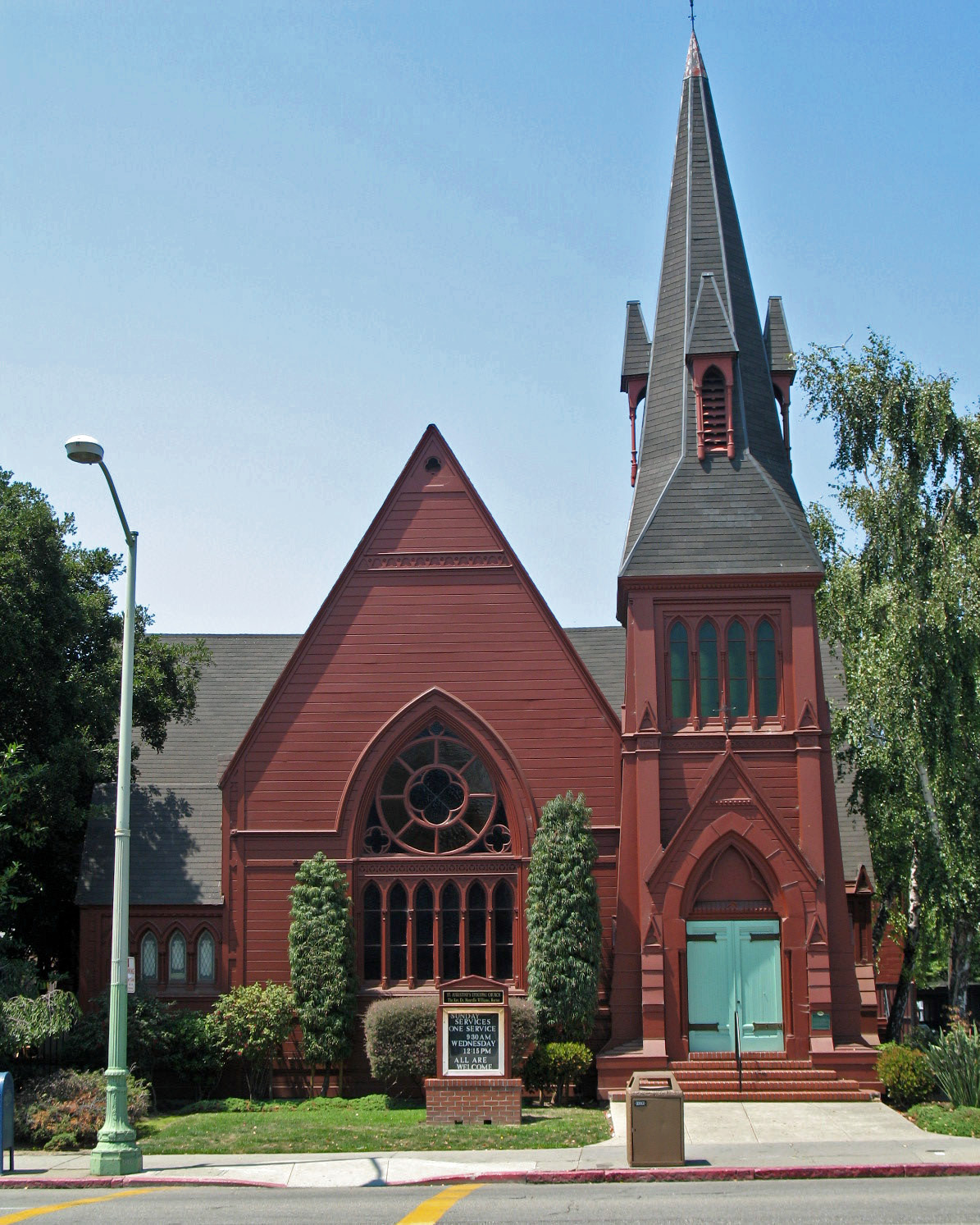

- Location within Oakland, California Location within California Location within the United States
- Location: 525 29th St., Oakland, California
- Coordinates: 37°49′6″N 122°16′1″W
- Area: 0.2 acres (0.081 ha)
- Built: 1893
- Built by: F.C. Bignani
- Architect: William H. Hamilton
- Architectural style: Late Gothic Revival
- NRHP reference No.: 82002167
- ODL No.: 42

Significant dates
- Added to NRHP: February 4, 1982
- Designated ODL: 1980

St. Augustine's Episcopal Church in Oakland, California, formerly known as Trinity Episcopal Church, is a historic church at 525 29th Street. It was built in 1893 and added to the National Register of Historic Places in 1982.

The complex includes a chapel built in 1886 and moved to the site in 1891, a recreation hall built in 1925, and a c.1900 parish house moved to the site around 1912.
