= Moyel House =

Building in Lyngby-Taarbæk Municipality, Denmark

- Moyels Gård
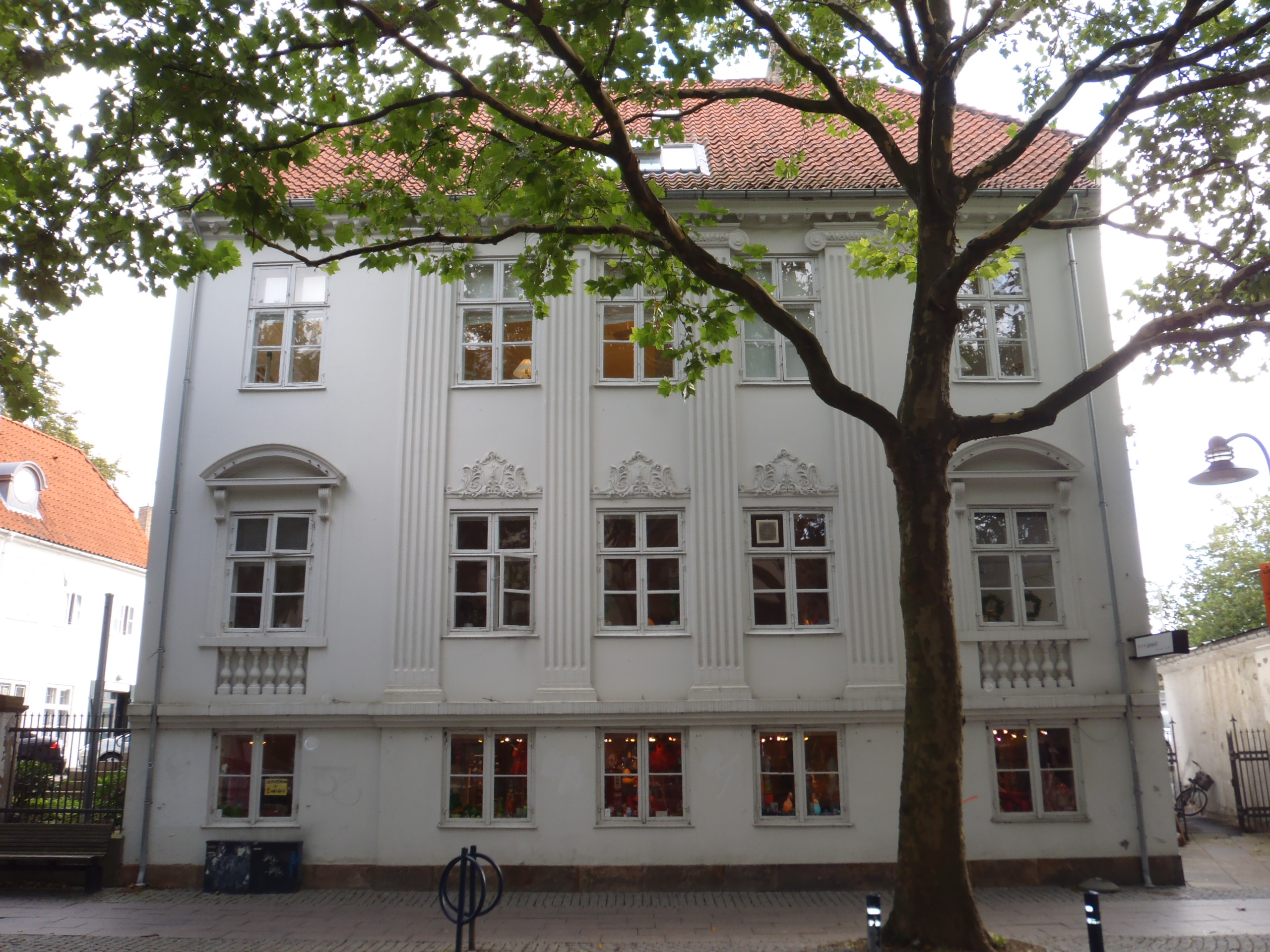
- The Moyel House seen from the street.
- Interactive map of the Moyel House area

General information
- Location: Kongens Lyngby, Copenhagen, Denmark
- Coordinates: 55°46′15.14″N 12°30′11.98″E
- Completed: 1807
- Inaugurated: 1680s

The Moyel House (Danish: Moyels Gård), also known as the White Mansion (Danish: Det Hvide Palæ), is a listed property at Lyngby Hovedgade 37 in Kongens Lyngby, Lyngby-Taarbæk Municipality, in the northern suburbs of Copenhagen, Denmark.

== History ==
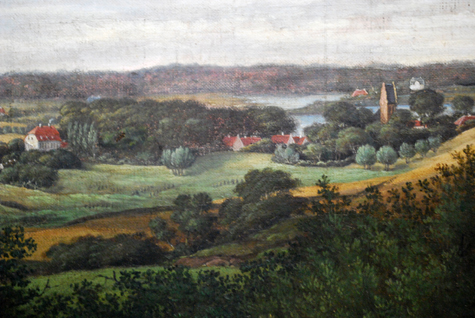
Kongens Lyngby in c. 1820 with the White Mansion visible on the left

The royal road to Frederiksborg was opened to the public in 1767. It was blocked by boom barriers where a road toll was collected. One of the boom houses was located just south of Kongens Lyngby. It was later converted into a country retreat known as Bomhuset (The Boom House). Its owner acquired more land on the east side of the road.

David Moyel (1753–1831), a furniture dealer, purchased the property in 1804. In 1807, he constructed the White Mansion with two identical apartments which were let out to citizens from Copenhagen during the summer season. The two kitchens were located in the basement. Moyel was also the owner of the neighboring building Bomhuset.

== Architecture ==
The two-storey building is designed in the Neoclassical style. It is five bays long and five bays wide, giving it an almost cubic appearance. The main entrance in the north gable is marked by a granite portal with sandstone decorations. Ionic order pilasters flank the three central bays of the facade.

== Today ==
The building is now home to the Institute for Orthomolecular Medicine.
