= Preservation Park =

Park in Oakland, California, USA

Coordinates: 37.805567°N 122.276975°W

Thornton House

Stage in Nile Hall.

Preservation Park is located in Oakland, California. The park includes sixteen historic buildings, five of which stand in their original location, and eleven of which were moved from elsewhere in Oakland to avoid demolition. The sixteen houses are arranged to resemble a late 19th-century Oakland neighborhood.

The park is open to the public during the day (the buildings are not open to the public), and areas are often rented out for parties, meetings and weddings. Many non-profits have offices here.

The park is bordered by 12th Street, Castro Street, 14th Street and Martin Luther King, Jr. Way. 13th Street goes into the park and ends at the Latham-Ducel Fountain. Preservation Park Way, a one-way street, starts at the fountain, and ends at 12th Street. The park is next to the African American Museum and Library at Oakland.

== Buildings ==
=== Italianate ===
Bartling House, Italianate Row House. Originally stood at what is now the 14th Street freeway overpass. Owned by William Bartling, partner in a San Francisco bookbinding firm.

Higgins House, Italianate style. Elisha Higgins was a San Francisco lumber dealer.

Knox-Buckley House, Italianate Villa. Henry Knox was a San Francisco dentist. The house was originally located on what is now 28th Street in what is now called "Pill Hill." The house was later owned by John and Catherine Buckley. This was the last home moved to Preservation Park.

Park House, Italianate Villa. Charles O. Park painted train cars for the Central Pacific Railroad. This house originally stood at 7th and Grove. This home was moved twice.

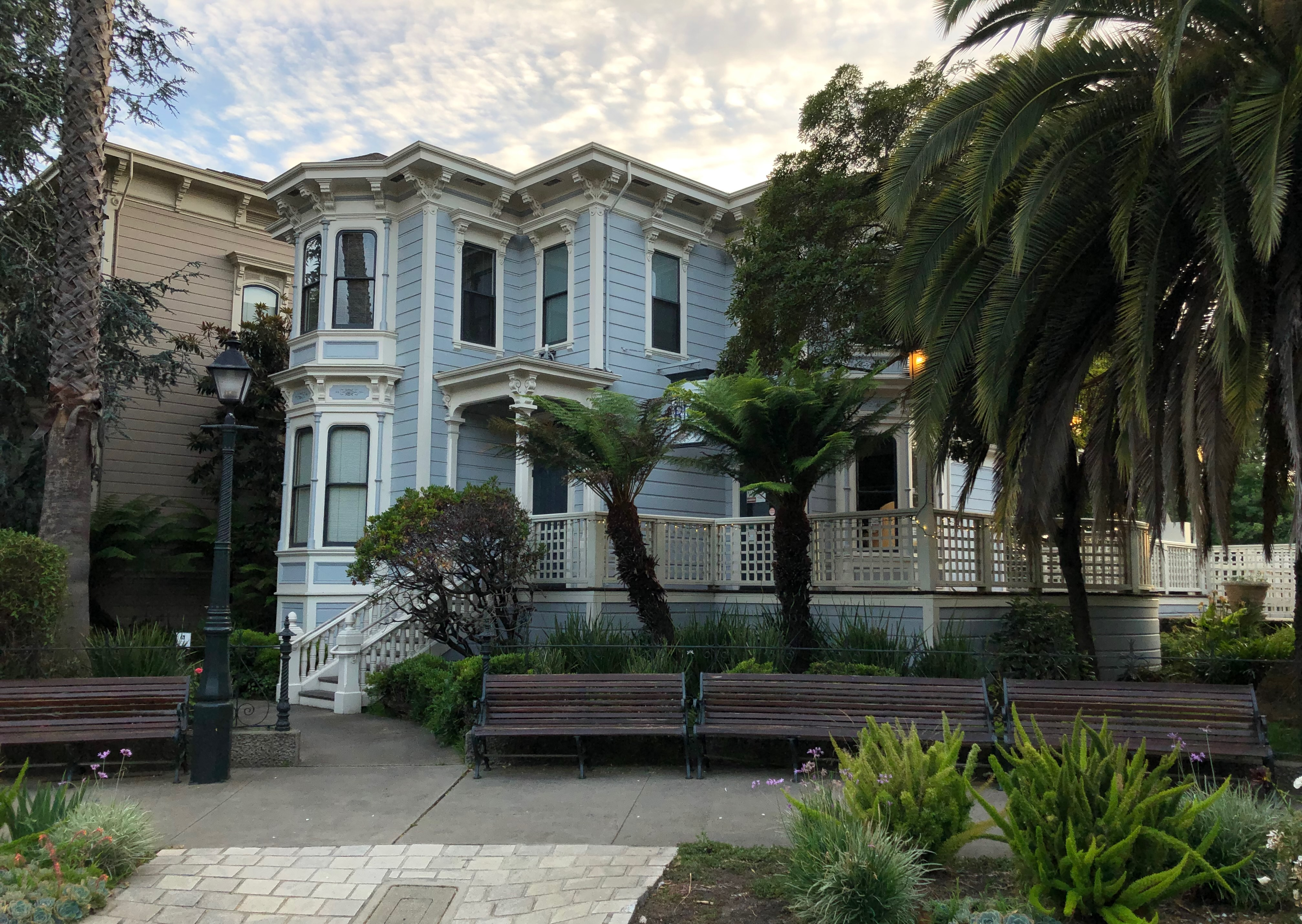
James White House

White House (or James White House), Italianate style. Owned by Ellen Gould White and James White. Together, they worked within the Seventh Day Adventist church. They launched a paper called Signs of the Times. This building now houses the Preservation Park offices and the Rio California cafe.

=== Queen Anne ===
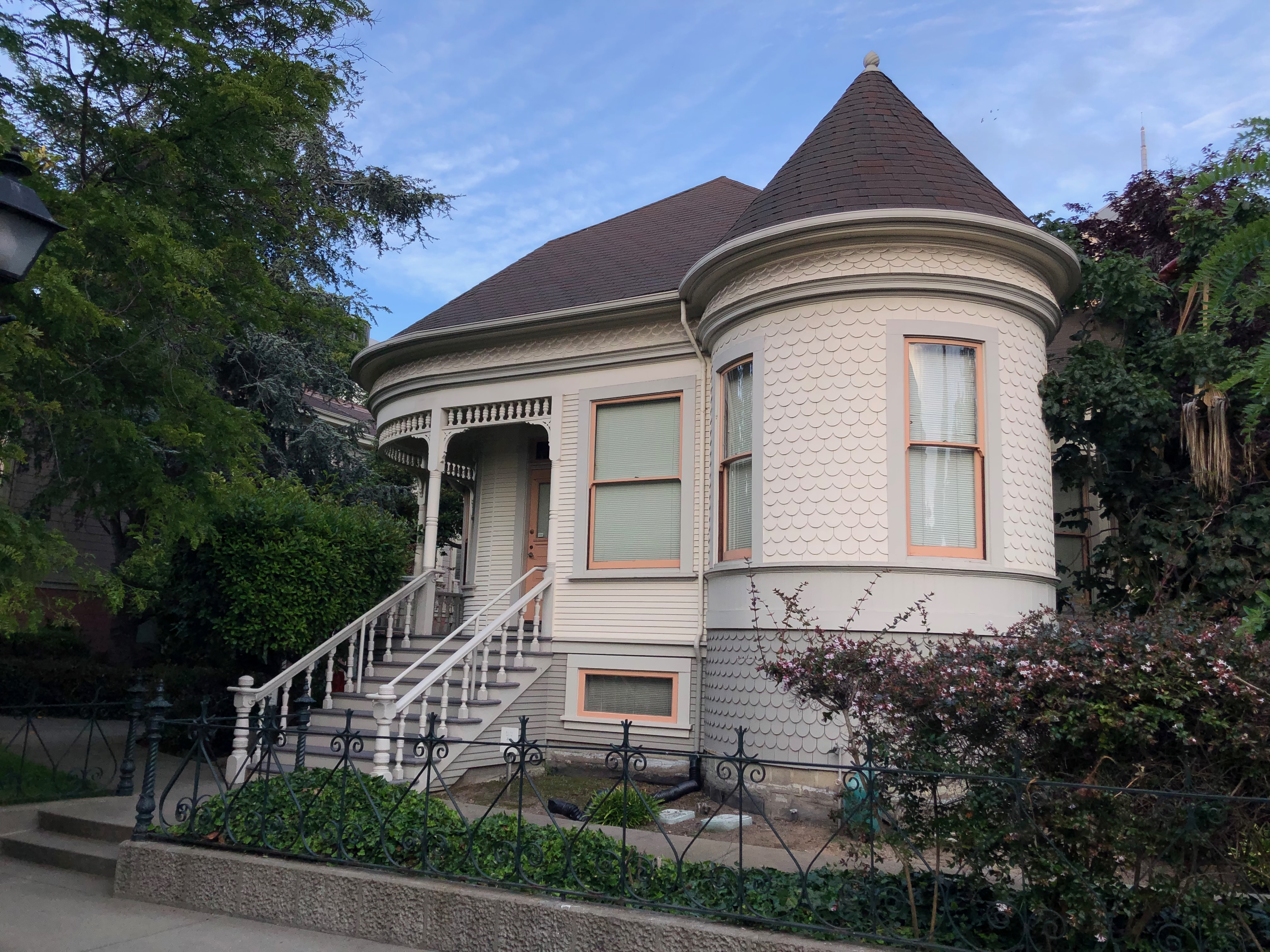
Bauske House

Bauske House, Queen Anne Cottage. Built by Reinhold Bauske, dentist, for his wife, Hazel. The home was originally located near Glen Echo Creek.

Hunt House, Queen Anne Cottage style. George C. Hunt handled horses, and with his brother, he owned the City Hall Livery Stables. The home was later owned by saloonkeeper Charles Appedorn.

Jacobs House, Queen Anne style rowhouse with two interior units. Jacobs was a Prussian-trained tailor. His house was originally located on 16th Street near Jefferson, where the next-door neighbor was pianist and painter Pauline Powell Burns.

Remillard House, Queen Anne style. Pierre Remillard was a brickyard owner, and his bricks were used in the construction of the nearby First Unitarian Church of Oakland. Lilly Remillard tutored Jack London at the home.

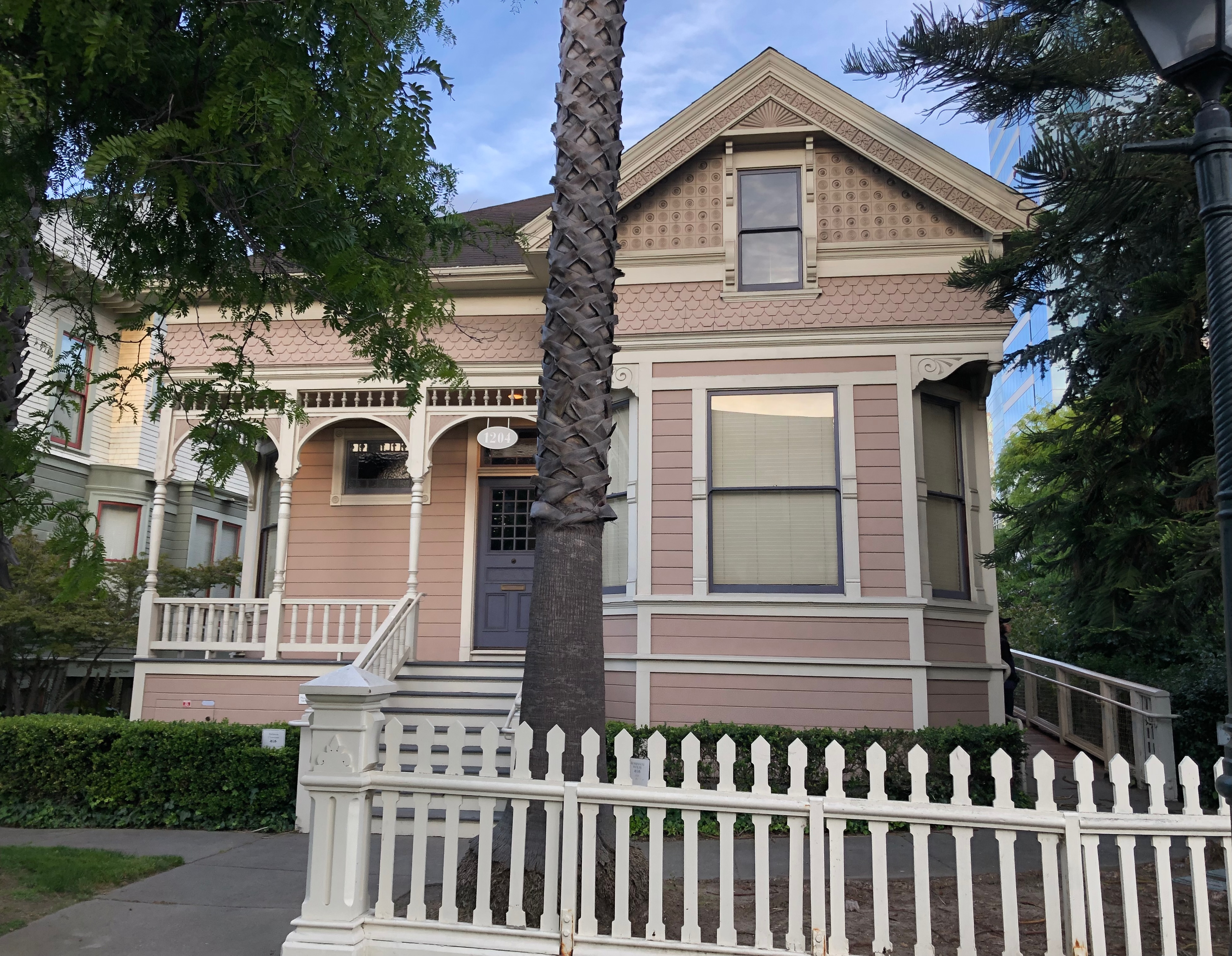
Robinson House

Robinson House, Queen Anne Cottage style. Owned by Gertrude and W.H. Robinson. Originally built in Fruit Vale, or what is now called Fruitvale.

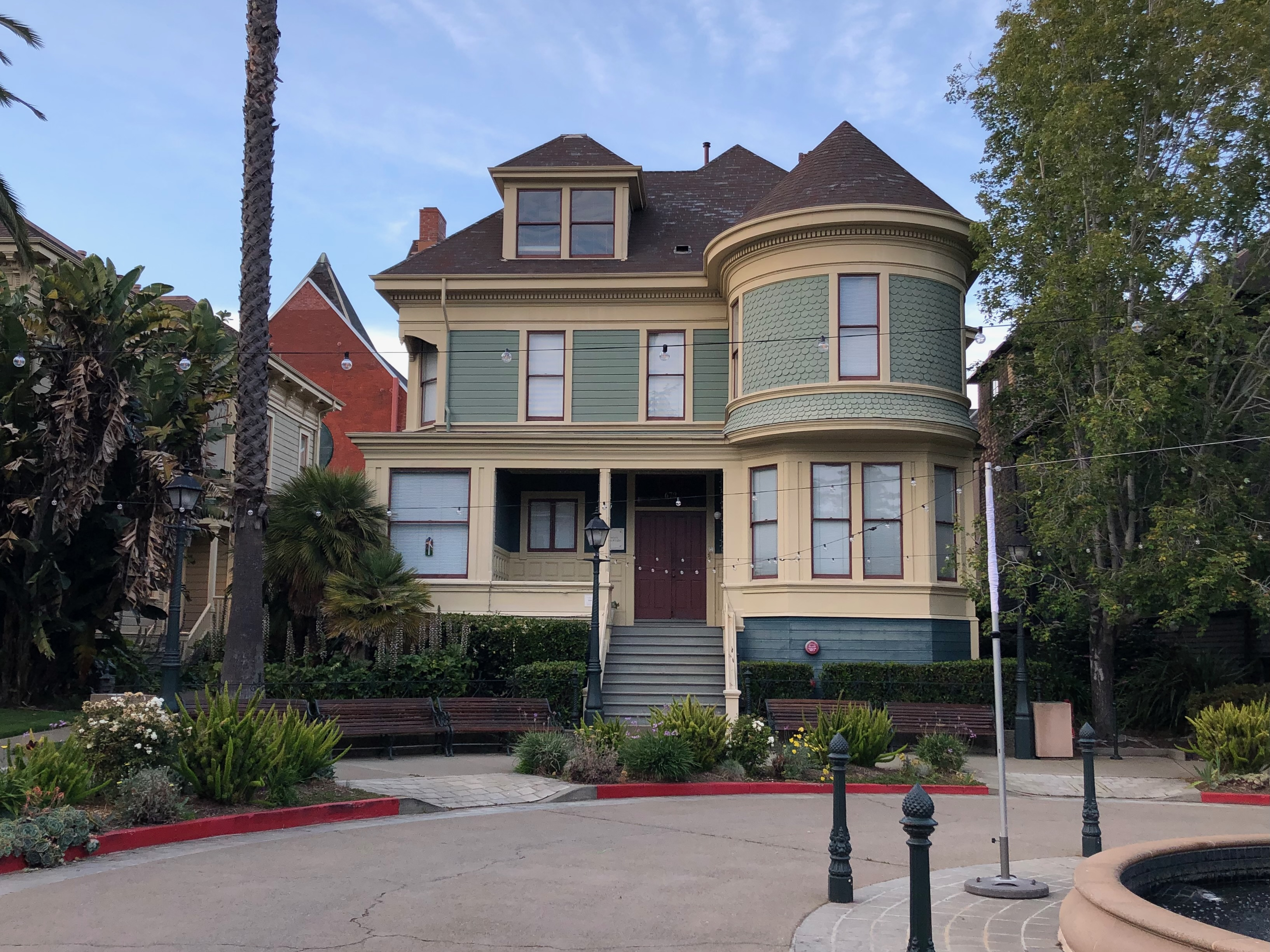
Thornton House

Thornton House, Queen Anne style. Thornton was a capitalist. The home was built when the Sather House and Garden occupied the lot across the street. Jane Sather is the donor of UC Berkeley's Sather Gate and Sather Tower. Later, the home was purchased by Orrin Gowell, who became an architect in the office that designed the 1923 Tribune Tower.

=== Other styles ===
Ginn House (or Frederick B. Ginn House), English Arts and Crafts style. Frederick Burrell Ginn and wife Mary Crocker commissioned architect A. Page Brown to design the home. Brown later worked on the San Francisco Ferry Building.

Nile Club (or Nile Hall), Craftsman style. The Nile Club, a members-only group of Oakland's male elite, built a theater next to Ginn House. It was later used as a USO facility. Designed by Charles W. Dickey, who also worked on the Claremont Hotel.

Raymond House, Colonial Revival style. William J. Raymond was a professor of physics at the University of California, which, at that time, was located between 12th and 14th Streets between Franklin and Harrison Streets. Jacobs House originally stood on 16th Street.

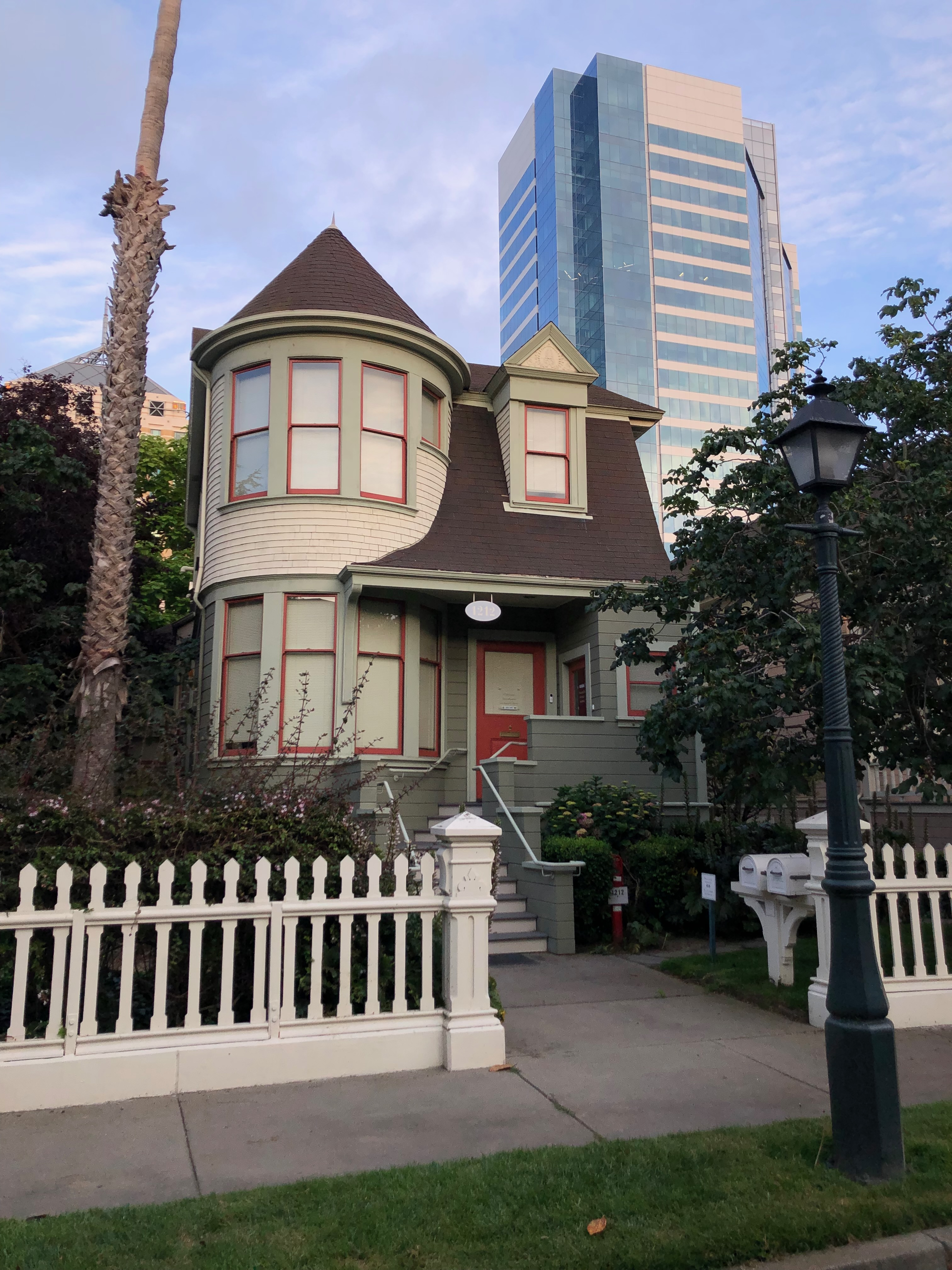
Standeford House

Standeford House, Shingle style. Built for Miss Stella Standeford. Her father worked at the San Francisco Mint. She later married John F. Conners, who became the owner and publisher of the Oakland Enquirer.

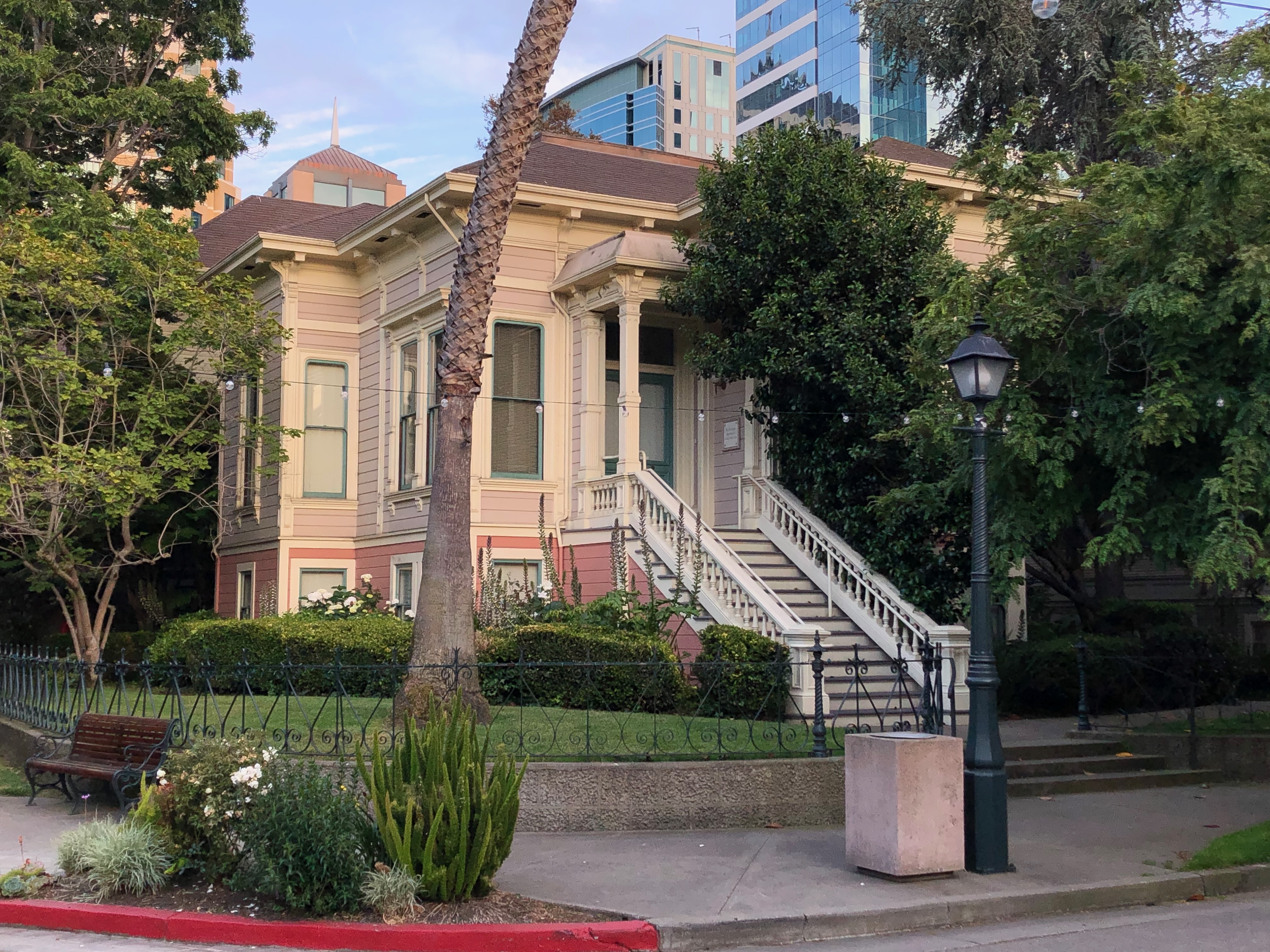
Trowbridge House

Trowbridge House, Stick Style. Originally built by multimillionaire Frederick William Delger for his daughter, Lillie, and her new husband, Henry Trowbridge. This home was originally located behind the Fox Oakland Theater.

== Additional structures ==
There are two other significant structures: the bandstand and the Latham-Ducel Fountain. The cast iron fountain was forged in Paris and features the moon goddess Diana with acanthus leaf ornament. It originally stood at Latham House and Gardens, originally located at what is now 17th and Jackson Streets.
