= White Mansion (Oakland, California) =

Historic house in California, United States

- U.S. National Register of Historic Places
- Oakland Designated Landmark
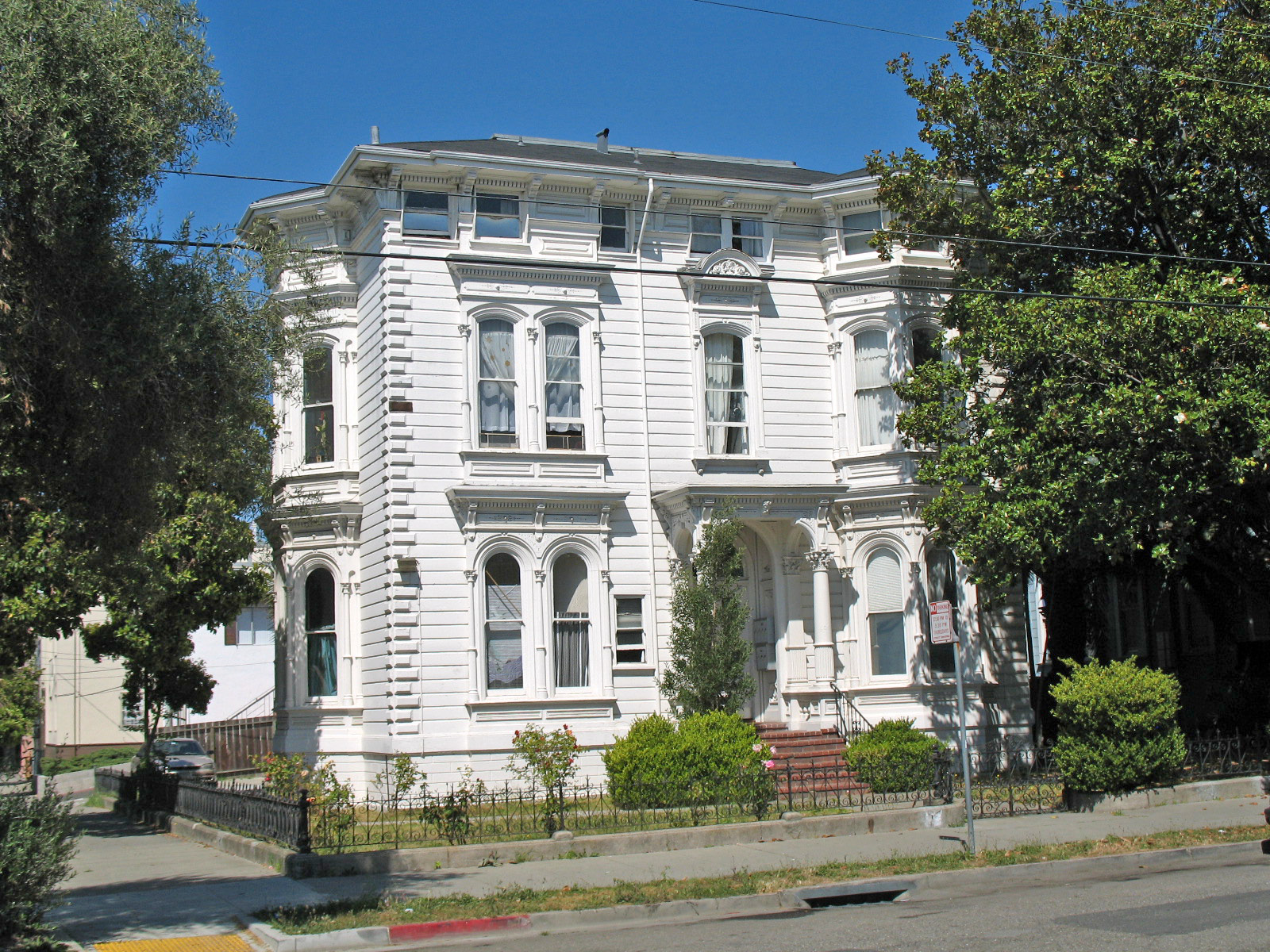
- The White Mansion in 2009

- Location within California
- Location: 604 E. 17th St., Oakland, California
- Coordinates: 37°47′50″N 122°14′59″W
- Area: 0.2 acres (0.081 ha)
- Built: 1878; 148 years ago
- Architectural style: Italianate
- NRHP reference No.: 80000797
- ODL No.: 42

Significant dates
- Added to NRHP: October 31, 1980
- Designated ODL: 1980

The White Mansion, also known as the Asa L. White Mansion, is a historic house built in 1878 in Oakland, California. It has been listed on the National Register of Historic Places since October 31, 1980.

== History ==
It was built in 1878 for Asa L. White (1842–1924), a Canadian businessman who purchased the plot of land from the Remillard Brothers in 1877. The house was designed in the Italianate architectural style.

Asa White was nicknamed "the father of hardwood on the Pacific coast". With his brothers Jacob and Peter, White was the co-founder of White Brothers, a construction subcontractor responsible for many houses in San Francisco. By the 1980s, the White Mansion still belonged to the White family.

== Description ==
The house is built in the Italianate style, and sits at the intersection of 6th Avenue and East 17th Street in Oakland. It once had expansive gardens in the rear, which no longer exist.

The house is made of redwood, and features a front porch with Corinthian columns, with a grotesque mask as the keystone. The windows are embellished with slender colonnettes, topped by cornices with dentil ornamentation. The house has a hip roof with small rectangular windows along the roofline.

After construction, The White Mansion underwent modifications, including a rear wing extension and addition of a sizable parlor adjacent to the dining room. Around 1910, the second story was extended to the rear, accommodating a 'morning room' above the kitchen.

== See also ==
- National Register of Historic Places listings in Alameda County, California
- List of Oakland Designated Landmarks
