= List of tallest buildings in Oakland =

Skyline of Oakland
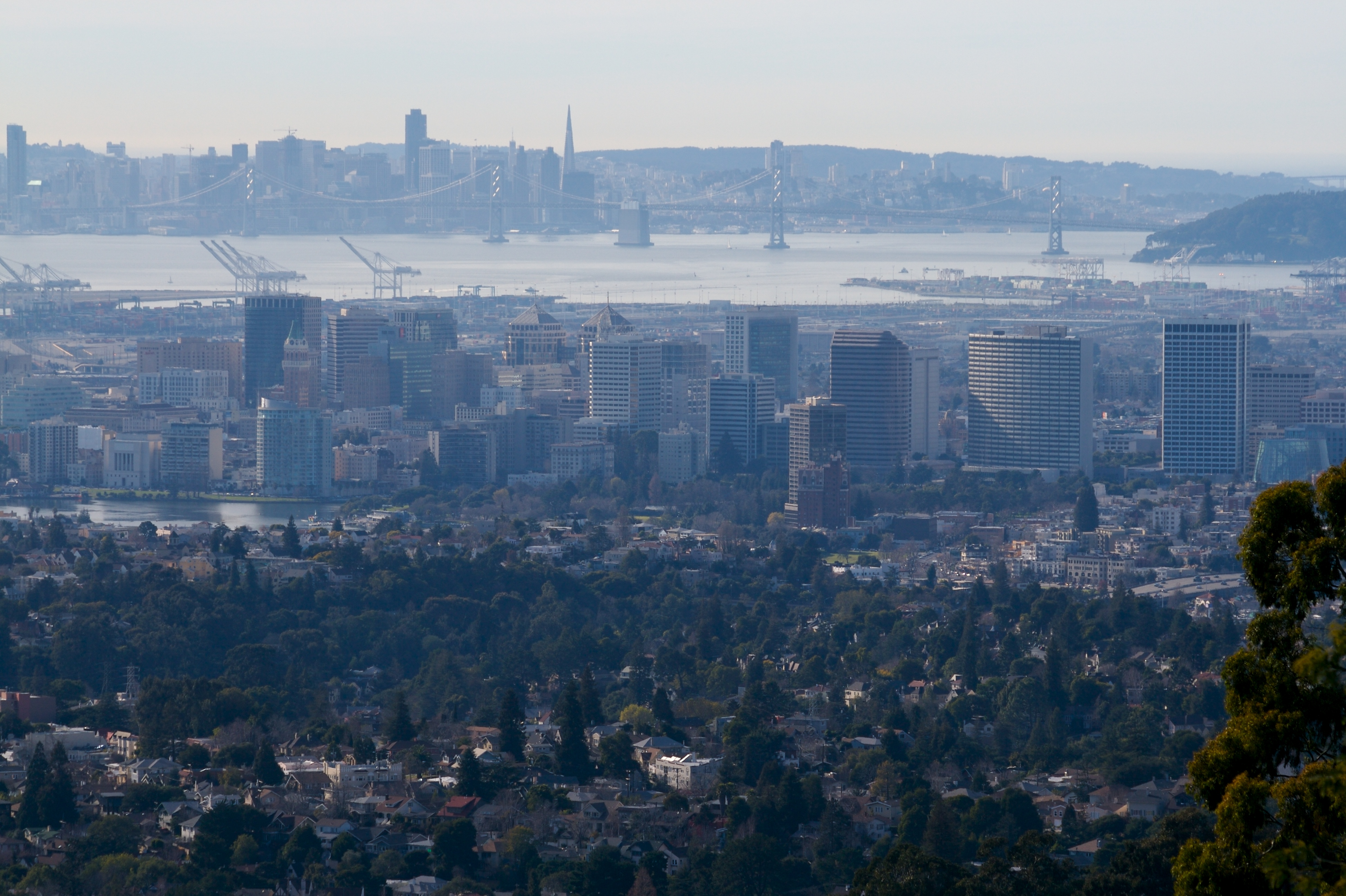
- Downtown Oakland in 2014 as viewed from the Berkeley Hills, with San Francisco in the background
- Tallest building: Ordway Building (1970)
- Tallest building height: 404 ft (123.1 m)

Number of tall buildings (2026)
- Taller than 100 m (328 ft): 12

Number of tall buildings — feet
- Taller than 200 ft (61.0 m): 41
- Taller than 300 ft (91.4 m): 18

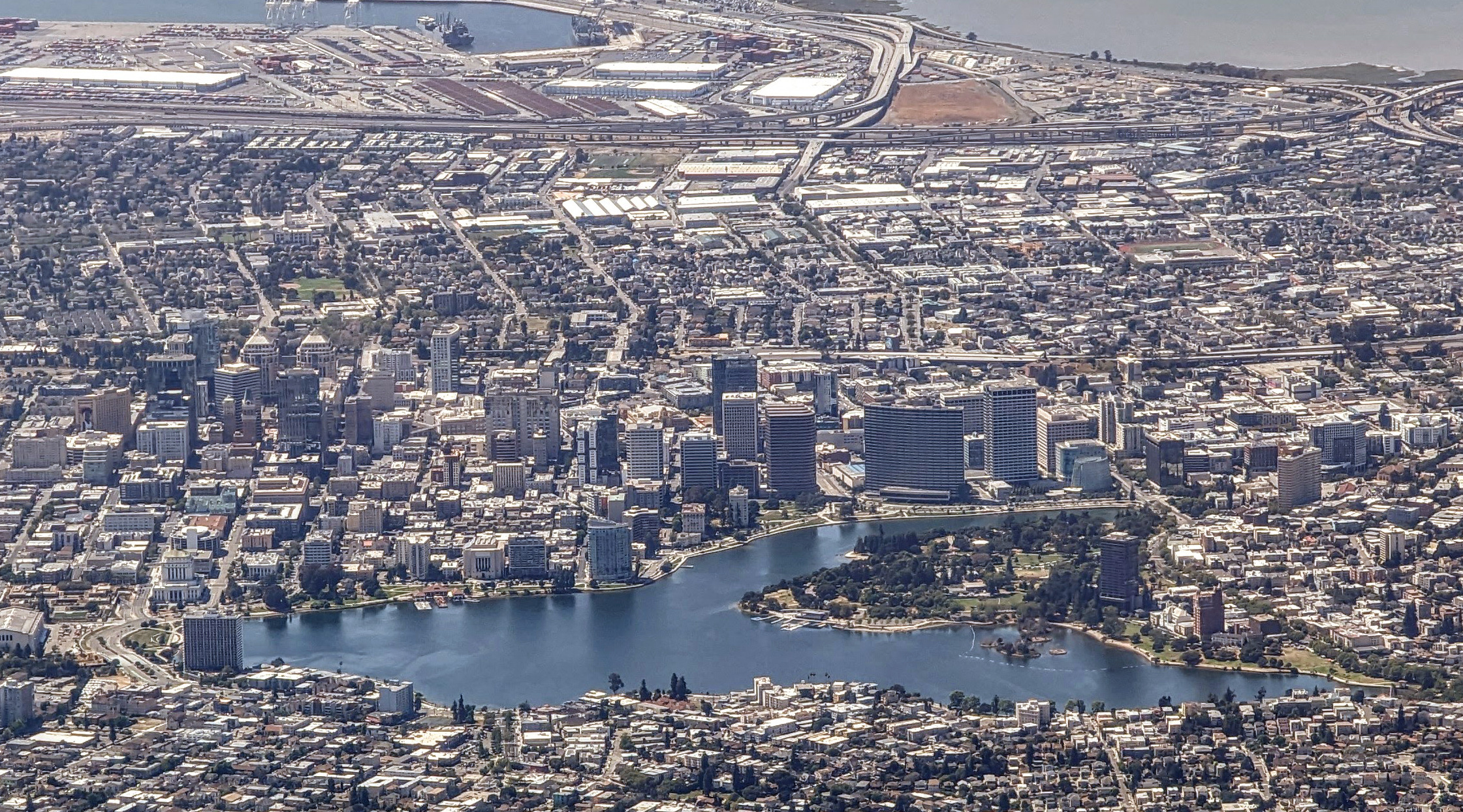
Aerial view of Oakland in 2023

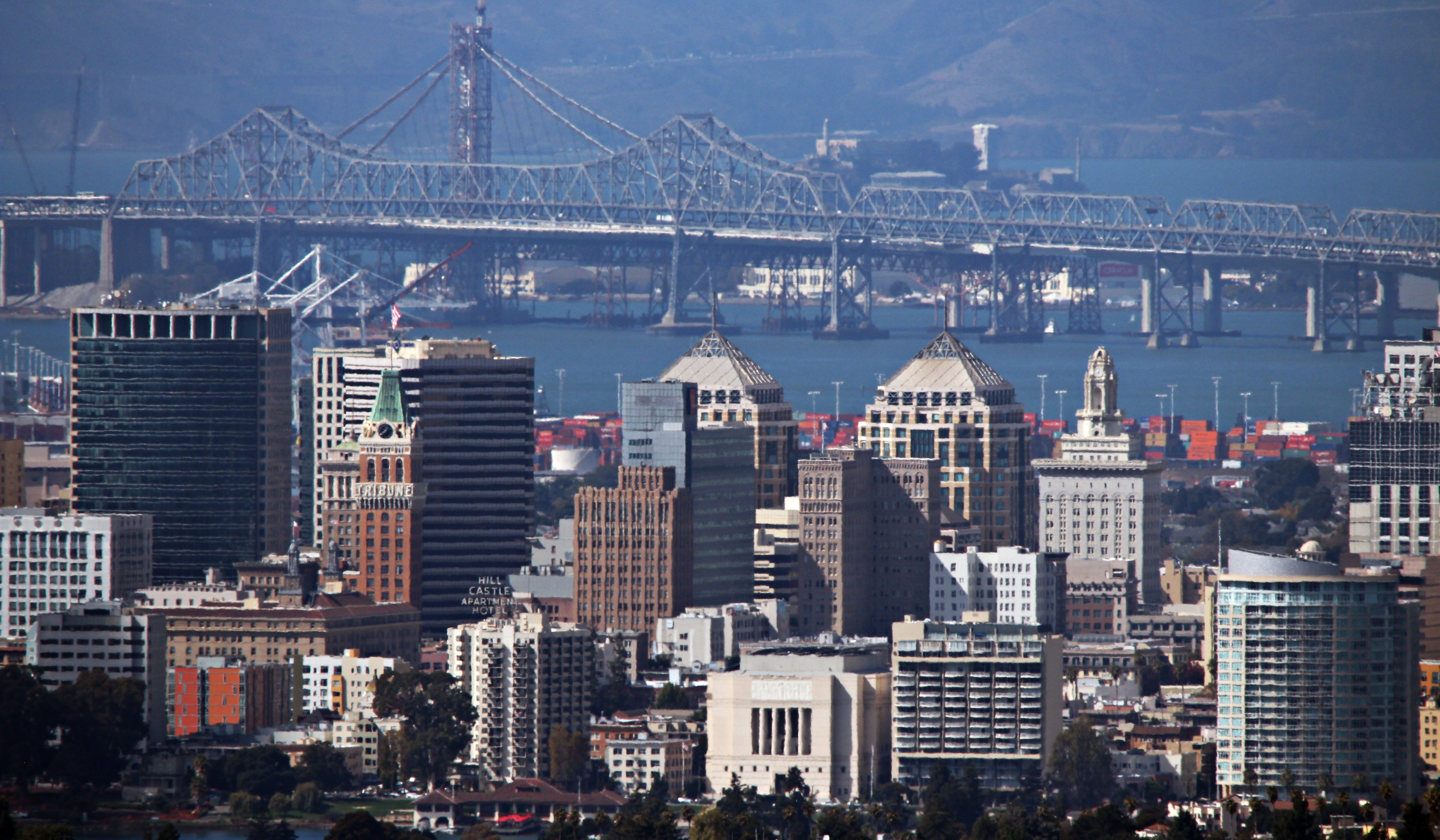
Downtown Oakland and the San Francisco–Oakland Bay Bridge

Oakland, the third most populous city in the San Francisco Bay Area, in the U.S. state of California, is home to 40 buildings taller than 200 feet (61 m) as of 2026. Eighteen buildings in Oakland reach a height of 300 feet (91 m) or more, the fourth most of any city in California, after San Francisco, Los Angeles, and San Diego. Oakland has the second largest skyline in Northern California and the Bay Area. The tallest building in Oakland is the 28-story Ordway Building, built in 1970 at a height of 404 feet (123.1 m). Atlas, a residential tower that is the city's second tallest, is less than a foot shorter at a height of 403 feet (122.9 m).

Oakland rose as a major city alongside San Francisco in the late 19th century. The city's earliest high-rises, the Gothic Revival style Cathedral Building and the Beaux-Arts Oakland City Hall, the first high-rise city hall, both rose in 1914. At 319 ft (97 m), the city hall was among the tallest buildings in the United States west of the Mississippi River at the time, second to Seattle's Smith Tower. A minor construction boom occurred during the 1920s, including the completion of the Tribune Tower, home to the Oakland Tribune newspaper. Following the Great Depression, few tall buildings were added to the city until the 1960s.

A larger building boom took place in Oakland from the 1960s to 1990s, shaping the city's current skyline. Several office towers were completed in part due to companies founded by American Industrialist Henry J. Kaiser, including Ordway Tower, headquarters of Kaiser Permanente; the Kaiser Center, former headquarters of Kaiser Industries; and the Kaiser Engineering Building. Commercial high-rise development fell in the 1990s, during which two major governmental buildings were constructed instead: the two-towered Ronald V. Dellums Federal Building and the Elihu M. Harris State Office Building. A residential apartment boom began in the late 2010s, with Oakland adding more housing units than San Francisco in 2019. New buildings in the skyline include Atlas, 1900 Broadway, and 17th and Broadway, Oakland's second, third, and fifth tallest buildings respectively. The boom has dwindled by 2024 in part due to financial constraints and other factors as a result of the COVID-19 pandemic.

Oakland's tallest buildings are concentrated in Downtown Oakland, which is north of the Oakland Estuary and Interstate 880, east of Interstate 980, and west of Lake Merritt; a few high-rises sit on the shores of Lake Merritt. The Skylyne, completed in 2020 in Temescal, is the tallest building in the neighborhood and outside downtown. Downtown Oakland and its skyline is located across the San Francisco Bay from nearby San Francisco. From some angles, such as from the Oakland Hills, the two skylines are visible together.

== History ==
Number of buildings by height in Oakland by the end of each year, based on the list below. Click on the legend to toggle a specific height on or off. View chart definition.

The history of high-rises in Oakland began with the completion of the nine-story Bank of America Building in 1907. A nine-story section was later added to the same building. It remained the tallest building in the city until 1914, when the Oakland City Hall, at 320 feet (98 m), became the tallest. At the time it was built, the City Hall was the first high-rise government building in the United States and the tallest building west of the Mississippi River. The 390 feet (119 m) Kaiser Center surpassed the height of the City Hall in 1960, and was the tallest building for a decade. In 1970, Ordway Building became the tallest building in the city.

== Cityscape ==
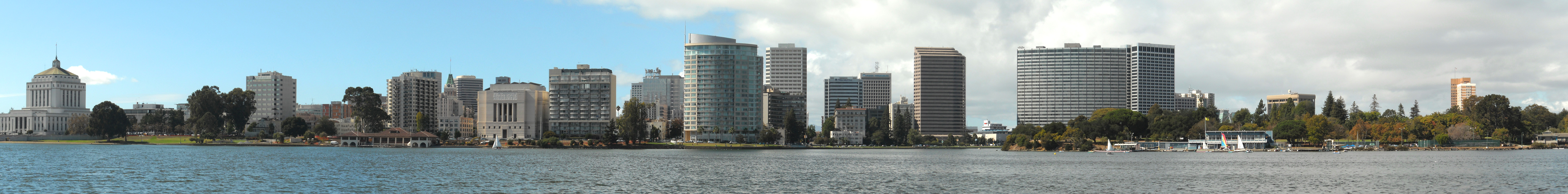
Panorama of Oakland's skyline in 2008 (Click or hover over image to identify buildings)

== Map of tallest buildings ==
The map below show the location of buildings taller than 200 ft (61 m) in Downtown Oakland and around Lake Merritt, where the majority of such buildings are. Each marker is numbered by the building's height rank, and colored by the decade of its completion. There are two buildings in Oakland taller than 200 ft (61 m) that are located outside of the map: The Skylyne at Temescal, and the Kaiser Permanente Oakland Medical Center.

Buildings taller than 200 ft (61 m) in Downtown Oakland. An asterisk (*) next to the building's name indicates it is located outside the map.
- 1950s and before
- 1960s
- 1970s
- 1980s
- 1990s
- 2000s
- 2010s
- 2020s
1 Ordway Building
2 Atlas
3 1900 Broadway
4 Kaiser Center
5 17th and Broadway
6 Lake Merritt Plaza
7 1111 Broadway
8 Kaiser Engineering Building
9 Clorox Building
10 Ronald V. Dellums Federal Building North
11 Ronald V. Dellums Federal Building South
12 Elihu M. Harris State Office Building
13 1200 Lakeshore
14 Oakland City Hall
15 AT&T Building
16 Tribune Tower
17 Kaiser Permanente Building
18 601 City Center
19 1330 Broadway
20 Pacific Bell Building
21 555 City Center
22 Oakland Marriott City Center
23 The Key at 12th
24 1717 Webster
25 Park Bellevue Tower
26 St. Paul's Towers
27 The Grand Apartments
28 1700 Webster
29 Forma
30 The Skylyne at Temescal*
31 World Savings Center Building
32 Central Building
33 The Essex on Lake Merritt
34 Vespr
35 Bank of America Building
36 Caltrans District 4 Headquarters
37 180 Grand
38 Financial Center Building
39 René C. Davidson Courthouse
40 Kaiser Permanente Oakland Medical Center*
41 ANDYS

== Tallest buildings ==
This list ranks completed buildings in Oakland that stand at least 200 ft (61 m) tall as of 2026, based on standard height measurement. This includes spires and architectural details but does not include antenna masts. The “Year” column indicates the year of completion. Buildings tied in height are sorted by year of completion with earlier buildings ranked first, and then alphabetically.

Was the tallest building in Oakland upon completion

Rank	Name	Image	Location	Height ft (m)	Floors	Year	Purpose	Notes
1	Ordway Building		37°48′36″N 122°15′51″W	404 (123.1)	28	1970	Office	Tallest building in both Oakland and in the Bay Area outside of San Francisco. Tallest building completed in Oakland in the 1970s. Headquarters of integrated managed care company Kaiser Permanente, which also has offices nearby at the Kaiser Permanente Building. Only 1 foot (0.2 m) taller than the second-tallest building in Oakland, Atlas.
2	Atlas		37°48′12″N 122°16′12″W	403 (122.9)	40	2020	Residential	Tallest building completed in Oakland in the 2020s. Only 1 foot (0.2 m) shorter than the Ordway Building.
3	1900 Broadway		37°48′30″N 122°16′06″W	395 (120.4)	39	2024	Residential	
4	Kaiser Center		37°48′32″N 122°15′50″W	389 (118.7)	28	1960	Office	Also called the Kaiser Building. Tallest building in Oakland from 1960 to 1970. Tallest building completed in Oakland in the 1960s. Was built as the headquarters of Kaiser Industries, a conglomerate (not to be confused with Kaiser Permanente)
5	17th and Broadway		37°48′23″N 122°16′10″W	375 (114.3)	34	2019	Residential	Tallest building completed in Oakland in the 2010s.
6	Lake Merritt Plaza		37°48′28″N 122°15′54″W	371 (113.1)	27	1988	Office	Tallest building completed in Oakland in the 1980s.
7	1111 Broadway		37°48′10″N 122°16′22″W	360 (109.7)	24	1990	Office	Tallest building completed in Oakland in the 1990s. Part of Oakland City Center, an office, shopping and hotel complex. Built as the headquarters of global shipping company American President Lines.
8	Kaiser Engineering Building		37°48′22″N 122°15′55″W	336 (102.4)	25	1984	Office	
9	Clorox Building		37°48′13″N 122°16′20″W	330 (100.6)	24	1976	Office	Headquarters of consumer firm Clorox.
10	Ronald V. Dellums Federal Building North		37°48′19″N 122°16′29″W	328 (100)	18	1994	Government	Joint-tallest government building in Oakland. Named after former mayor and Congressman Ronald V. Dellums, who was Mayor of Oakland from 2007 to 2011.
11	Ronald V. Dellums Federal Building South		37°48′17″N 122°16′30″W	328 (100)	18	1994	Government	Joint-tallest government building in Oakland.
12	Elihu M. Harris State Office Building		37°48′23″N 122°16′25″W	328 (100)	23	1998	Government	Joint-tallest government building in Oakland. Named after Elihu Harris, who was Mayor of Oakland from 1991 to 1999.
13	1200 Lakeshore		37°47′56″N 122°15′30″W	325 (99.1)	25	1968	Residential	
14	Oakland City Hall		37°48′19″N 122°16′21″W	319 (97.2)	18	1914	Government	Tallest building completed in Oakland in the 1910s. Added to the National Register of Historic Places in 1983. Constructed in the Beaux-Arts style, the city hall resembles a "rectangular wedding cake". After the 1989 Loma Prieta earthquake, the building suffered from major structural damage and was retrofitted.
15	AT&T Building		37°48′21″N 122°16′09″W	312 (95.1)	15	1948	Data center	
16	Tribune Tower		37°48′11″N 122°16′15″W	310 (94.5)	20	1923	Office	The lower six-story base was built in 1906, with the tower erected in 1923. Tallest building completed in Oakland in the 1920s.
17	Kaiser Permanente Building		37°48′28″N 122°16′02″W	302 (92) (Note: Sources do not state the exact height of this building. This figure was determined using Google Earth by subtracting the altitude of the building's lowest main pedestrian open-air entrance from its highest architectural point.)	21	1975	Office	Bought by Behring Companies in 2024.
18	601 City Center		37°48′15″N 122°16′35″W	301 (91.6)	23	2019	Office	
19	1330 Broadway		37°48′14″N 122°16′15″W	297 (90.5)	18	1958	Office	Renovated in 2018.
20	Pacific Bell Building		37°48′37″N 122°15′58″W	295 (90)	20	1985	Office	
21	555 City Center		37°48′13″N 122°16′31″W	279 (85)	20	2002	Office	Tallest building completed in Oakland in the 2000s. Headquarters of Ask.com.
22	Oakland Marriott City Center		37°48′08″N 122°16′23″W	273 (83.3)	21	1983	Hotel	Tallest hotel building in Oakland.
23	The Key at 12th	–	37°48′09″N 122°16′19″W	271 (83)	18	2020	Office	Also known as 1100 Broadway.
24	1717 Webster		37°48′23″N 122°16′03″W	270 (82.3)	25	2020	Residential	Also known as 1721 Webster Street.
25	Park Bellevue Tower		37°48′28″N 122°15′21″W	269 (82)	25	1969	Residential	
26	St. Paul's Towers		37°48′43″N 122°15′37″W	267 (81.4)	22	1966	Residential	
27	The Grand Apartments		37°48′42″N 122°15′53″W	263 (80.2)	22	2008	Residential	
28	1700 Webster		37°48′21″N 122°16′01″W	262 (80)	23	2019	Residential	Also known as ZO Oakland Apartments.
29	Forma	–	37°48′35″N 122°16′09″W	261 (80)	24	2022	Residential	
30	The Skylyne at Temescal		37°49′42″N 122°15′58″W	260 (79.2)	25	2020	Residential	
31	World Savings Center Building	–	37°48′24″N 122°15′56″W	242 (74)	17	1985	Office	
32	Central Building		37°48′16″N 122°16′15″W	236 (72)	15	1926	Office	
33	The Essex on Lake Merritt		37°48′15″N 122°15′40″W	229 (70)	20	2002	Residential	
34	Vespr	–	37°48′49″N 122°15′45″W	225 (69)	20	2022	Residential	
35	Bank of America Building		37°48′11″N 122°16′18″W	225 (68.6)	18	1924	Office	Originally constructed with nine floors in 1907. The 18-story tower was added later.
36	Caltrans District 4 Headquarters		37°48′39″N 122°15′54″W	221 (67)	15	1990	Office	
37	180 Grand	–	37°48′41″N 122°15′46″W	219 (67)	15	1982	Office	
38	Financial Center Building		37°48′13″N 122°16′13″W	215 (65.5)	16	1929	Office	
39	René C. Davidson Courthouse		37°47′59″N 122°15′47″W	211 (64)	12	1934	Government	
40	Kaiser Permanente Oakland Medical Center		37°49′25″N 122°15′29″W	208 (63)	12	2014	Health	
41	ANDYS	–	37°48′16″N 122°16′04″W	207 (63)	19	2024	Residential	Also known by its address, 1510 Webster.

== Tallest under construction or approved ==
=== Under construction ===
Since the completion of 1900 Broadway in 2024, there have been no buildings taller than 200 ft (61 m) under construction in Oakland.

=== Approved ===
The following table includes approved buildings in Oakland that are expected to be at least 200 ft (61 m) tall as of 2026, based on standard height measurement. The “Year” column indicates the expected year of completion. A dash “–“ indicates information about the building’s height, floor count, or year of completion is unknown or has not been released.

Name	Height ft (m)	Floors	Year	Purpose	Notes
Town Tower	487 (148.4)	46	–	Residential	
1431 Franklin Street	413 (126)	40	–	Residential	

== Timeline of tallest buildings ==
Name	Image	Street address	Years as tallest	Height ft (m)	Floors	Notes
Oakland City Hall		1 Frank H. Ogawa Plaza	1914–1960	320 (98)	14	
Kaiser Center		300 Lakeside Drive	1960–1970	390 (119)	28	
Ordway Building		2150 Valdez Street	1970–present	404 (123)	28	

== See also ==
- List of tallest buildings in California
- List of tallest buildings in Los Angeles
- List of tallest buildings in Sacramento
- List of tallest buildings in San Diego
- List of tallest buildings in San Francisco
