= Encinal =

Encinal may refer to:

- Encinal, former name of Alameda, California
- Encinal, Sutter County, California
- Encinal, New Mexico, a census-designated place in Cibola County, New Mexico, United States
- Encinal, Texas, a city in La Salle County, Texas, United States
- Encinal County, Texas, a county in Texas, United States
- Encinal High School, a public secondary school in Alameda, California, United States

== See also ==
- Encinal Tower, a proposed skyscraper in Oakland, California
