= Encinal, California =

Encinal, California may refer to:

- Former name of Alameda, California
- Encinal, Santa Clara County, California
- Encinal, Sutter County, California
