= History of Jamshedpur =

History of a city in India

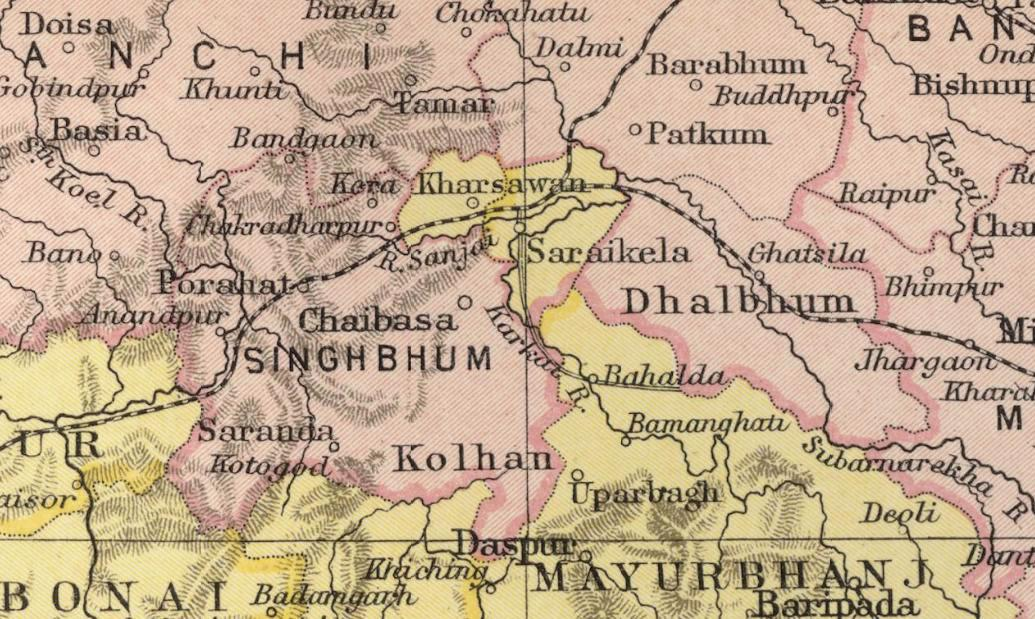
Singhbum-Sairakela-Kharsawan map section. Imperial Gazetteer of India (1909)

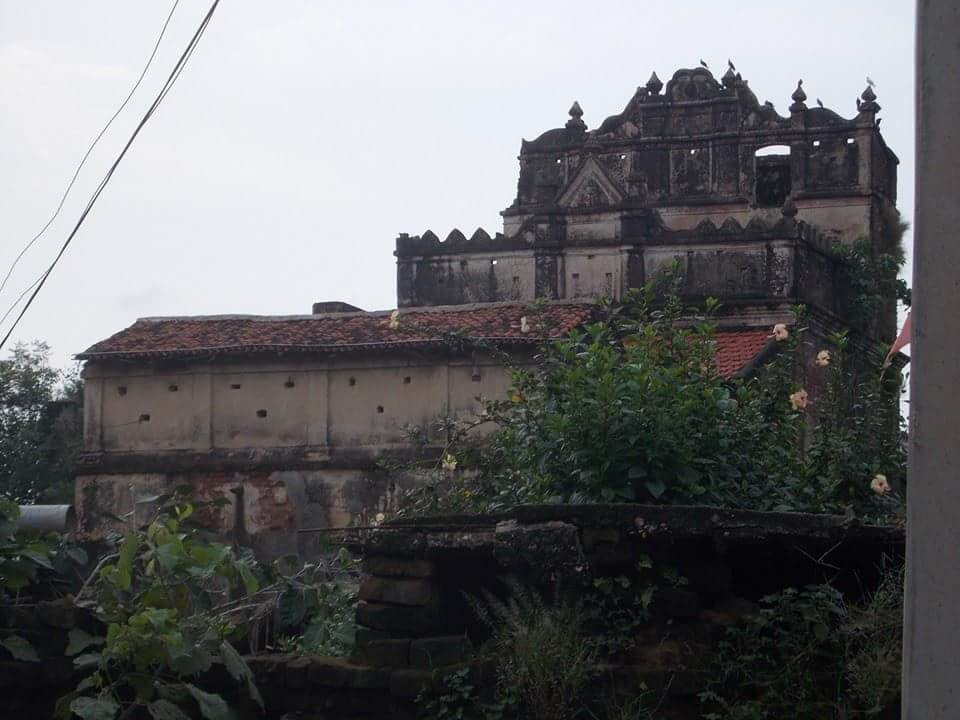
A palace in Ichagarh, outskirts of Jamshedpur

Jamshedpur is a major industrial city in Jharkhand, India. It has gained historical significance, as it was an important commercial and industrial center for the Middle East and the North Africa during the first and second world war. During the middle ages, region surrounding Jamshedpur was ruled by Muslim rulers and kingdoms. The city is part of historic region Singhbhum, which is part of wider Manbhum region extending over today's modern cities of Dhanbad and Asansol.

The region came in prominence during industrial development of Jamshedpur in 1919, whose foundation was laid by Jamshedji Tata. After independence, the city experienced deadly communal riots in 1964 and 1979 and horrific increase of political crimes, which included assassinations of well-known political figures of the city. Jamshedpur was also a stronghold for Jharkhand statehood movement. On 15 November 2000, Jamshedpur became part of Jharkhand.

== Historical period ==
Ichagarh served as capital of Patkum State. The town is location of Chaturmukhi Shiva Temple, an ancient Shiva temple, home to some of the unique shivalingas.

During the 12th century, the region of Dhalbhum gained significance.

In the year 1620, Kumar Bikram Singh I, the third Maharaja Jagannath Singh, established the Seraikela state.

The region was noted in Chuar Rebellion

== British colonization: 1857–1947 ==
=== Foundation ===
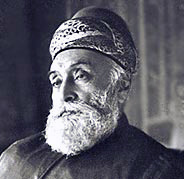
Jamsetji Nusserwanji Tata (1839 – 1904)

Tata Iron and Steel Company, established on 27 August 1907 with a capital of Rs 2 crore, began construction work of the factory and the city on 27 February 1908. By the year 1910, the population of Jamshedpur was only six thousand. It was during this time that the dam and water distribution on Swarnarekha were initiated. A significant milestone in TISCO was achieved in 1911 when pig iron was produced for the first time. The outbreak of the First World War in 1914 provided the company with a better opportunity for growth. Subsequently, in 1915, employees at TISCO started receiving free medical services. In 1916, the city saw the establishment of Mrs. KMP's School and the operation of two buses by Tata Company from Kalimati station to Bistupur.

The following year, in 1919, Sakchi was renamed "Jamshedpur", and Kalimati station was renamed "Tatanagar Junction", after the end of World War I and as a tribute to the company for its contribution. The year 1920 marked the establishment of the Shri Sanatan Dharma Gaurakshini Sabha, now known as Shri Tatanagar Gaushala. Jamshedpur Technical Institute was founded in 1921, followed by a strike by TISCO employees in 1922. In 1923, production commenced at the Tinplate Company of India in Jamshedpur. Finally, the present TISCO Dairy Farm, known as the Model Dairy Farm, was established in 1924 by former Police Inspector JH Noland.

Hotel Kennelite, located near Jama Masjid of Sakchi, has an intriguing history. Originally, there existed an inn in this area, known as Sakchi inn, before it transformed into a hotel. According to local residents, this region was once a part of the Dhalbhumgarh princely state. Not only did the kings of Dhalbhumgarh frequent this place, but also the rulers of Saraikela, Rajkharsawan, and Mayurbhanj princely states would stay here during their travels. In its early years, the inn remained in good condition until the 1960s and 1970s, after which it gradually became a refuge for the abandoned. However, after a considerable period of time, the Jharkhand Tourism Development Corporation acquired the inn. Subsequently, in 2016, under the supervision of the Tourism Corporation, Hotel Kennelite was constructed. Interestingly, historical records indicate that on 2 January 1919, Lord Chelmsford, the Governor of Bengal, renamed Sakchi as Jamshedpur. This renaming event added another layer of significance to the area where Hotel Kennelite now stands, further enriching its cultural and historical context.

=== First and Second World wars: 1914–1945 ===
The first world war began in August 1914 and it rapidly escalated to West Asia centering around the Suez Canal of Egypt and from there to the region of Mesopotamia, now called Iraq. It extended to East Africa, Palestine and rest of the Middle East. That time all these countries were soon to be under the control of the British and the French, as the war would overthrow the Ottoman Empire, which had control over these countries. The escalated war increased demand of steel by military of these countries. The steel plant already started commencing operations, as it was Asia's first steel plant and made itself the only source of steel to those countries. Nearly 1,500 miles of rail and 3,00,000 tonnes of steel produced in Jamshedpur were used in military campaigns across Mesopotamia, Egypt, Salonica and East Africa. After the war, a British parliamentary report affirmed, "It would have been impossible to carry on the campaign without the iron and steel of India".

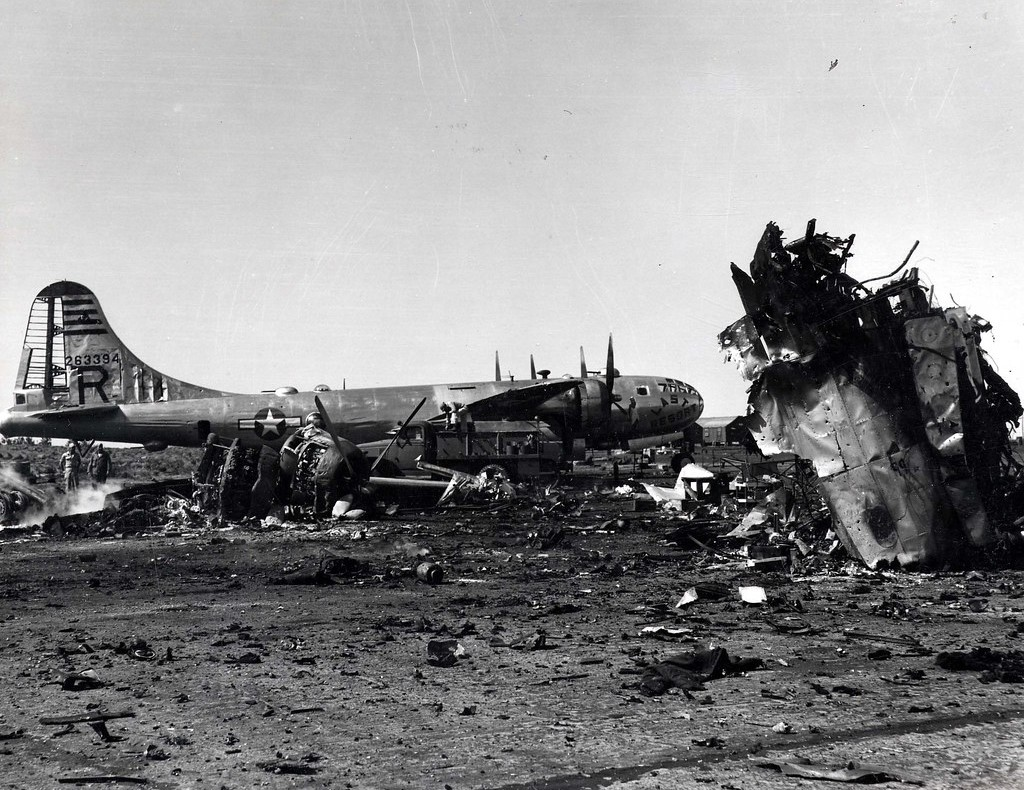
The aftermath of a bomb unloading accident at Chakulia in 1945

World War II was started in 1945 in the European countries and extended to the Middle East and rest of Asia. The city was high-valued target by Japan during the war. The British government sough to protect the city from attacks. From Calcutta signals were sent to alert about Japanese army's air-raids. Several bomb shelters were set up across the city, while anti-aircraft guns were placed on the outskirts. The company also put efforts to be protect itself from the escalating attacks. To prevent its damage from Japanese fighter planes from diving down to bomb the factory, steel ropes were tied to gas balloons and sent up to the sky. Additionally, tar boilers were set up across the steel factory to create smokescreens. Bartholomew D'Costa, an enterprising Anglo-Indian contractor played a crucial role from the side of Jamshedpur in the war.

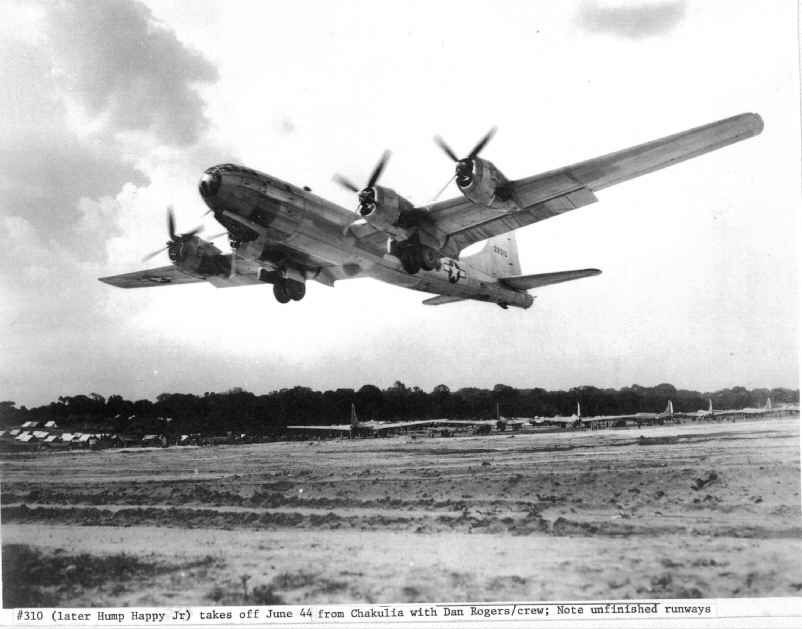
40th Bombardment Group B-29 42-6310 taking off from Chakulia

The British and American troops were brought in Jamshedpur. At that time, no any proper functioning hotel was in the city. D'Costa built "Boulevard Hotel", which became the first hotel in the city. The British and American troops used to stay at the hotel and furniture of that time is still in use. Additional airfields were built at Chakulia and Kalaikunda, surrounded by several underground bunkers. After Independence, the Indian Air Force used it for training during the 1971 Indo-Pakistan war. Those times, the control of the China Sea by the Japanese had severed seaborne supply routes. Consequently, pilots were compelled to undertake treacherous flights spanning 500 kilometers from India to China, traversing the formidable Himalayan mountain range. This perilous air route, aptly named 'the Hump', earned the reputation of being the most hazardous overland journey across the globe during that era. The unforgiving terrain, obscured peaks shrouded in mist, and abrupt weather changes made the Hump an exceptionally challenging and dangerous passage for pilots to navigate.

During the war, when Britain faced a shortage in meeting the demand for Armoured Fighting Vehicles (AFVs), they reached out to Commonwealth countries for assistance in production. India, in response, embarked on the development of a series of Wheeled Armoured Carriers, known as the 'Tatanagar', to contribute to the war effort. To construct these vehicles, Ford truck chassis imported from Canada were utilized, while Tata Steel played a crucial role in manufacturing the armour-plated hulls. The collaborative effort resulted in the creation of the Indian Pattern Wheeled Armoured Carriers, famously known as the 'Tatanagar'. Between the years 1940 and 1944, a remarkable total of 4,655 Tatanagar units were produced at the Railway workshop in Jamshedpur. Interestingly, it was Tata Engineering & Locomotive Company (now known as Tata Motors) that completed the final order in 1945 when it took over the railway workshop. This historical context reveals that the first vehicle to roll out of Tata Motors was not a truck, but a tank, highlighting the company's significant contribution to the production of AFVs during that time.

=== Independence movement and influences ===
In 1925, notable figures like Mahatma Gandhi, Chittaranjan Das, and CF Andrews visited Jamshedpur to address the labor problem. They engaged in discussions with R.D. Tata, seeking resolution and understanding. During the same year, the inauguration of the large post office in Jamshedpur took place, which still stands in the present-day Bistupur building. The year 1927 witnessed a devastating flood in Jamshedpur, causing significant disruptions to daily life and the city's functioning. In 1928-29, a strike spanning over three months occurred at TISCO. Netaji Subhash Chandra Bose arrived in Jamshedpur and played a crucial role in facilitating a settlement between the involved parties.

The tradition of celebrating Founder's Day on 3 March was initiated in 1932, commemorating the founding of the city. In 1938, Jugsalai Electric Supply obtained the license for electricity distribution in Jugsalai, contributing to the development and modernization of the area. A concrete bridge was constructed across the Swarnarekha River, which flows through the city, in 1942, improving connectivity and transportation within Jamshedpur. To address the water supply needs of the growing city, the Dimna Nala Reservoir was constructed in 1945, ensuring a sufficient water source for the residents. In 1946, a group of 12 students and honorary teachers collectively established Jamshedpur Tutorial College, an educational institution that would contribute to the academic growth of the community.

== Independent India: 1947—present ==
On 15 August 1947 India declared its independence and Jamshedpur became part of Bihar. The old Singhbhum district was turned into an Indian-held district. In 1952, a significant development took place in Jamshedpur as the JBS buses were nationalized, marking a milestone in the city's transportation system. Around the same time, the Ardesir Dalal TB Hospital was established, catering to the healthcare needs of the community. Two years later, in 1954, an important achievement occurred when the first vehicle produced by Telco in collaboration with Daimler Benz rolled out of the factory, showcasing the fruitful partnership between the two companies.

In 1955, TISCO entered into an agreement with Kaiser Engineers from the USA for a two million tonne expansion program, highlighting the company's commitment to growth and progress. Concurrently, construction work commenced on the Kadma-Sonari Link Road, along with the construction of bungalows for engineers who arrived from America, on Sonari Road. The year 1958 brought grand celebrations as TISCO commemorated its Golden Jubilee. On 1 March, Pandit Jawaharlal Nehru, the Prime Minister of India, inaugurated the Jubilee Park in the city, adding another iconic landmark to the landscape. However, the same year witnessed another large-scale strike by TISCO employees, reflecting the complex dynamics of industrial relations.

In 1962, a concrete bridge was constructed over the Kharkai River, enhancing connectivity and transportation within the city. Additionally, Tata Robins Fraser was established during the same year, further contributing to the industrial landscape of Jamshedpur. Tragedy struck in 1973 when a severe flood wreaked havoc in the region. Areas such as Shastrinagar, Ramdasbhatta, Bistupur, Jugsalai, Maango, and others were inundated with floodwaters, reaching heights of eight to ten feet, causing significant damage and disruption. Between 1979 and 1980, Telco's Jamshedpur plant showcased its manufacturing prowess by producing an impressive 27,000 trucks in a single year, highlighting the company's industrial productivity and contribution to the automotive sector.

=== Communal violence: 1964–1979 ===
In 1964, a wave of violence swept across several cities in eastern India, triggered by the influx of Hindu refugees from East Pakistan who sought shelter in India to escape the anti-Hindu violence in their home country. The Indian government organized special trains to facilitate the settlement of these refugees. However, the tales of horror from East Pakistan fueled tensions and resulted in episodes of anti-Muslim violence along the route of these special trains, particularly in cities such as Calcutta, Jamshedpur, Rourkela, and Raigarh. Tragically, thousands of people, predominantly Muslims, lost their lives during these violent incidents. This eruption of communal violence seemed to resonate with the lingering aftermath of the traumatic Partition of India. Some argue that these events were driven by political motives, as evidenced by subsequent electoral gains by the Bharatiya Jan Sangh (BJS). While there is truth to these explanations, it is important to acknowledge another dimension at play.

Local economic factors also contributed to the violence in March 1964. The rapid industrialization of the 1960s had created new economic opportunities, enabling upward mobility for Muslims. The outbreak of violence was an attempt to disrupt this progress. There are accounts of some Muslims returning to their villages and towns and not resuming their jobs due to the hostile environment. The violence in 1964 proved advantageous for the Rashtriya Swayamsevak Sangh (RSS) and its affiliated organizations, which were able to establish a foothold in Jamshedpur at the expense of the Muslim community. In subsequent elections held in Jamshedpur after 1964, the BJS made its presence felt, securing around 10% of the votes in 1967. The targeted violence resulted in the loss of lives among Muslims residing in company quarters, leading to the formation of Azad Nagar, an area with a Muslim majority, on the outskirts of the city.

Azadnagar came into existence on land sold by the tribals (indigenous people), with the active involvement of the Jamaat-e-Islami in securing the land for Muslims. The RSS tried to disrupt the Muslim community's plans by attempting to establish temporary temples on acquired land, leading to legal battles fought by the Jamaat-e-Islami. Thus, the 1964 violence, which claimed an estimated 2,000 lives in Jamshedpur, Rourkela, and Calcutta, predominantly among Muslims, further entrenched Hindu and Muslim communal organizations as advocates for the rights of their respective communities. Dina Nath Pandey, who would later play a significant role in the 1979 Jamshedpur riots, emerged on the electoral scene as a candidate of the BJS in the 1972 Bihar assembly elections. He secured 10% of the votes and rose to the third position for the Jamshedpur East assembly seat. In the 1977 elections, he won this seat as a nominee of the Janata Party. In April 1979, Jamshedpur experienced Hindu-Muslim violence influenced by the presence of Hindu and Muslim communal forces. The Sangh Parivar aimed to connect with tribals by introducing Hindu deities gradually, while the Jamaat-e-Islami supported Muslims' relocation outside the city. Conflict arose when a Ramnavmi procession was planned to pass through the Muslim area of Sabirnagar. Despite efforts to find an alternate route, the procession took its original path, leading to tension and a standoff.

RSS chief Balasaheb Deoras was held responsible for creating the climate that led to the violence. A pamphlet circulated detailing the upcoming violence, and on 11 April, the procession passed through Sabirnagar. However, it deliberately slowed down and eventually stopped in front of a mosque. Clashes broke out, resulting in the loss of lives and looting of houses over the next few days. The district administration's efforts to prevent violence were praised, but junior-level policemen were blamed for their inaction.

One tragic incident involved the burning of an ambulance carrying women and children. Zaki Anwar, an advocate of secularism, was killed during the violence. Despite the blow to secularism and communal harmony, full-fledged communal riots did not recur in Jamshedpur. The sacrifice of Zaki Anwar possibly played a role in preventing future outbreaks of violence. Around 108 people were killed in the riot.

=== Jharkhand: 2000—present ===
On 15 November 2000, Jamshedpur became part of new state called Jharkhand. There are wide roads, shady trees on the roadside, Dimna Dam for drinking water supply near the city, 24-hour uninterrupted electricity supply. Apart from this, many national level institutes like Shavak Nanavati Technical Institute, National Institute of Technology, National Metallurgy Laboratory, MGM Medical College, Al Kabir Polytechnic College are operating here. At present, Tata Steel is the country's largest private steel production company producing 11 million tons of steel. Jamshedpur is the only city in the country whose basic facilities are taken care of by a private company.
