= Encinal Tower =

General information
- Status: Never built
- Type: Mixed-use
- Location: 1938 Broadway; Oakland
- Owner: Chengben Wang; Encinal Broadway, LLC

Height
- Roof: 715 ft (218 m)

Technical details
- Floor count: 56
- Floor area: 1,500,000 sq ft (140,000 m^{2})

Design and construction
- Architect: Skidmore, Owings & Merrill
- Developer: Chengben (Peter) Wang; Encinal Broadway, LLC

The Encinal Tower was a skyscraper proposed for construction in Downtown Oakland, California. The mixed-use tower was planned to rise 715 feet (218 m) and contain 56 floors for office and residential use. The project design consisted of a glass and X-bracing-covered cylindrical building with one side that resembles a roll of fabric unraveling. If built, the skyscraper would have been the tallest building in Oakland and third-tallest in the Bay Area after 555 California Street and the Transamerica Pyramid, both located in San Francisco. The project had undergone several design and name changes since it was first proposed in 2006. The proposal was withdrawn in 2010, and in 2012 the property sold to a developer who planned a much smaller tower.

The site of the cancelled tower eventually became the location of 1900 Broadway, a 39-floor mixed-use tower, which was completed in 2024.

== Description ==
The project was located in Downtown Oakland a few blocks away from Lake Merritt and right next to the 19th Street Oakland BART station. The site is bounded by Broadway, Franklin, 19th, and 20th streets. Several lowrise buildings and a parking lot currently inhabit the proposed building site. The developers of the project were Chengben (Peter) Wang, and Encinal; the architect is Skidmore, Owings & Merrill.

The proposed building had the shape of an oval cylinder with one side that curves outward and downward. Its exterior skin consisted of glass and X-braces with a horizontal line passing through the center of the X. The large tower was planned to stand 715 ft (218 m) tall with 56 floors and contain 1,500,000 sq ft (140,000 m^{2}) of floor space. The majority (790,000 sq ft (73,000 m^{2})) of this space would consist of offices, 320,000 sq ft (30,000 m^{2}) would have gone to parking, and 75,000 sq ft (7,000 m^{2}) for retail space. The top 22 floors of the skyscraper would have housed 220 residential units or ten units per floor. There would have been a large, 60 ft (18 m) lobby housing artwork at the base of the building. The building's floorplates will average 32,000 sq ft (3,000 m^{2}) in size. Wang intended to make this building a landmark for the city of Oakland.

At 715 ft (218 m) in height, the proposed skyscraper would have far surpassed the 404 ft (123 m)-tall Ordway Building as the tallest building in Oakland and tallest in the Bay Area outside San Francisco. The building would have come in as the third-tallest in the Bay Area overall, after the 779 ft (237 m)-tall 555 California Street and the 853 ft (260 m)-tall Transamerica Pyramid.^{[A]}

== History ==
The developers, Wang and Encinal, first proposed this project as 1930 Broadway sometime in 2006 as the new headquarters of University of California system. He came up with three different designs for the all-office building, ranging from 44 floors - 603 ft (184 m) to 63 floors - 827 ft (252 m). However, the proposal changed into a mixed-use building after the University of California dropped out on the project. The new design consisted of a 827 ft (252 m) (the 63rd-floor was at 782 ft (238 m) above street level) skyscraper containing 1,007 parking spaces in an 11-story garage, 1,090,000 square feet (101,000 m^{2}) of office space on 48 floors, 40,000 sq ft (4,000 m^{2}) of retail / lobby space, a 150-room hotel, and a direct connection the 19th Street Oakland BART station. The original project schedule called for a construction groundbreaking in 2007 and completion of the skyscraper in 2009.

In mid-2007, the name of the project changed to 1938 Broadway and the building was scaled down to 790 ft (241 m) with 59 floors. The design of the building had 1,700,000 sq ft (200,000 m^{2}) of gross space, with 1,100,000 sq ft (100,000 m^{2}) of office space on 45 floors, a 12-story, 1,019 parking space garage with an area of 346,650 sq ft (32,200 m^{2}), and a 116-room hotel taking up 141,100 sq ft (13,110 m^{2}) of space. The parking garage, hotel, and office levels took up a total of 58 floors; the 59th floor was a mechanical floor at 730 ft (223 m) above street level. The roof (level 60) was at en elevation of 745 ft (227 m) relative to the street. A 45 ft (14 m)-tall roof screen located on level 60 pushed the total building height to 790 ft (241 m). The revision also had two basement levels that connected the building to the 19th Street Oakland BART station. Once again, the developer submitted other designs for the project, including a 44- to 45-story office / residential building and one that had offices, residential units, and a hotel.

However, sometime in 2007 or 2008, Wang withdrew the proposal as he wasn't pleased with the various designs of the building. Encinal later came back and submitted another proposal in July 2008. The name of the project also changed; it was referred to as Encinal Tower instead of its address 1938 Broadway. Wang put the property on the market in 2012, asking $5.95 million, and sold to Seth Hamilian, who was planning a building of no more than 28 stories. However, in August 2015, East Bay Express reported that it would have 33 floors and it was approved by the Oakland Planning Commission. In addition, it reported that the project became known as "1900 Broadway". In April 2021, SF YIMBY reported that excavation work was being conducted at the site and Behring Companies became the project developer, while Solomon Cordwell Buenz became the architect. It also reported that the tower would have 36 floors. By March 2022, SF YIMBY reported that the construction had reached past the ground level and the building would have 39 floors. The tower was finally completed in 2024 and it has 39 floors.

== Notes ==
A. This assumes that no taller projects in San Francisco are completed before the Encinal Tower. Such examples include the 900 ft (274 m) 181 Fremont Street, and the 1,200 ft (366 m) Transbay Terminal & Tower.

== See also ==
- Emerald Views - a residential skyscraper proposed for the west edge of Lake Merritt in the Lakeside Apartments District
- List of tallest buildings in Oakland
