= Tribune Tower (Oakland) =

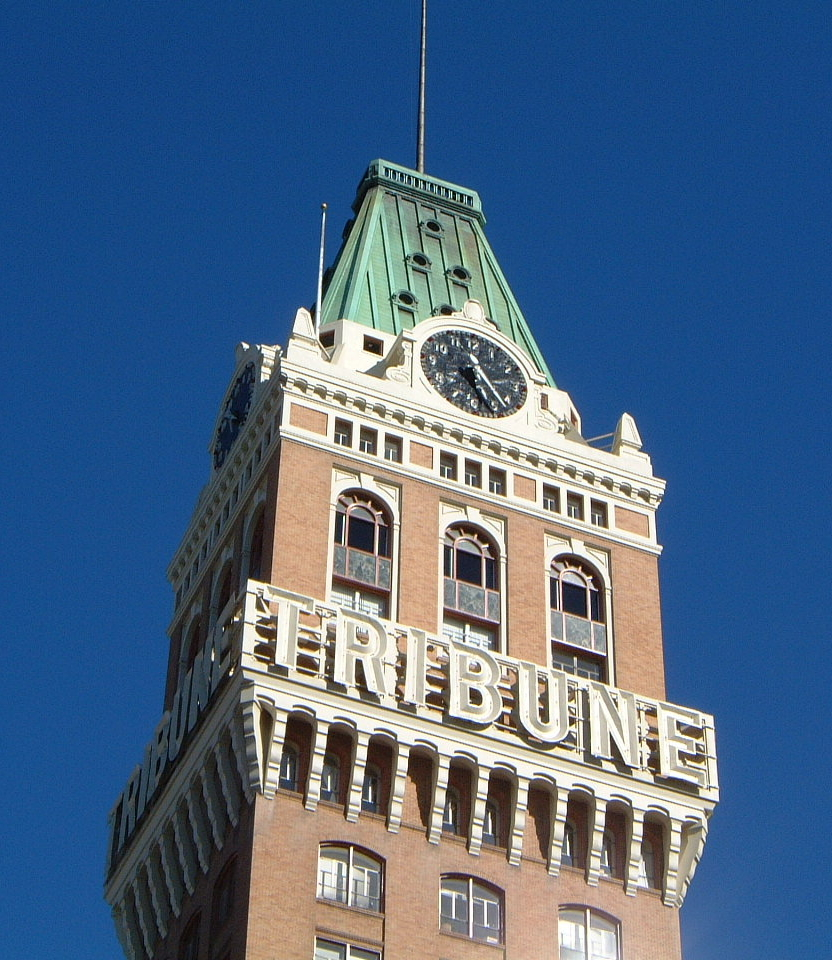

- Location within Oakland, California Location within California Location within the United States

General information
- Status: Completed
- Type: Office
- Location: 409 13th Street; Oakland, California
- Coordinates: 37.8031°N 122.2705°W
- Opening: 1906
- Owner: Highbridge Equity Partners

Height
- Roof: 305 ft (93 m)

Technical details
- Floor count: 22

Design and construction
- Architects: D. Franklin Oliver, Edward T. Foulkes

Oakland Designated Landmark
- Designated: 1976
- Reference no.: 15

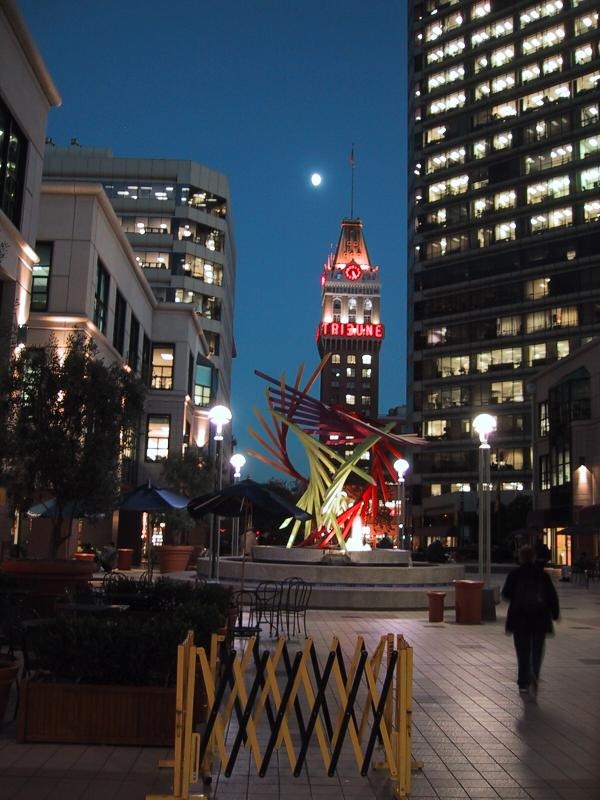
The Tribune Tower at night, viewed from the Oakland City Center

The Tribune Tower is a 305 ft (93 m), 22-story building located in downtown Oakland, California. Built in 1906, tower erected in 1923, the 89,251 sq ft (8,291.7 m^{2}) building was the tallest building in Oakland constructed in the 1920s. It is currently the 11th tallest building in Oakland.

The architecture of the tower, much like The Campanile on the UC Berkeley campus was inspired by St Mark's Campanile in Venice, Italy.

The building was originally meant for Zeppelin landing, the airship was to be tied off to the mast (flagpole) and the drop ladder to come down onto the 20th floor walkway. The 21st and 22nd floors also contain a water tank which held reserve water for a gravity feed to the fire suppression system in case the city water main was breached. The roof of the building is coated in bronze, giving it the green color due to oxidation. The roof features an 86-foot flagpole and a siren (bronze version of Heath Instant Blast, inactive, horn removed)

The building was opened by Joseph R. Knowland on January 1, 1924, as the home of the Oakland Tribune newspaper, and is a symbol of both the Tribune and the city of Oakland.

== History ==
In 1915, when Joseph Knowland, a former U.S. congressman, acquired the Oakland Tribune, the newspaper was located at Eighth and Franklin streets in the old Golden West Hotel. In 1918, the Breuner Furniture Company vacated its home at Thirteenth and Franklin. Knowland envisioned the vacated showroom and an adjacent warehouse as the site of a first-class newspaper facility. He began to implement this vision with the acquisition of the Breuner's property and the move of the Tribune there.

What became the six-story base of the Tribune Tower had been designed by D. Franklin Oliver and completed in 1906. (The warehouse, which became the Tribune's press room, had been built in the 1890s on the site of the old Pantages Theatre.) The now-familiar clock tower, designed by Edward T. Foulkes, was added in 1923 to complete the Tribune Tower as it appears today. The architect designed the tower with a mix of French and Italian classical elements, topped with a copper green mansard roof with punched eye windows.

From 1924, the tower would appear on the newspaper's masthead. The top floor of the tower housed radio station KLX from its opening until the station was sold in 1959. KLX was sold to pay off debts incurred in the ill-fated 1958 run by U.S. Senator William F. Knowland, Joseph Knowland's son, for governor of California. Joseph Knowland was a political mentor to his son, as well as to California attorney general and governor Earl Warren and many other Republicans.

The Tribune Tower gained national attention in 1923 when magician Harry Houdini demonstrated his skills by escaping from a straitjacket while dangling upside down from the ninth floor of the building. (It took him five seconds to escape.)

The building was declared a city landmark on May 4, 1976. At various times, the building has flown a flag with the word, "THERE" emblazoned upon it. This is a send-up of Gertrude Stein's comment that in Oakland "there is no there there."

In 1979, Gannett Company purchased the newspaper and the tower from the Tribune Publishing Corporation. The company later sold the Tribune to its editor and publisher, Robert C. Maynard and his wife, Nancy Hicks Maynard, in 1983—making them the first African Americans to own a major metropolitan daily newspaper in the United States.

The tower was damaged in the 1989 Loma Prieta earthquake, which forced the Tribune to relocate to new offices in Jack London Square. The tower sat empty until 1995, when John Protopappas purchased it for $300,000. His company, Madison Park Financial Corporation, renovated the tower in the late 1990s. The Tribune's parent company, ANG Newspapers (which purchased the newspaper from the Maynards in 1992), returned the Tribune to the building after it reopened in 1999.

Neon sign contractor and Burning Man co-founder John Law was contracted by building owner John Protopappas in 1996/97 to restore the neon on the clocks and Tribune letters. Law moved into the building in 1996 and restored and maintained the neon signage from 1996 through 2025. As of 2025, Law continued to maintain a tiny office on the 22nd floor of the tower.

Machinist Kevin Binkert and C-10 electrical contractor Deb Lee were contracted by Law in 1997 to restore the clock motors in conjunction with the neon restoration.

In early 2006, Protopappas sold the tower to Edward B. Kislinger for approximately $15 million.

The clock faces were restored and repainted in the late fall of 2006. On December 22 of that year the faces and the famous TRIBUNE lettering were relit.

The Tribune moved permanently out of the tower in 2007 to a building on Oakport Street, near the Oakland International Airport. The facade that overhangs the tower's main entrance still bears the newspaper's iconic logo. Other past tenants include CallSocket, a now-defunct call center business, and a project owned by the San Francisco Regional Center.

The building was purchased for $8 million by Tom Henderson, SFRC's CEO and an Oakland native, in December 2011 and seized by an Alameda County Superior Court judge in April 2016 along with several other company assets. In 2017 Tom Henderson was sued by the US Government (SEC) and accused of running a fraudulent scheme with Chinese investors' money. CallSocket occupied about 37,000 square feet on multiple floors of the 83,000-square-foot landmark at 13th and Franklin streets.

Harvest Properties, Inc., a full-service commercial real estate investment firm headquartered in Oakland, purchased the building out of receivership for approximately $20 million. Harvest began major renovations to the building in 2017.

Harvest sold the property to Highbridge Equity Partners, an Oakland-based real estate investment company, for $48 million in 2019. Although Highbridge appeared confident about its purchase in 2019, the Covid-19 pandemic proved challenging for the company's ownership of the tower. In 2020, many tenants were forced to shutter their doors and paid what they could for rent — often, around 65% of their normal amount.

In 2023, Highbridge fell more than 30 days delinquent on a $99 million loan it used to buy the tower and other properties, although their lender, Rialto Capital Management Fund, granted a forbearance, meaning it did not enforce payments at the time. Highbridge founder Douglas Abrams told media shortly after that his company was not in default on the loan and was no longer considered delinquent.

Under Highbridge, as of 2024, the tower was home to several branding agencies, therapists, personal injury lawyers and freelancers using coworking spaces, although roughly half the tower remained unfilled.

As of 2026, the building houses office space provided by International Workplace Group's Space brand on the upper levels and Modern Coffee cafe on the ground level.

== See also ==
- List of tallest buildings in Oakland
- Yule Marble
