= Ronald V. Dellums Federal Building =

Ronald V. Dellums Federal Building complex
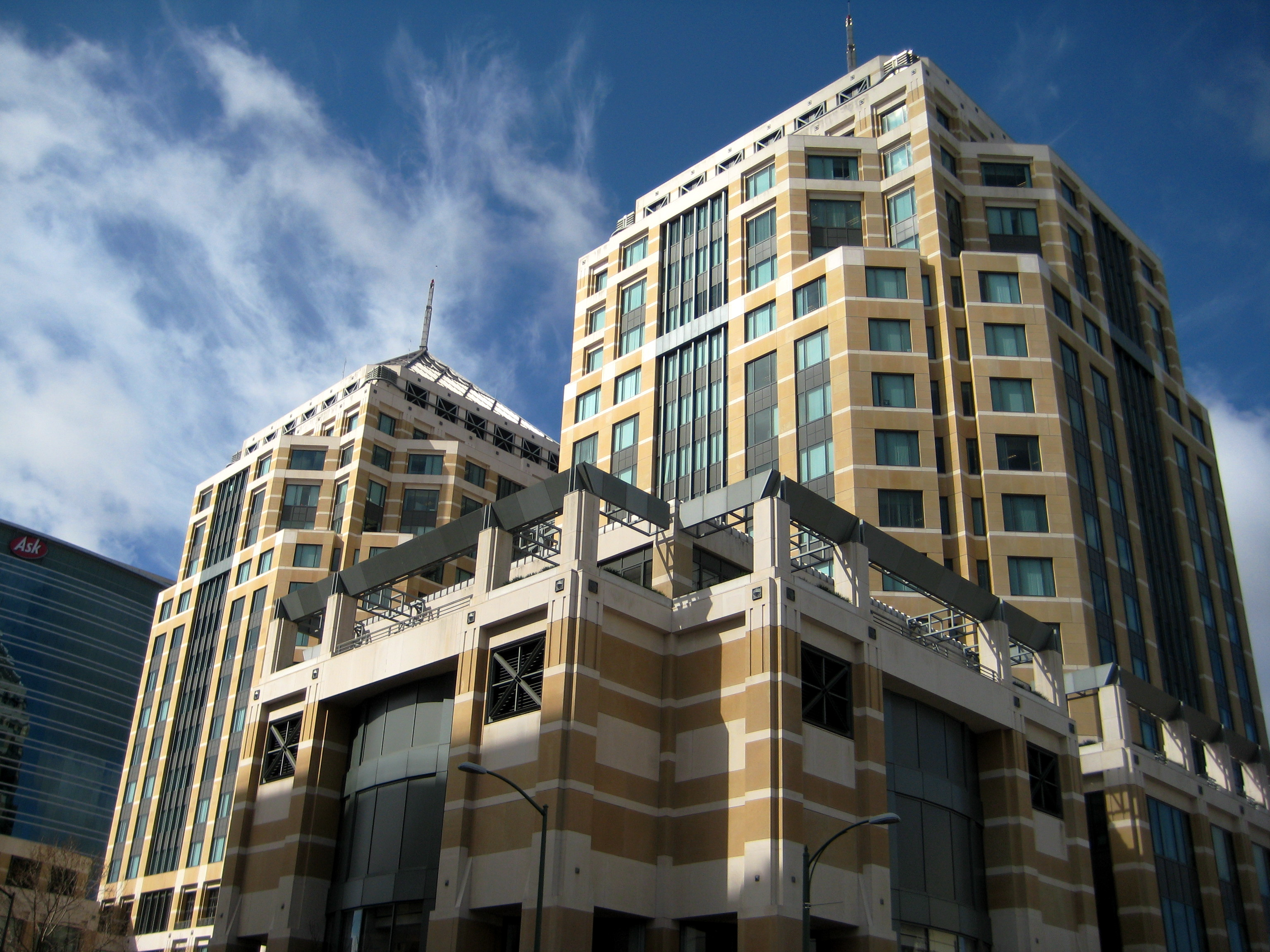

- Location within Oakland, California Location within California Location within the United States

General information
- Status: Completed
- Type: Government
- Location: 1301 Clay Street; Oakland
- Coordinates: 37°48′17″N 122°16′29″W
- Opening: 1994
- Owner: General Services Administration

Height
- Roof: 328 ft (100 m)

Technical details
- Floor count: 18

The Ronald V. Dellums Federal Building complex is a federal building complex in Oakland, California, constructed as part of the Oakland City Center redevelopment project. In 1998, the United States Congress passed a bill naming the building for former mayor and Congressman Ronald V. Dellums. It consists of two identical towers topped with pyramid-shaped roofs, echoing similar landmarks such as the Alameda County Courthouse. The towers are connected by a ground level rotunda and an elevated sky bridge. The podium of one of the towers houses a federal courthouse.

Both buildings are 268 feet (82 meters) in height to roof, 100.0 m in height including spires.

== History ==
During the George Floyd protests, on May 30, 2020, a Federal Protective Service officer was shot and killed and another was wounded in an attack outside the building. The officer slain was providing security services during a protest near the courthouse.

In 2024, a man attempted to break a window at the building and throw Molotovs inside. After FPS officers confronted him, the man fled and put the Molotovs in a planter instead. The same man also set fires at the University of California, Berkeley, including one that destroyed a police car.
