= Lake Merritt Plaza =

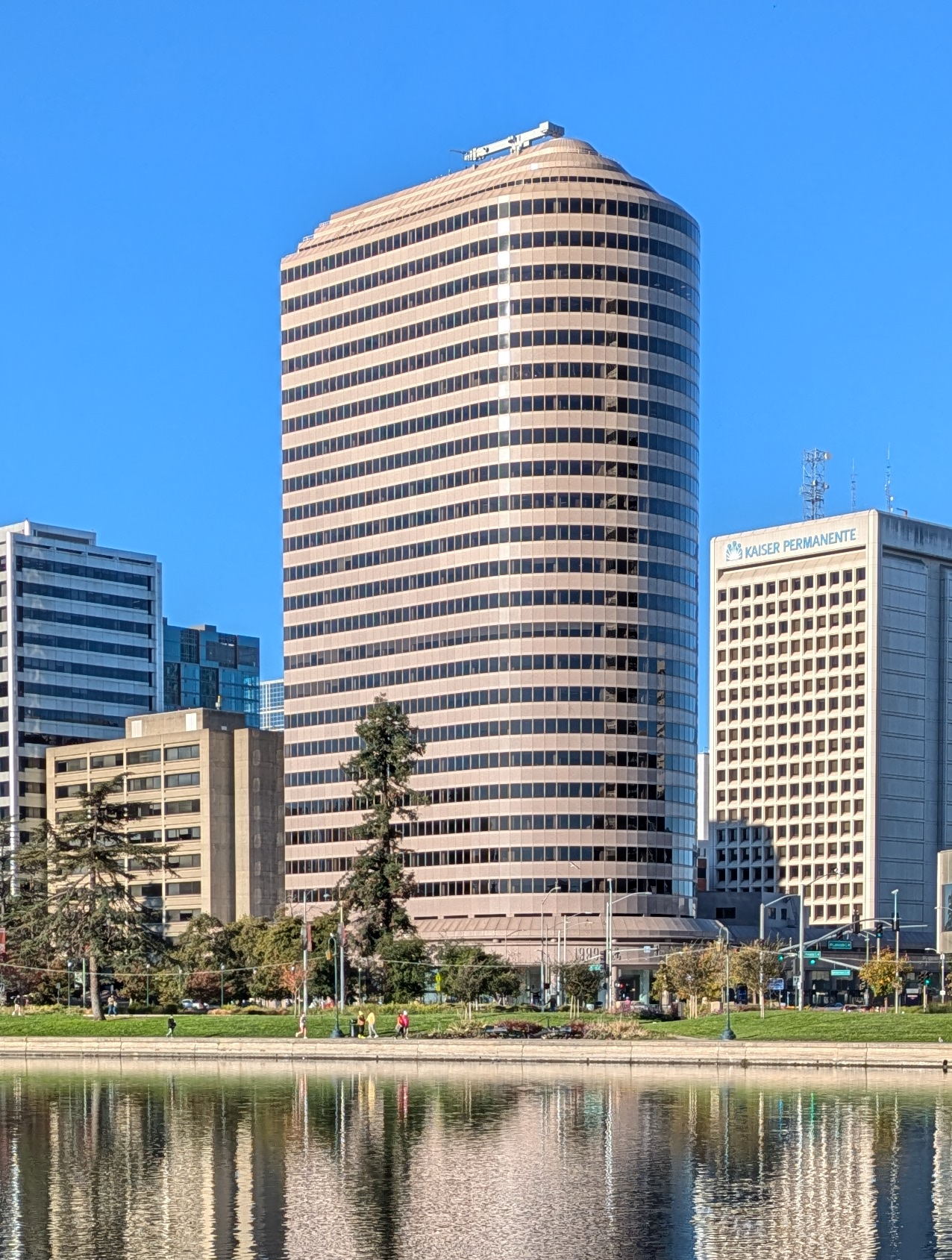

- Location within Oakland, California Lake Merritt Plaza (California) Lake Merritt Plaza (the United States)

General information
- Status: Completed
- Type: Office
- Location: 1999 Harrison Street; Oakland
- Coordinates: 37°48′28.02″N 122°15′54.08″W
- Opening: 1985
- Owner: Clarion Partners (since 2016)

Height
- Roof: 371 ft (113 m)

Technical details
- Floor count: 27
- Floor area: 490000 sq ft

Design and construction
- Architect: Bill Valentine
- Developer: Transpacific Development Co.

The Lake Merritt Plaza is a high-rise located in downtown Oakland, California, United States. It has 27 stories and stands at 371 ft (113 m) tall.

The building, developed by Transpacific Development Co., is designed by architect Bill Valentine. The building was completed in 1985.

In 2006, TDC sold it to Boston-based Beacon Capital Partners for $160 million. Divco West acquired the building in 2014. Clarion Partners bought the building from Divco West 2 years later, in 2016, for $211 million. A Bike Room opened on the groundfloor in 2023.

== See also ==
- List of tallest buildings in Oakland, California
- Lake Merritt
- Lake Merritt station
- Lake Merritt Breakfast Club
