= Rai Okamoto =

American architect

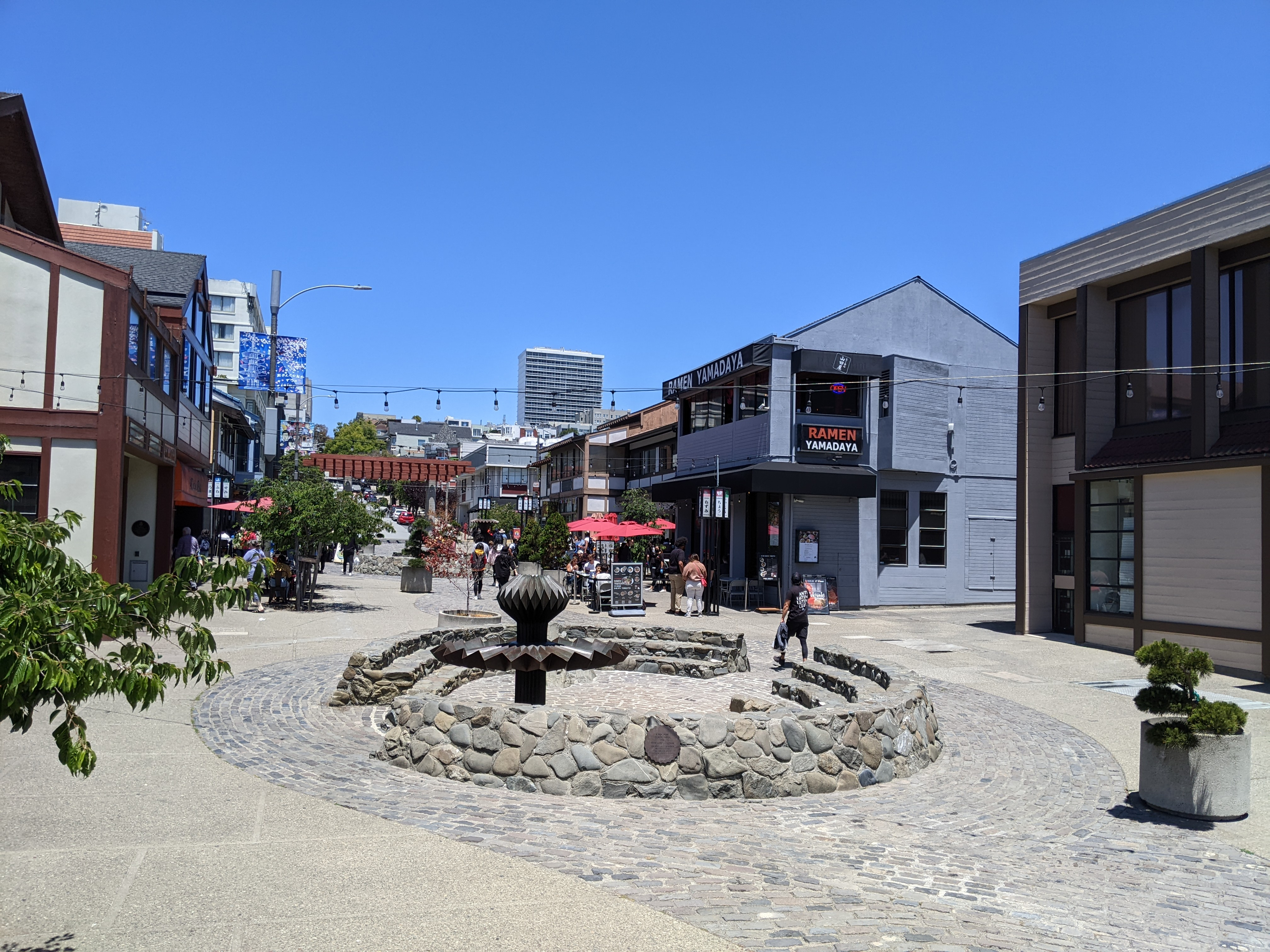
Buchanan Mall (also known as Osaka Way) in San Francisco's Japantown, designed by Okamoto

Rai Yukio Okamoto (July 21, 1927 in Philadelphia, Pennsylvania – July 7, 1993 in San Francisco, California) was an American architect and planner. He served as San Francisco's Director of Planning from 1975 to 1980.

Okamoto was born in Philadelphia, Pennsylvania. He got his B.Arch. from the University of Pennsylvania in 1950; an M.Arch. from the Massachusetts Institute of Technology in Cambridge, MA in 1951; and an M.City Planning from Yale University in New Haven, CT in 1954. He served as a Fulbright Scholar in France in 1954 and 1955.

He established the firm of Rai Y. Okamoto, Architect, in San Francisco, from 1960 to 1963. In 1963 he worked with the San Francisco Redevelopment Agency to develop a master plan for the second phase of the Japantown redevelopment. He served as Principal, President and Treasurer of the partnership Okamoto-Liskamm, Incorporated, Planners and Architects from 1964 to 1993. Okamoto-Liskamm was based in San Francisco, with branch offices in Seattle and New York. In 1966, Okamoto-Liskamm's master plan for the redevelopment of Oakland City Center received an award from Progressive Architecture. In 1969 he co-authored Urban Design Manhattan with Frank E. Williams for the Regional Plan Association. In the 1970s, he was hired by the San Francisco Redevelopment Agency to design Buchanan Mall in Japantown (as an extension of the Japan Center's Peace Plaza on the other side of Post Street), and was responsible for inviting sculptor Ruth Asawa to provide public art for the design. He served as Director of Planning for the City and County of San Francisco from 1975 to 1980, following Allan Jacobs and succeeded by Dean Macris.
