= 555 City Center =

Skyscraper in downtown Oakland, California

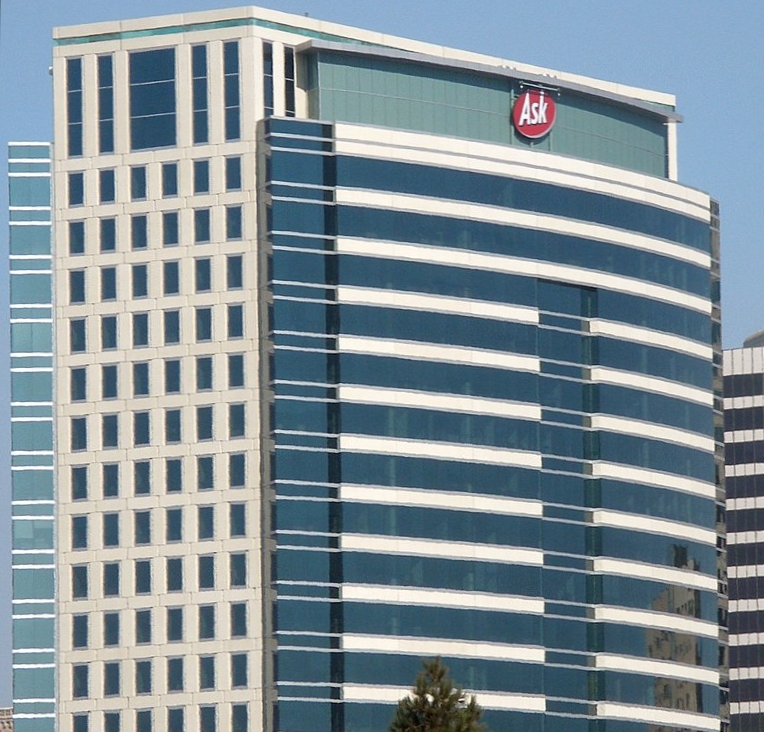

- Location within Oakland, California 555 City Center (California) 555 City Center (the United States)
- Alternative names: Oakland City Center

General information
- Type: Commercial offices
- Architectural style: Modernism
- Location: 555 12th Street; Oakland, California
- Coordinates: 37.8038°N 122.2752°W
- Construction started: 2000
- Completed: 2002
- Owner: Principal Real Estate Investors

Height
- Roof: 279 ft (85 m)

Technical details
- Floor count: 20
- Floor area: 500,000 sq ft (46,000 m^{2})

Design and construction
- Architecture firm: Korth Sunseri Hagey Architects
- Structural engineer: Nishkian Menninger
- Other designers: The Gazzardo Partnership (landscaping)
- Main contractor: Pankow Builders

555 City Center is a 20-story, 279 ft (85 m) skyscraper in the City Center complex of downtown Oakland, California. The building was completed in 2002, and designed by Korth Sunseri Hagey Architects of San Francisco for Shorenstein Properties.

== Tenants ==
- Matson Navigation Company
- Ask.com (global HQ)

== See also ==
- List of tallest buildings in Oakland, California
