= Clorox Building =

24-story High-rise building in the City Center complex of downtown Oakland, California

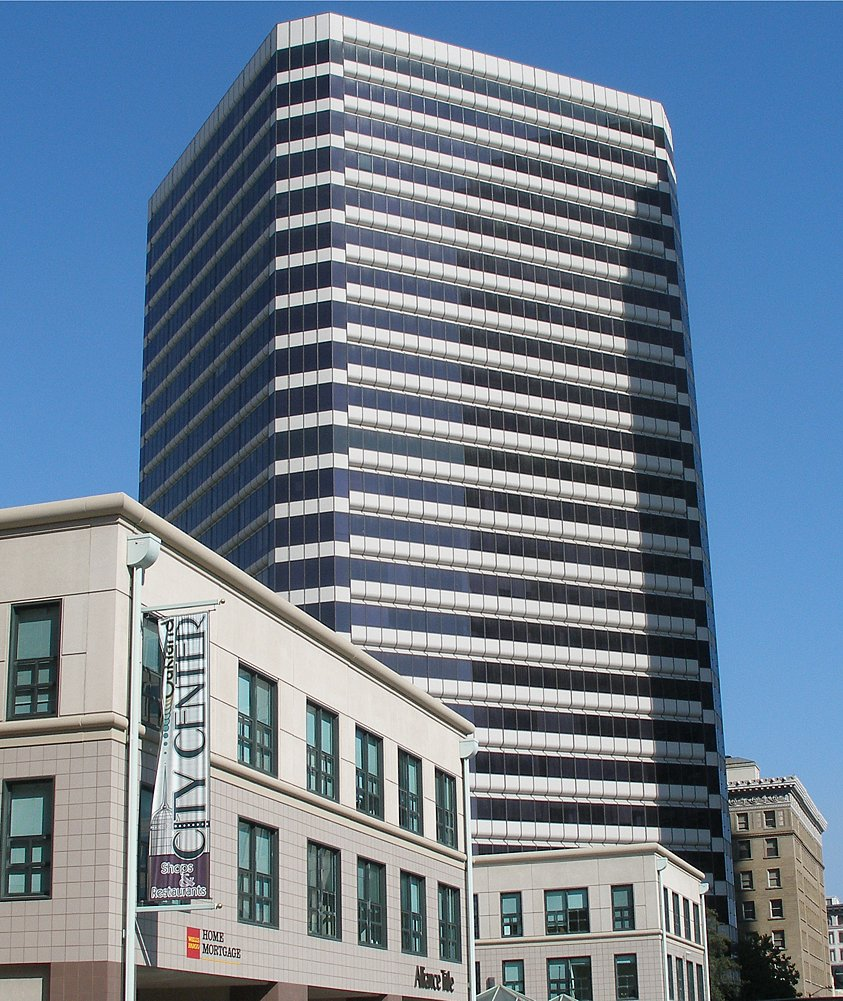

- Location within Oakland, California Clorox Building (California) Clorox Building (the United States)

General information
- Type: Commercial offices
- Architectural style: Modernism
- Location: 1221 Broadway; Oakland, California
- Coordinates: 37.8034°N 122.2724°W
- Completed: 1976

Height
- Roof: 330 ft (100 m)

Technical details
- Floor count: 24

Design and construction
- Architect: Cesar Pelli
- Architecture firm: Gruen Associates
- Main contractor: Turner Construction

The Clorox Building is a 24-story, 330 ft (100 m) high-rise building in the City Center complex of downtown Oakland, California. The building was completed in 1976, and designed by Cesar Pelli when he worked with Gruen Associates now based in Los Angeles. The Oakland-based Clorox Company is headquartered in the building.

== See also ==
- List of tallest buildings in Oakland, California
