= Bill Valentine (architect) =

American architect (1937–2026)

William Valentine
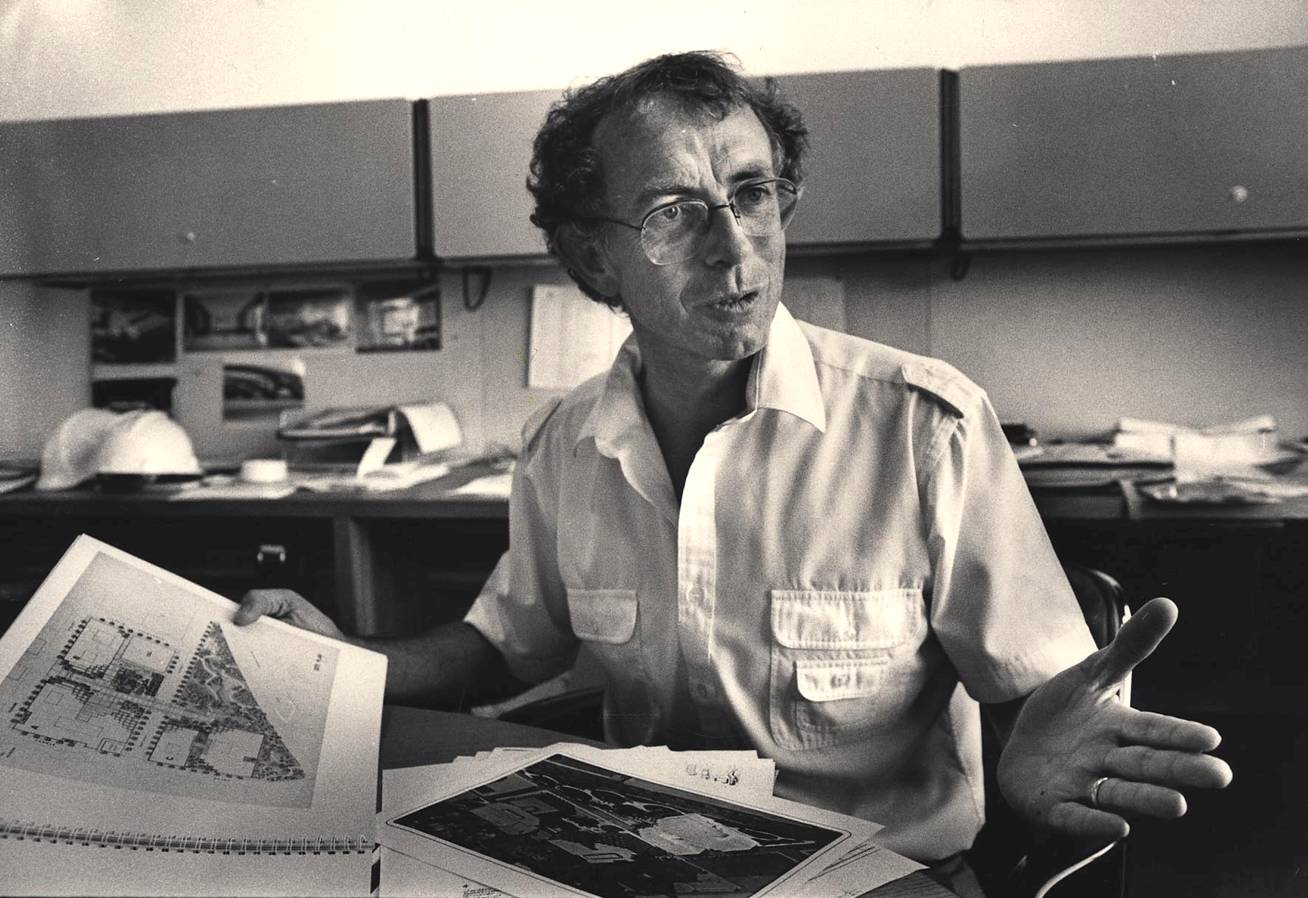
- Valentine in 1980
- Born: September 13, 1937; Winston-Salem, North Carolina, U.S.
- Died: June 25, 2026 (aged 88); Mill Valley, California, U.S.
- Education: Harvard University
- Occupation: Architect
- Years active: 1962-2012
- Employer: HOK

William Valentine FAIA (September 13, 1937 – June 25, 2026) was an American architect. He worked at the firm HOK from 1962 to 2012, leading large projects such as the King Khalid International Airport and the Moscone Center.

== Life and career ==
Valentine received a Bachelor of Architecture degree from North Carolina State University and a Master of Architecture degree from Harvard University. He was a lecturer in Architecture at the Harvard Graduate School of Design.

He started his career at HOK in St. Louis in 1962. In 1970, he moved to California to help open HOK's San Francisco office. In 2000, he was named president and design principal of HOK, and in 2005 he assumed the role of chairman. Valentine retired from HOK in 2012, after 50 years with the firm. Up until his death in 2026 he remained HOK chairman emeritus and lived in Mill Valley, California.

In 2008, the AIA made him an official media contact on all things regarding design.

In July 2019, Valentine and his wife, Jane, donated $250,000 to help fund construction of the new Whiteville High School, their alma mater, in Whiteville, North Carolina.

Valentine died June 25, 2026, at the age of 88.

== Style ==
As a Fellow of the American Institute of Architects and a Leadership in Energy and Environmental Design (LEED) credentialed professional, Valentine was a frequent speaker and author on sustainable design. He was a leader for sustainability within the architectural profession.

Valentine described his definition of good design as “a simple idea, elegantly executed and inspiring, with social significance and in harmony with the environment.” He was a strong advocate for simplicity and efficiency and the "power of using less" as essential concepts of sustainable architecture, and attributed his philosophy—that "all designs should be very simple….we should work to solve our clients' needs and to be helpful to the world"—to the influence of HOK co-founder Gyo Obata.

Valentine was a self-proclaimed "evangelist" for affordable net zero carbon emissions design. In 2009–2010, he led an HOK team that collaborated with The Weidt Group to create a market-rate, zero-emissions prototype design for a Class A commercial office building in St. Louis, Missouri.

== Selected projects ==
- Wellmark Blue Cross Blue Shield Association Headquarters, 2010 (Des Moines, Iowa), LEED Platinum certification
- Net Zero Court Zero Emissions Office Building Prototype, 2010 (St. Louis, Missouri)
- Biogen Idec Research and Development Campus, 2005 (San Diego, California)
- Nortel Carling R&D Campus, 2001 (Ottawa, Ontario, Canada)
- Phoenix Municipal Courthouse, 1999 (Phoenix, Arizona)
- Microsoft Campus, 1998 (Redmond, Washington)
- Adobe Systems Headquarters, 1996 (San Jose, California)
- Apple Inc. R&D Campus, 1993 (Cupertino, California)
- Lake Merritt Plaza, 1085 (Oakland, California)
- King Khalid International Airport, 1983 (Riyadh, Saudi Arabia)
- Levi Strauss & Co. Levi's Plaza, 1982 (San Francisco, California)
- Moscone Center, 1981 (San Francisco, California)

== Awards ==
- 2007: Legend Award delivered by Contract magazine at the Annual Interiors Awards.
- Corporate Real Estate Executive of the Year by CoreNet Global's Northern California Chapter.
- Outstanding Business Executive award by the American Public Transportation Association.
