= Elihu M. Harris State Office Building =

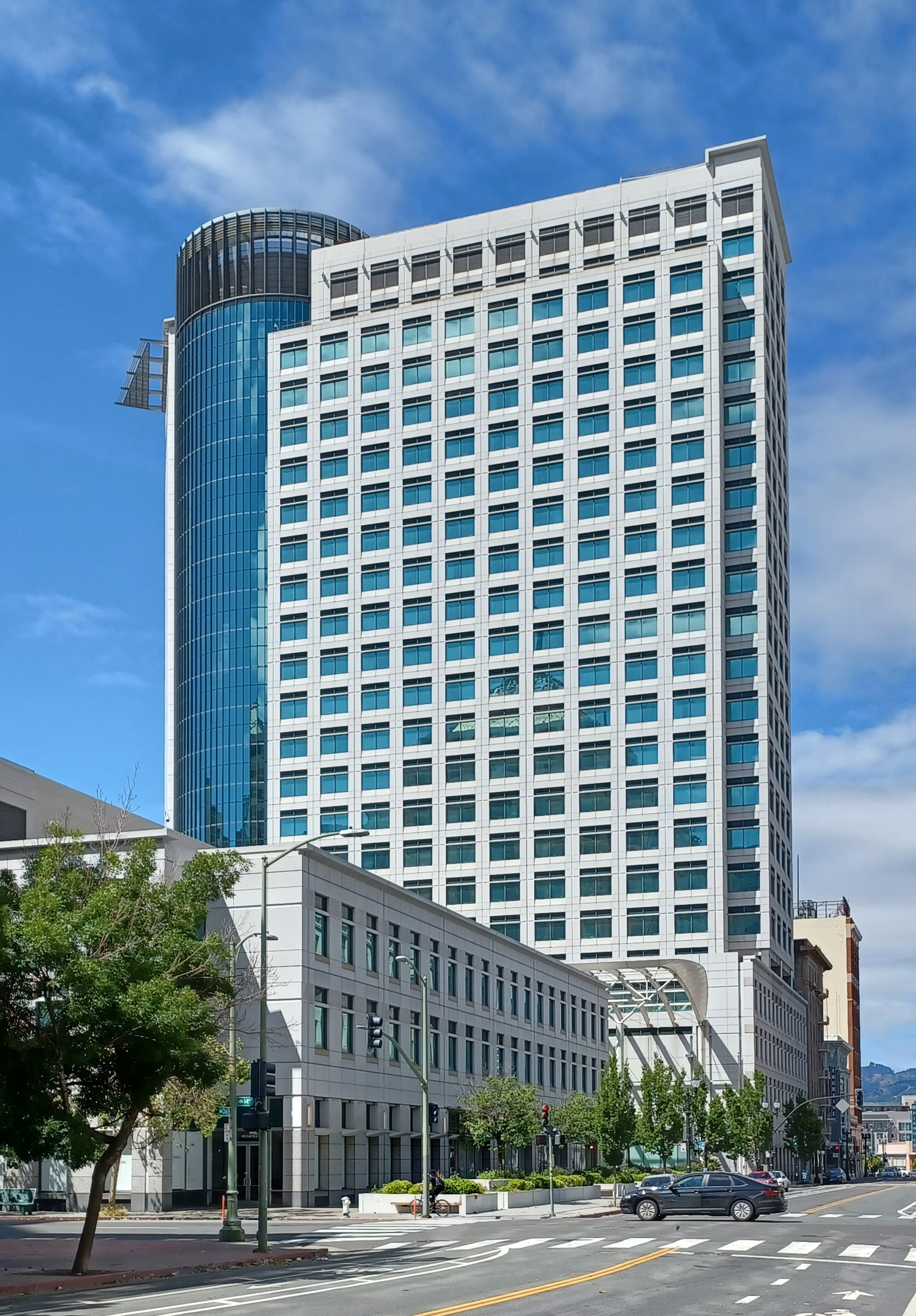

- Location within Oakland, California Elihu M. Harris State Office Building (California) Elihu M. Harris State Office Building (the United States)

General information
- Status: Completed
- Type: Office
- Location: 1501–1533 Clay Street; Oakland
- Coordinates: 37°48′23.37″N 122°16′25.29″W
- Opening: 1998

Height
- Roof: 328 ft (100 m)

Technical details
- Floor count: 23

The Elihu M. Harris State Office Building is a high-rise located in downtown Oakland, California. It has 23 floors and stands at 328 feet (100 m) tall. The building is named for Elihu Harris, a former mayor of Oakland who is still living.

== Offices ==
Offices for agencies located in the building include (but are not limited to) the California Department of General Services, the California Department of Tax and Fee Administration, the California Public Employment Relations Board and the California Department of Rehabilitation.

== See also ==
- List of tallest buildings in Oakland, California
