= Bank of America Building (Oakland) =

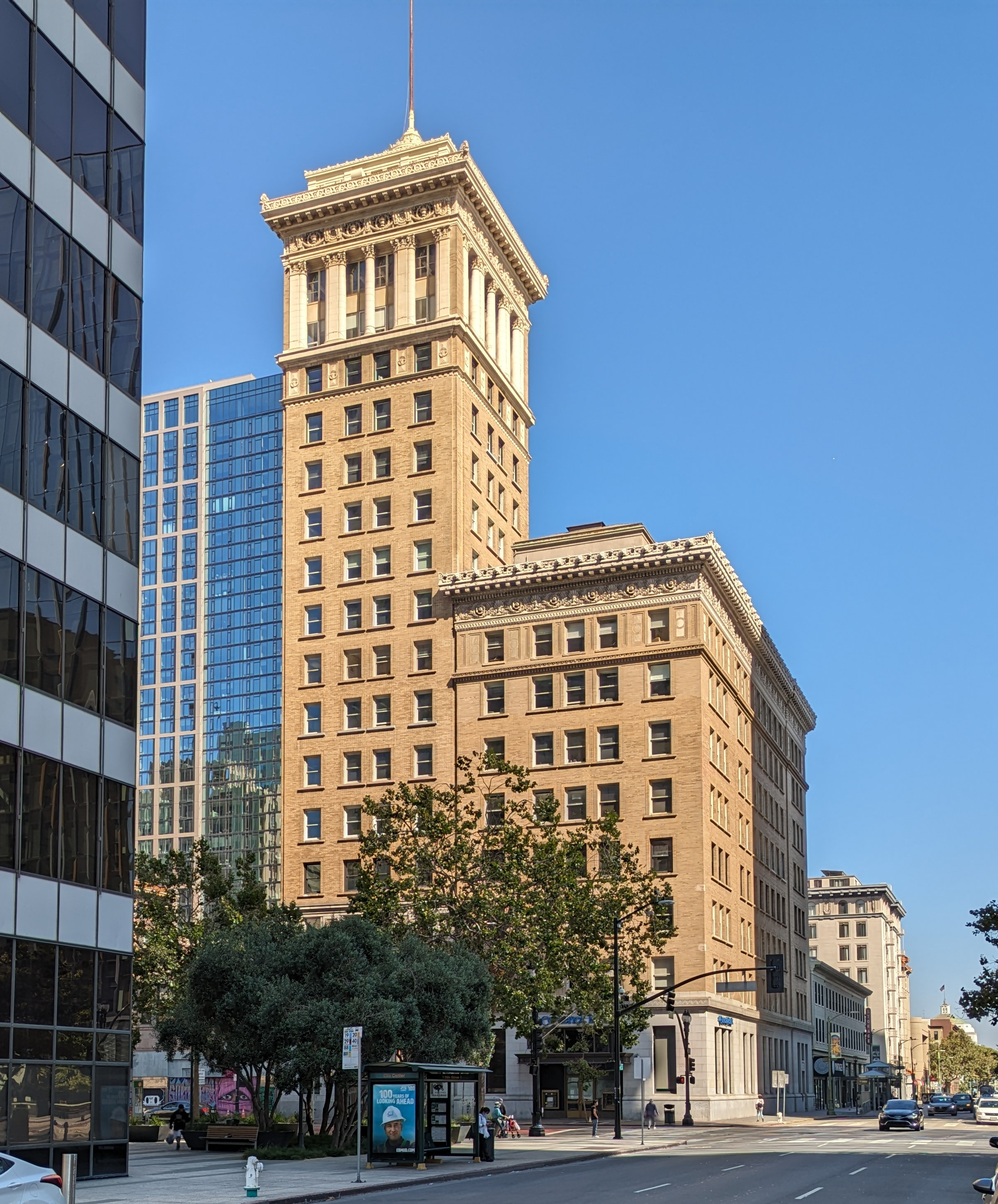
- Bank of America Building

- Location within Oakland, California Bank of America Bldg. (California) Bank of America Bldg. (the United States)
- Alternative names: Oakland Bank Building; Oakland Bank of Savings

General information
- Type: Commercial offices
- Location: 1200-1212 Broadway; Oakland, California
- Coordinates: 37.8031°N 122.2717°W
- Completed: 1907

Height
- Roof: 225 ft (69 m)

Technical details
- Floor count: 18

The Bank of America Building, also called Oakland Bank Building and Oakland Bank of Savings, is a 225 ft (69 m) high-rise located in downtown Oakland, California. The building was originally constructed with nine floors, and the 18-story tower was annexed later. It was built as a headquarters for the Oakland Bank, which was acquired by Bank of America in 1929.

== See also ==
- List of tallest buildings in Oakland, California
