= Ordway Building =

Skyscraper in Oakland, California

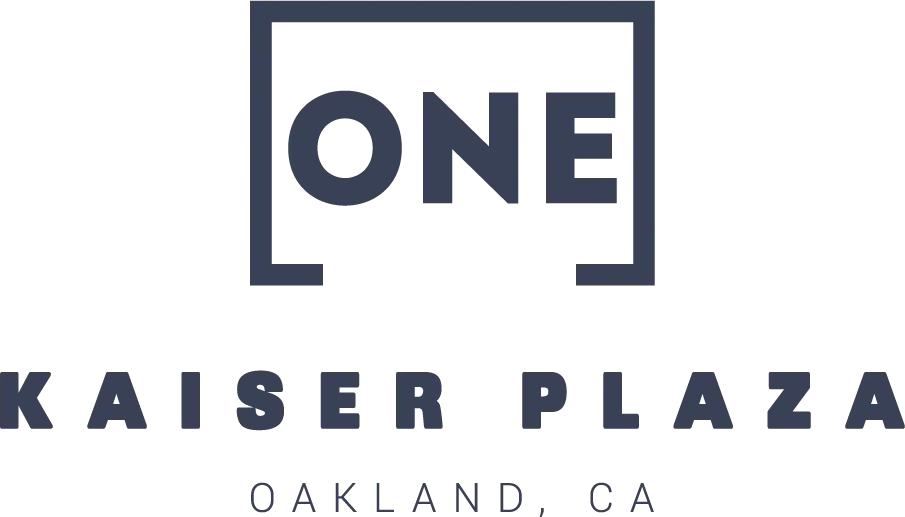

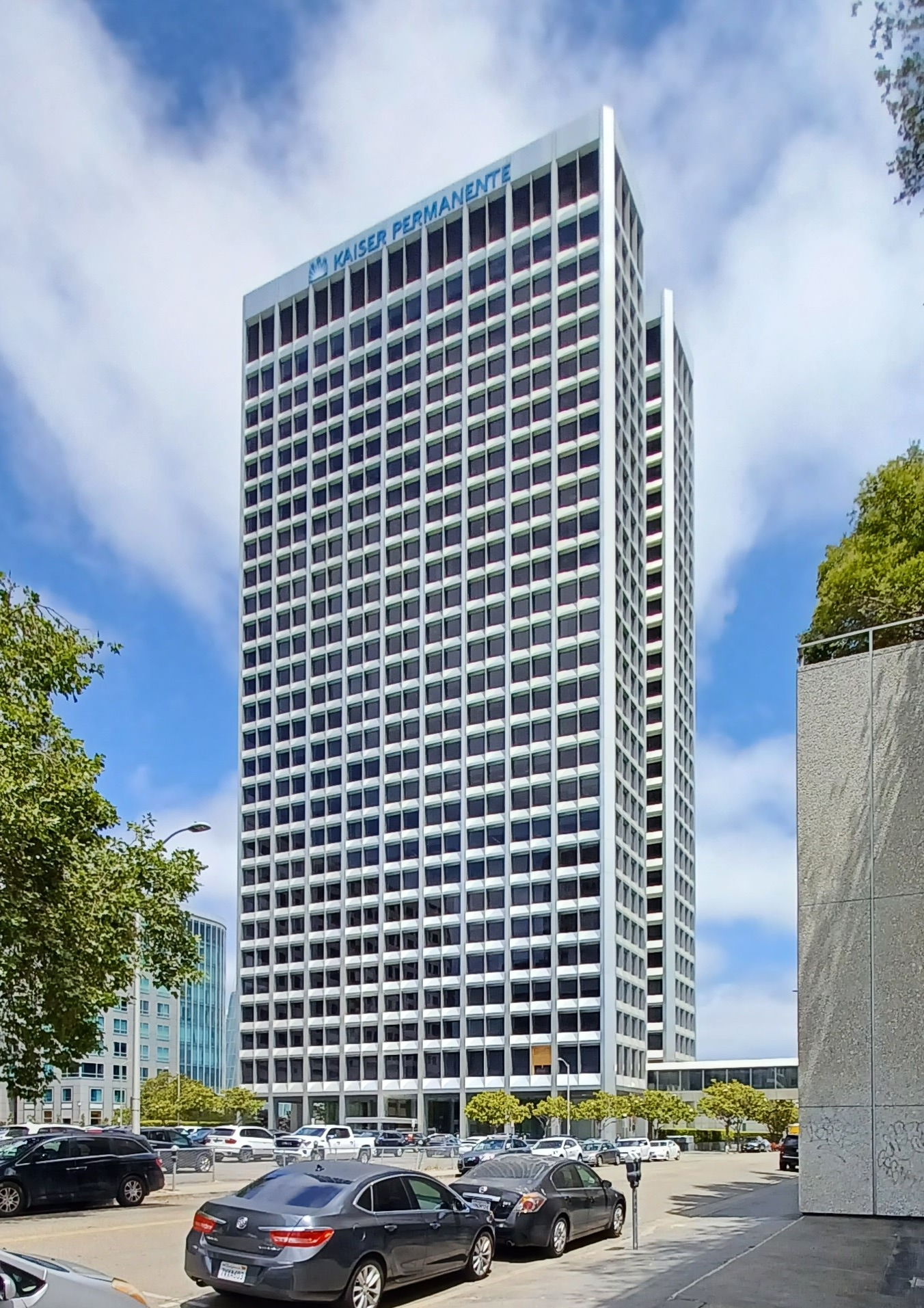
- The Ordway Building in 2023

- Location within Oakland, California Location within California Location within the United States
- Alternative names: One Kaiser Plaza

General information
- Type: Commercial offices
- Location: 1 Kaiser Plaza Oakland CA 94612
- Coordinates: 37.8099°N 122.2640°W
- Completed: 1970
- Owner: CIM Group

Height
- Roof: 404 ft (123 m)

Technical details
- Floor count: 28
- Floor area: 530,865 sq ft (49,319.0 m^{2})

Design and construction
- Architect: Skidmore, Owings & Merrill
- Main contractor: Turner Construction

Website
- onekaiserplaza.com

The Ordway Building (also known as One Kaiser Plaza) is a skyscraper located in downtown Oakland, California. The building lies close to Oakland's Lake Merritt and the tower contains 28 stories of office space. There are eight corner offices per floor, since the skyscraper has an H-shaped floor plan. Standing 404 ft (123 m), the tower is the tallest skyscraper in the city and the entire Bay Area outside of San Francisco.

The Ordway Building's main tenant is Kaiser Permanente, which has used the building as its national headquarters since completion in 1970. As of 2009, Kaiser was leasing space on 21 floors. Kaiser announced on August 6, 2009 that it had signed a new nine-year lease with landlord CIM Group.

== See also ==
- List of tallest buildings in Oakland, California
