= Oakland City Center =

Commercial development in Oakland, California, US

Coordinates: 37.8041°N 122.2726°W

Oakland City Center is an office, shopping and hotel complex in Downtown Oakland, Oakland, California. The complex is the product of a redevelopment project begun in the late 1950s. It covers twelve city blocks between Broadway on the east, Martin Luther King Jr. Way on the west, Frank H. Ogawa Plaza on 14th Street on the north side of the complex and the Oakland Convention Center and Marriott Hotel extend south to 10th Street. An hourly parking garage is located beneath the complex's shopping mall. The mall features an upscale fitness and racquet club, in addition to numerous take-out restaurants and other stores. The complex is served by the 12th Street/Oakland City Center BART station.

== History ==
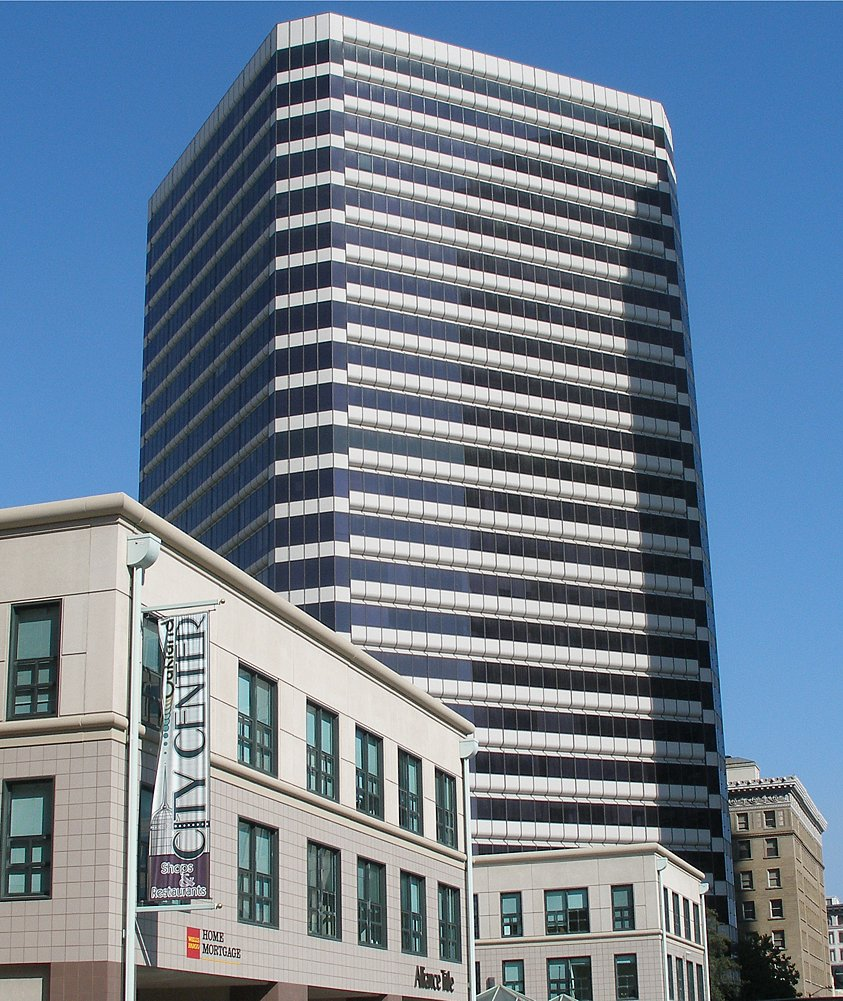
The Clorox Building, viewed from 12th Street

A large section of ornate Victorian and Italianate style apartment buildings, with ground-floor retail shops in the center of Downtown Oakland, was appropriated by the city through the force of eminent domain and demolished to make way for what was originally proposed to be an enclosed shopping mall, high-rise office buildings, a hotel, and an aboveground parking structure. In the draft Central District Plan, the Oakland Redevelopment Agency originally had an ambitious goal of razing 70 city blocks, but neighborhood residents and the Downtown Property Owner's Association objected, and the plan was scaled back to only 12 blocks between 10th and 14th Streets on the west side of Broadway. The redevelopment plan, by William Liskamm and Rai Okamoto, won a 1966 Design Award from Progressive Architecture. As reported in the Oakland Tribune, residents were evicted from several residential hotels for purported code enforcement reasons under an aggressive plan called "Operation Padlock." Several pawnshops and Oakland's Moulin Rouge Theatre were leveled. According to Richard A. Walker, professor of geography at the University of California, Berkeley, the delicatessen, Ratto's, which had been in business since around the turn of the century, was threatened by demolition before citizen protest saved it.

The first office building, at 14th and Broadway, opened on December 18, 1973. The first skyscraper, the Clorox Building, opened next door in 1976. However, construction stalled, and by the 1980s the mall still hadn't been built and most of the site was still vacant. The project was redesigned, with a smaller outdoor retail complex and new federal office building replacing the mall, and a partial restoration of the original street grid. Several new buildings were completed in 1990, including the retail complex, named City Square, and 1111 Broadway, the new headquarters of the global shipping company American President Lines (APL). Economic recovery of downtown Oakland was stalled by the 1989 Loma Prieta earthquake and a recession in the early 1990s, and private development at City Center stopped for the next few years. Government payrolls were not affected; the Ronald V. Dellums Federal Building complex was completed in 1994, bringing more pedestrian traffic to the struggling mall.

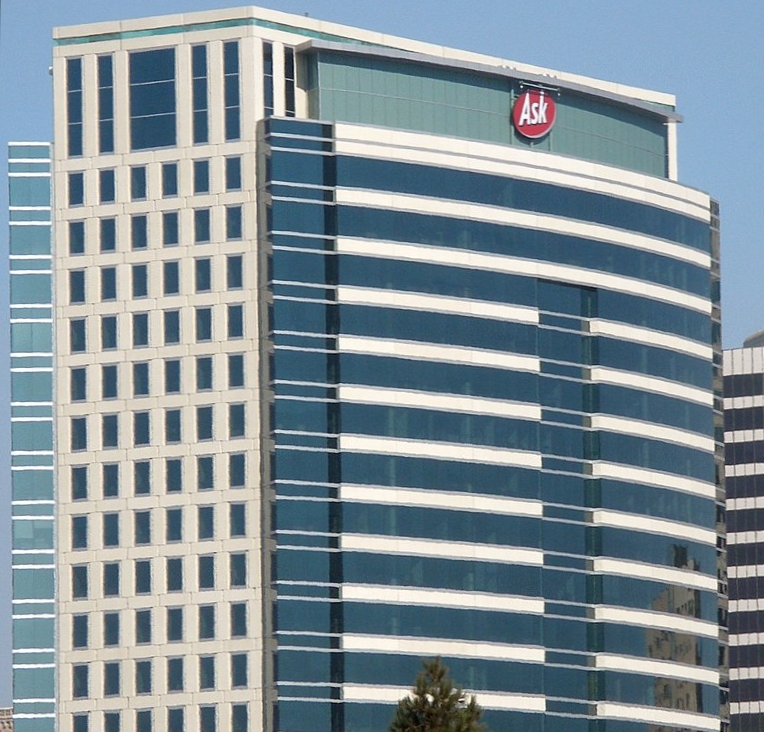
555 City Center.

In December 1996, Oakland City Center, including the development rights to the remaining undeveloped parcels, was sold to Shorenstein Properties. The company planned to build four high-rise office buildings on the remaining four lots. Only one was built, 555 City Center, which was completed in 2002. Shorenstein Properties sold the development rights for one of the lots back to the city, which in turn sold it to the Olson Company, which is building market-rate condominiums. Shorenstein Properties is now planning to build market-rate condominiums on one of the two remaining vacant parcels, and an office tower on the other. The latter was approved for construction in late 2007; on October 1, 2008, a groundbreaking gathering occurred for the tower.

In June 2010, the majority of the City Center was sold to CB Richard Ellis Investors for $360 million.

== See also ==
- Jack London Square
- Lakeside Apartments District
- List of tallest buildings in Oakland, California
