= Kaiser Center =

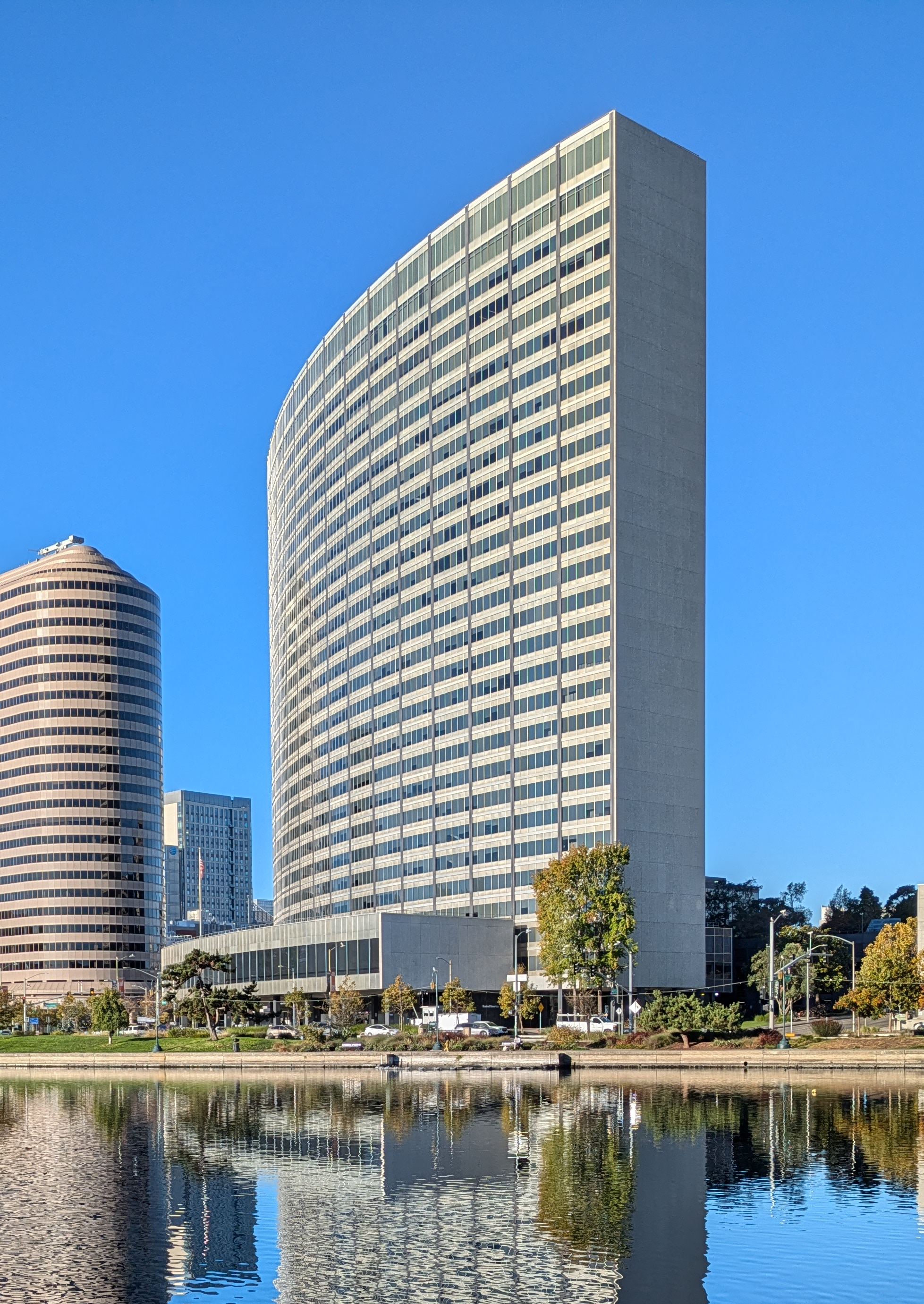

- Location within Oakland, California Location within California Location within the United States
- Alternative names: Kaiser Building

General information
- Type: Commercial offices
- Location: 300 Lakeside Drive; Oakland, California
- Coordinates: 37.8088°N 122.2644°W
- Completed: 1960
- Owner: The Swig Company

Height
- Roof: 389 ft (119 m)

Technical details
- Floor count: 28
- Floor area: 976,000 sq ft (90,700 m^{2})

Design and construction
- Architect: Welton Becket
- Main contractor: Robert E. McKee Contractor, Inc.

Kaiser Center, also called the Kaiser Building, is a 28-story office building located at 300 Lakeside Drive, adjacent to Lake Merritt, in downtown Oakland, California, designed by the architectural firm of Welton Becket & Associates of Los Angeles. The property is bounded by Lakeside Drive, which terminates and joins Harrison Street at the site, 20th-, 21st-, and Webster-streets. When completed in 1960, it was Oakland's tallest building, as well as the largest office tower west of the Rocky Mountains. A three-story office/retail building adjacent to the main tower was completed in 1963.

Kaiser Center was the headquarters of Kaiser Industries, a Fortune 500 conglomerate that was headed by industrialist Edgar F. Kaiser at the time the building was constructed.

== Architecture ==
The main exterior of the building consists of glass and metal, primarily aluminum. There is also stone cladding around much of the building made up of concrete and a stone aggregate. This material is very likely an "exceptionally pure" coarse-grained dolomite. It probably originated in the quarries in California owned by Kaiser.

The building's roof garden was designed by San Francisco-based landscape architecture firm, Theodore Osmundson & Associates, and was the first built in the United States after World War II. While legend has it that Henry J. Kaiser resided in a penthouse apartment on the 28th floor, by 1960 the elder Kaiser had turned over the Oakland-based company to his son, and pursued projects based in Honolulu. It is much more likely that his son Edgar, who was in charge of Kaiser industries and a major power broker in the Bay Area by the time the building was commissioned, was the person who occupied any residential apartments. According to a National Park Service study, Edgar commissioned the architecturally significant rooftop garden after the building had been designed, inspired by the gardens of Rockefeller Center in N.Y.

== Tenants ==
The building was home to the headquarters of the Bay Area Rapid Transit District from 2003 to 2021. Other tenants include the University of California Office of the President, Kaiser Foundation Health Plan, The Port Company, and California Bank & Trust. Global technical services company AECOM moved into the building in 2016.

== Acquisition by PG&E ==
In the summer of 2020, San Francisco-based utility Pacific Gas and Electric Company (PG&E) announced it would place for sale its downtown San Francisco headquarters complex, which has become increasingly expensive to operate, and relocate its headquarters to Kaiser Center, which it intends to purchase. PG&E employees from suburban office locations in Concord and San Ramon will also be consolidated at Kaiser Center (referred to by PG&E as "300 Lakeside"). A deal to sell the San Francisco complex was reached in the spring of 2021, subject to approval from the California Public Utilities Commission. The headquarters move is expected to be finished by 2026. PG&E was in Chapter 11 bankruptcy for most of 2019 and part of 2020 in response to its liability for the catastrophic 2017 and 2018 wildfires in Northern California.

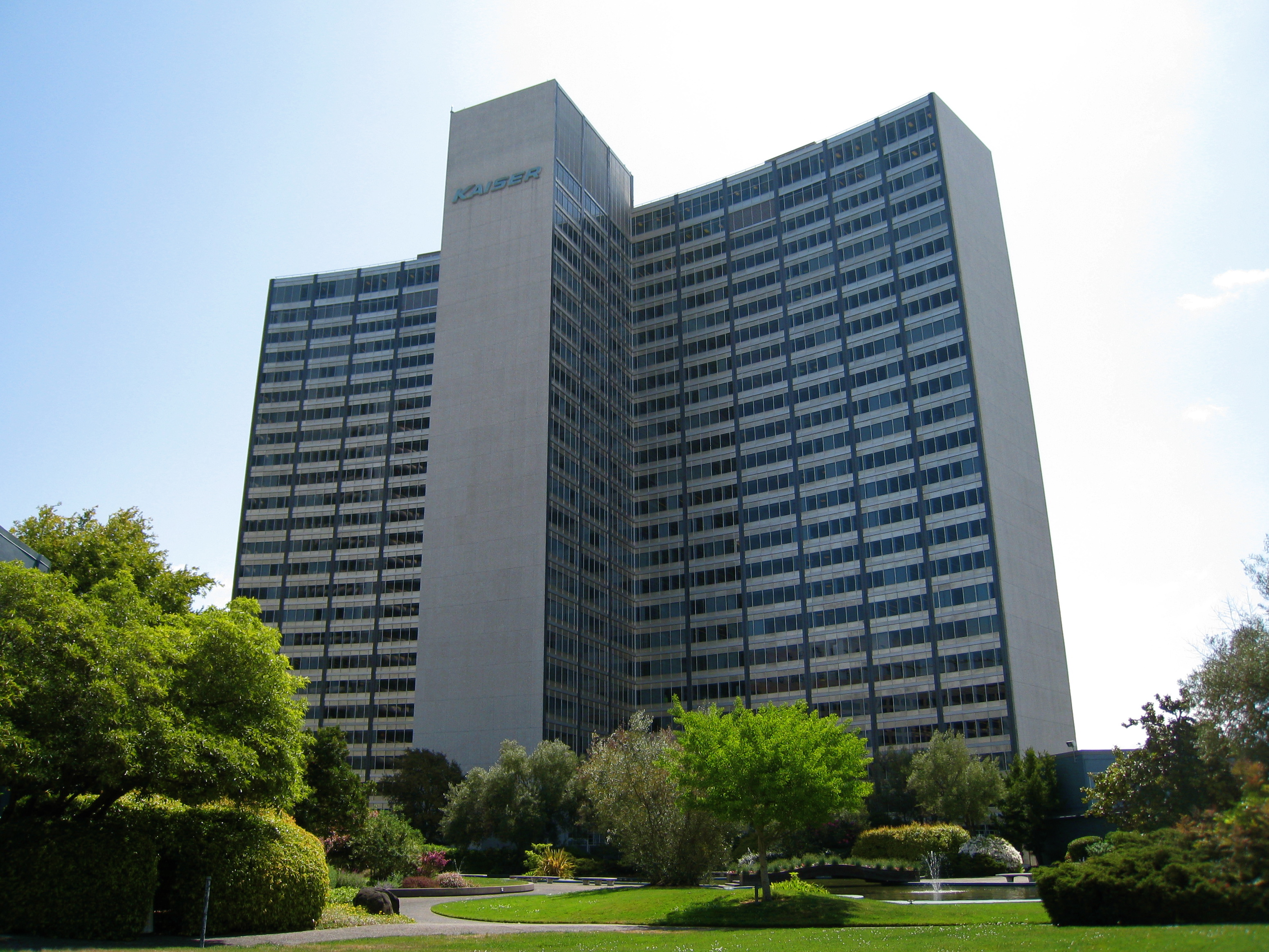
