= Kaiser Engineering Building =

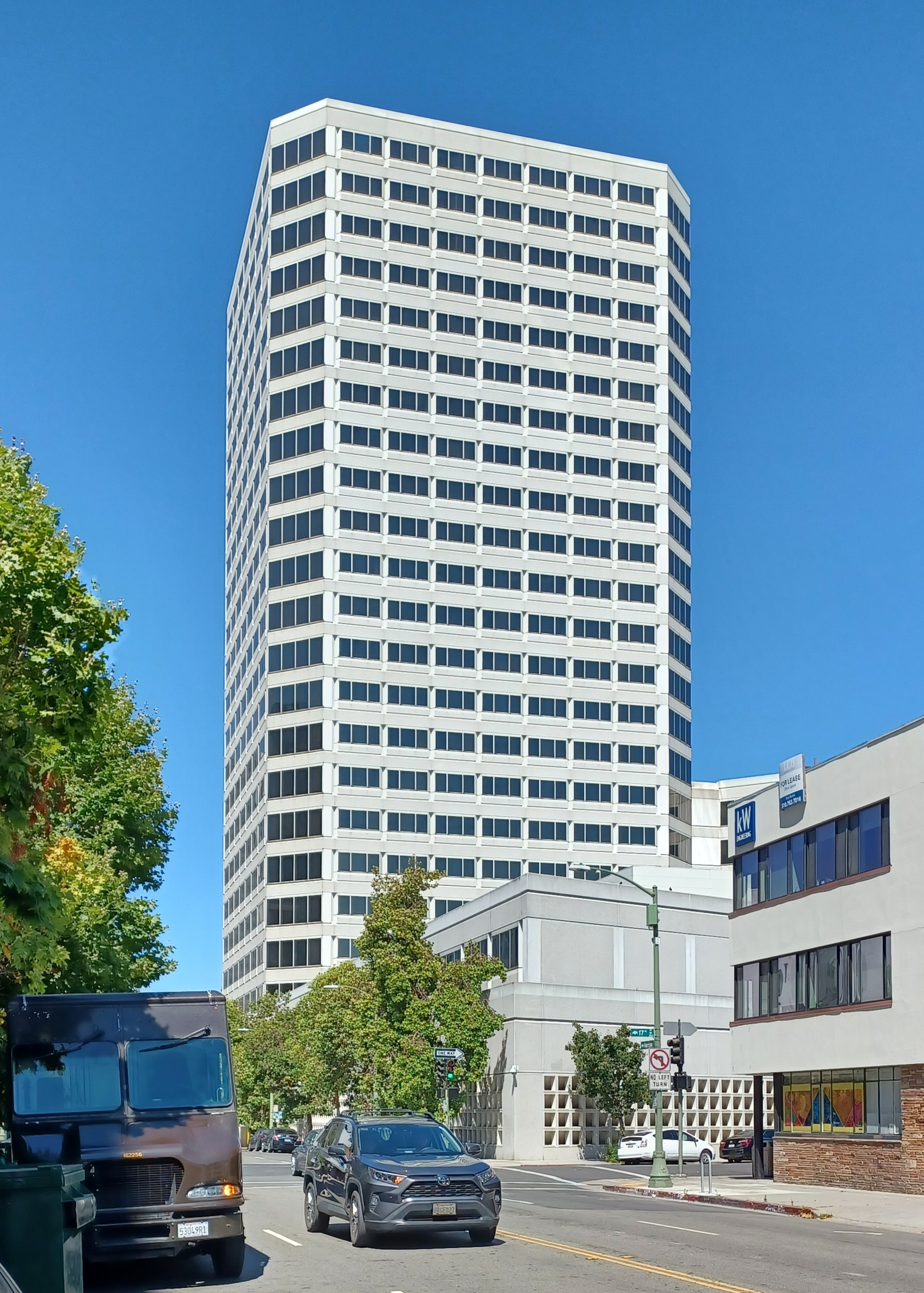
- Interactive map of the Kaiser Engineering Building area

General information
- Status: Completed
- Type: Office
- Location: 1800 Harrison Street; Oakland
- Coordinates: 37°48′21.55″N 122°15′54.93″W
- Opening: 1984

Height
- Roof: 336 ft (102 m)

Technical details
- Floor count: 25

Design and construction
- Architect: Skidmore, Owings and Merrill
- Main contractor: Clark Construction

The Kaiser Engineering Building, also called the Raymond Kaiser Engineering Building, is a high-rise located in downtown Oakland, California. It has 25 stories and stands 336 ft (102 m) tall.

== See also ==
- List of tallest buildings in Oakland, California
