= René C. Davidson Courthouse =

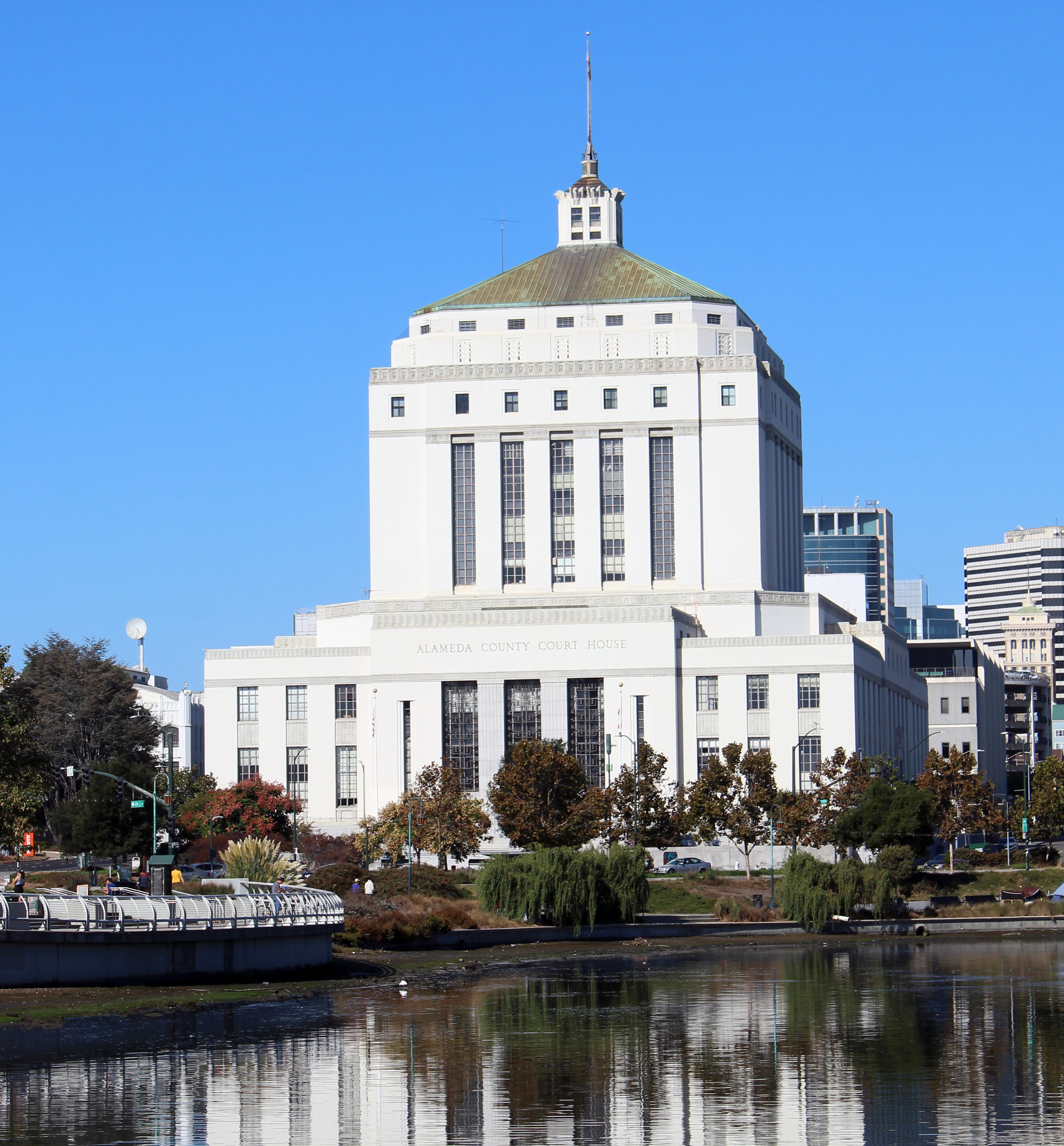
- René C. Davidson Courthouse, overlooking Lake Merritt

- Location within Oakland, California Location within California Location within the United States

General information
- Type: Government
- Location: 1225 Fallon Street; Oakland, California, US
- Coordinates: 37°47′59.7″N 122°15′46.76″W
- Completed: 1934

Technical details
- Floor count: 12

Design and construction
- Architects: Henry A. Minton, William Corlett, James Plachek, William Schirmer, Carl Werner

The René C. Davidson Courthouse (also known as the, Alameda County Court House) is the main courthouse, part of the Alameda County Superior Court system. The art deco style courthouse was completed in 1934 and is located in the county seat of Oakland, California, US. It is adjacent to Lake Merritt.

== History ==
The building was built in 1934 on the edge of Lake Merritt, originally housing the entirety of the Alameda County Superior Court system. The old courthouse that it replaced was demolished in 1949. The inscription on the building reads "Alameda County Court House."

In the early 1930s Alameda County District Attorney Earl Warren sought a modern structure to the replace the antiquated 1893 Alameda County Court House at 4th Street and Broadway. The building served as the office of the Clerk-County Recorder from 1934 to the 2000 when replaced by a new building at 1106 Madison Street in Oakland. The name of Rene C. Davidson was placed on the Alameda County Court House after the death of the longtime Recorder.
