= Encinal, Sutter County, California =

Unincorporated community in California, United States

Encinal, California
- Unincorporated community
- Location within California Location within the United States
- Coordinates: 39°12′56″N 121°39′42″W
- Country: United States
- State: California
- County: Sutter
- Elevation: 69 ft (21 m)
- Time zone: UTC-8 (Pacific (PST))
  - Summer (DST): UTC-7 (PDT)
- Area codes: 916, 279
- GNIS feature ID: 1658503

Encinal (Spanish for "Oak Grove") is an unincorporated community in Sutter County, California, United States. The Sacramento Northern Railway traveled through the community in the 1900s.

== Geography ==
Encinal is located to the west of California State Route 99, 5 miles (8.0 km) north of Yuba City.
